= Řepeč =

- Municipality
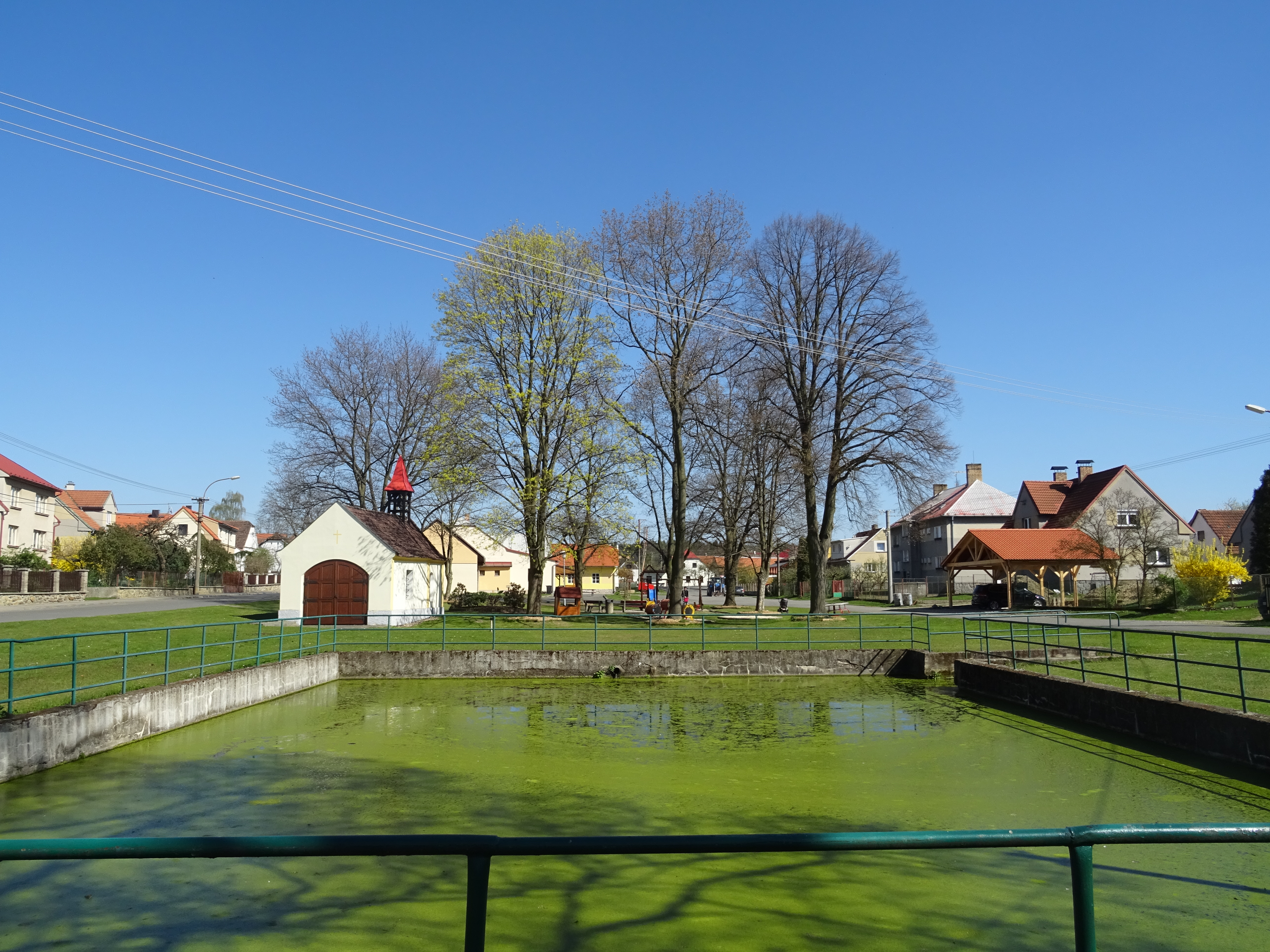
- Centre of Řepeč

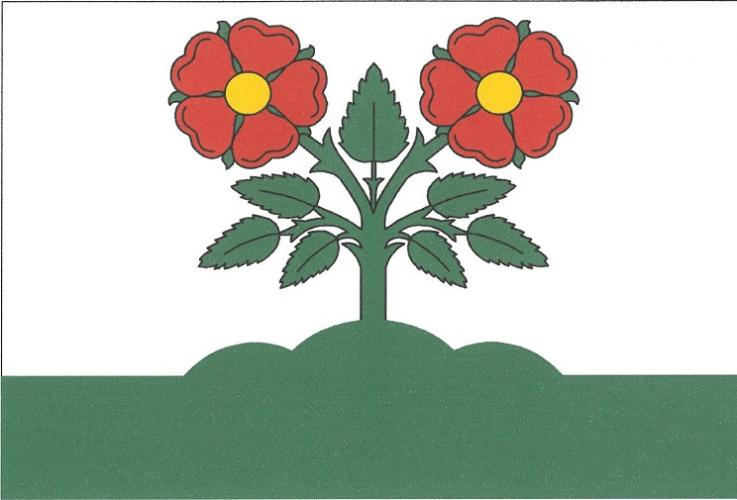
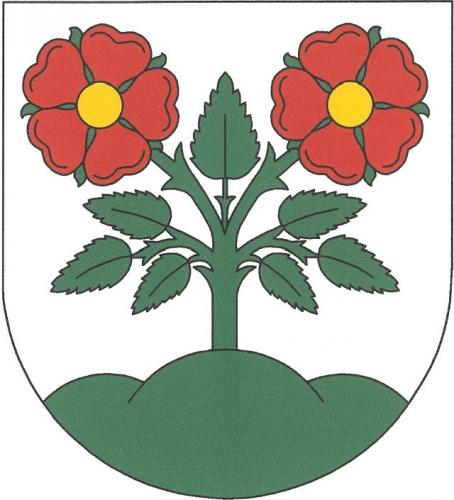
- Flag Coat of arms

- Location in the Czech Republic
- Coordinates: 49°24′13″N 14°31′11″E
- Country: Czech Republic
- Region: South Bohemian
- District: Tábor
- First mentioned: 1283

Area
  - Total: 12.79 km^{2} (4.94 sq mi)
- Elevation: 475 m (1,558 ft)

Population (2026-01-01)
  - Total: 282
  - Density: 22.0/km^{2} (57.1/sq mi)
- Time zone: UTC+1 (CET)
  - Summer (DST): UTC+2 (CEST)
- Postal code: 391 61
- Website: www.repec.cz

Řepeč is a municipality and village in Tábor District in the South Bohemian Region of the Czech Republic. It has about 300 inhabitants.

Řepeč lies approximately 11 kilometres (7 mi) west of Tábor, 48 km (30 mi) north of České Budějovice, and 77 km (48 mi) south of Prague.

== Administrative division ==
Řepeč consists of two municipal parts (in brackets population according to the 2021 census):

- Řepeč (259)
- Kášovice (16)

== Demographics ==
Historical population
Year	Pop.	±%
1869	516	—
1880	540	+4.7%
1890	484	−10.4%
1900	490	+1.2%
1910	466	−4.9%
1921	494	+6.0%
1930	426	−13.8%
1950	339	−20.4%
1961	324	−4.4%
1970	311	−4.0%
1980	281	−9.6%
1991	239	−14.9%
2001	261	+9.2%
2011	243	−6.9%
2021	275	+13.2%
Source: Censuses
