= Černýšovice =

- Municipality
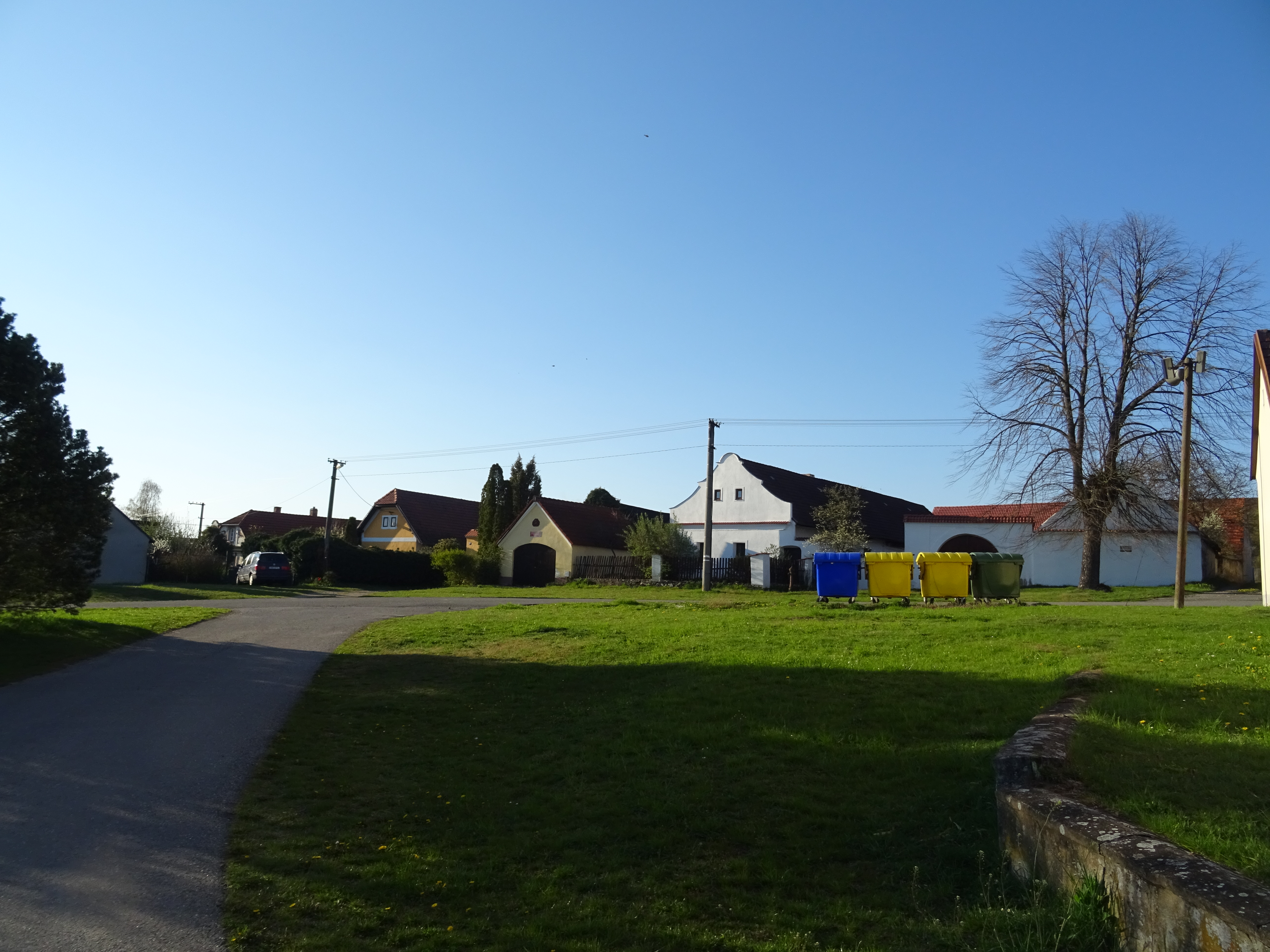
- Centre of Černýšovice

- Location in the Czech Republic
- Coordinates: 49°19′31″N 14°31′14″E
- Country: Czech Republic
- Region: South Bohemian
- District: Tábor
- First mentioned: 1390

Area
  - Total: 10.14 km^{2} (3.92 sq mi)
- Elevation: 431 m (1,414 ft)

Population (2026-01-01)
  - Total: 81
  - Density: 8.0/km^{2} (21/sq mi)
- Time zone: UTC+1 (CET)
  - Summer (DST): UTC+2 (CEST)
- Postal code: 391 65
- Website: www.obeccernysovice.cz

Černýšovice is a municipality and village in Tábor District in the South Bohemian Region of the Czech Republic. It has about 80 inhabitants.

Černýšovice lies approximately 15 kilometres (9 mi) south-west of Tábor, 39 km (24 mi) north of České Budějovice, and 85 km (53 mi) south of Prague.

== Administrative division ==
Černýšovice consists of two municipal parts (in brackets population according to the 2021 census):

- Černýšovice (44)
- Hutě (42)

== Demographics ==
Historical population
Year	Pop.	±%
1869	639	—
1880	592	−7.4%
1890	577	−2.5%
1900	531	−8.0%
1910	503	−5.3%
1921	459	−8.7%
1930	442	−3.7%
1950	287	−35.1%
1961	236	−17.8%
1970	181	−23.3%
1980	129	−28.7%
1991	93	−27.9%
2001	86	−7.5%
2011	81	−5.8%
2021	86	+6.2%
Source: Censuses
