= Drhovice =

- Municipality
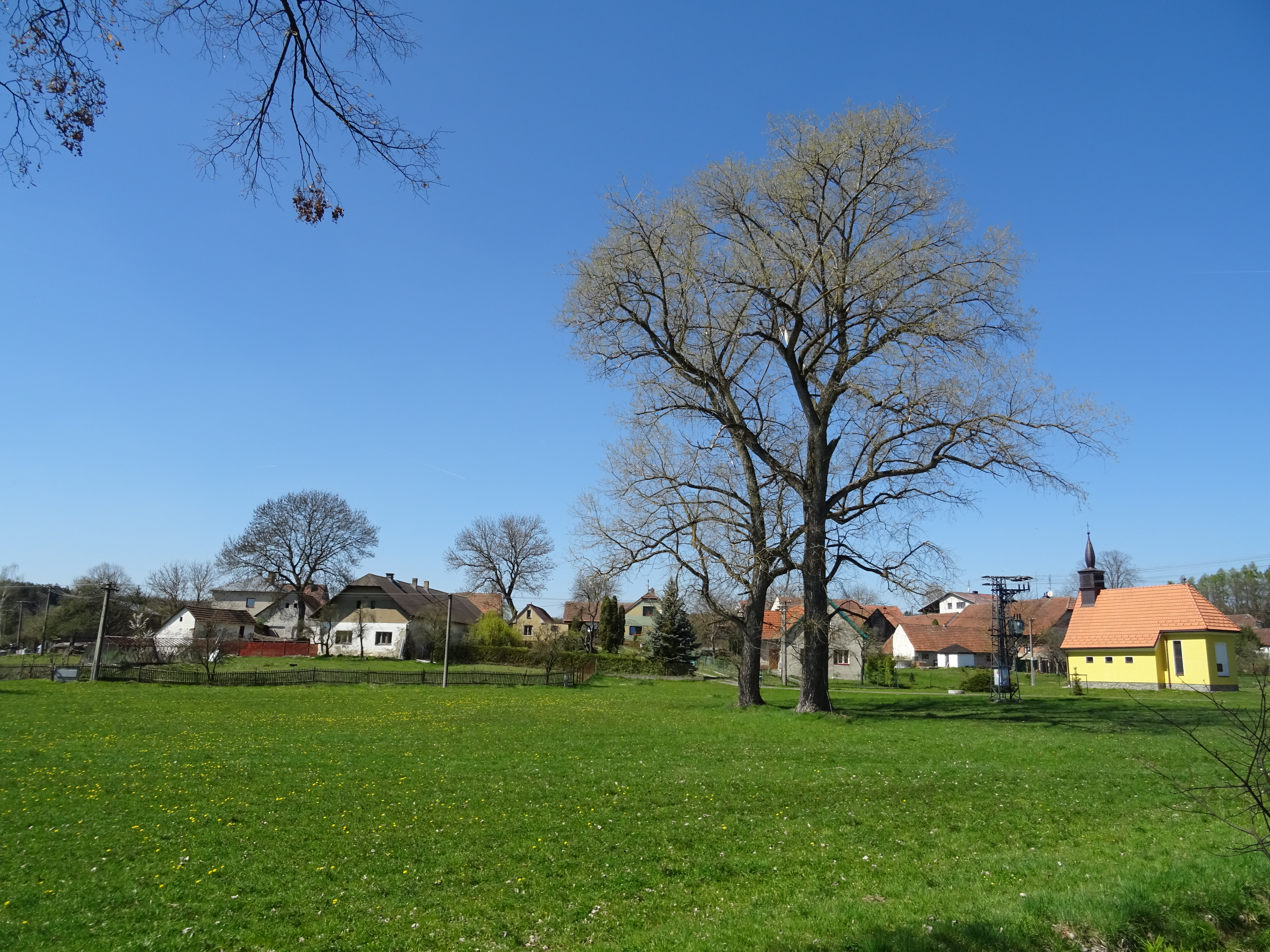
- Centre of Drhovice

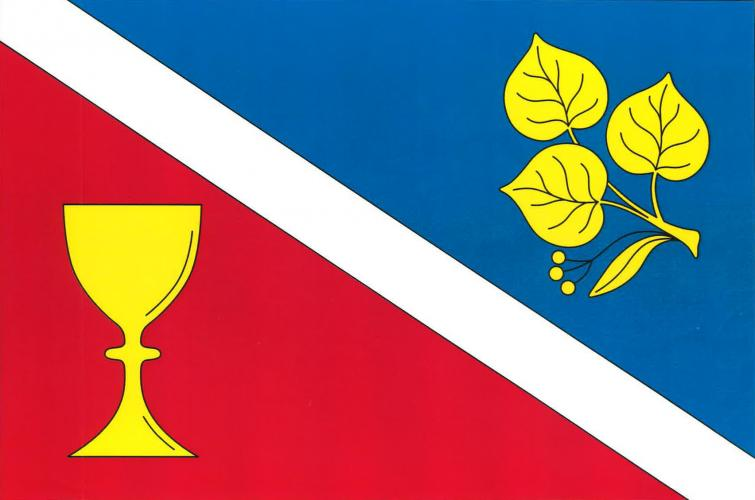
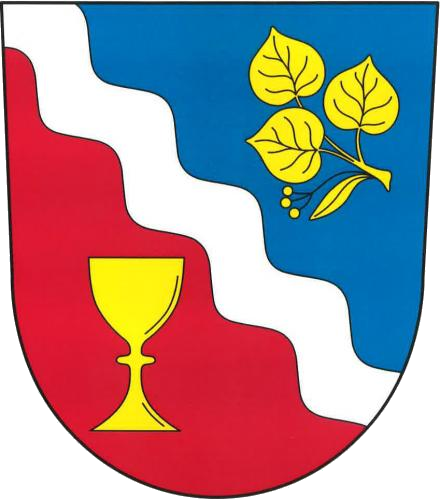
- Flag Coat of arms

- Location in the Czech Republic
- Coordinates: 49°25′58″N 14°33′30″E
- Country: Czech Republic
- Region: South Bohemian
- District: Tábor
- First mentioned: 1219

Area
  - Total: 4.26 km^{2} (1.64 sq mi)
- Elevation: 476 m (1,562 ft)

Population (2026-01-01)
  - Total: 227
  - Density: 53.3/km^{2} (138/sq mi)
- Time zone: UTC+1 (CET)
  - Summer (DST): UTC+2 (CEST)
- Postal code: 391 31
- Website: www.obecdrhovice.cz

Drhovice is a municipality and village in Tábor District in the South Bohemian Region of the Czech Republic. It has about 200 inhabitants.

Drhovice lies approximately 9 kilometres (6 mi) west of Tábor, 52 km (32 mi) north of České Budějovice, and 73 km (45 mi) south of Prague.

== Demographics ==
Historical population
Year	Pop.	±%
1869	322	—
1880	344	+6.8%
1890	323	−6.1%
1900	275	−14.9%
1910	282	+2.5%
1921	259	−8.2%
1930	238	−8.1%
1950	197	−17.2%
1961	272	+38.1%
1970	280	+2.9%
1980	194	−30.7%
1991	173	−10.8%
2001	190	+9.8%
2011	201	+5.8%
2021	219	+9.0%
Source: Censuses
