= Ústrašice =

- Municipality
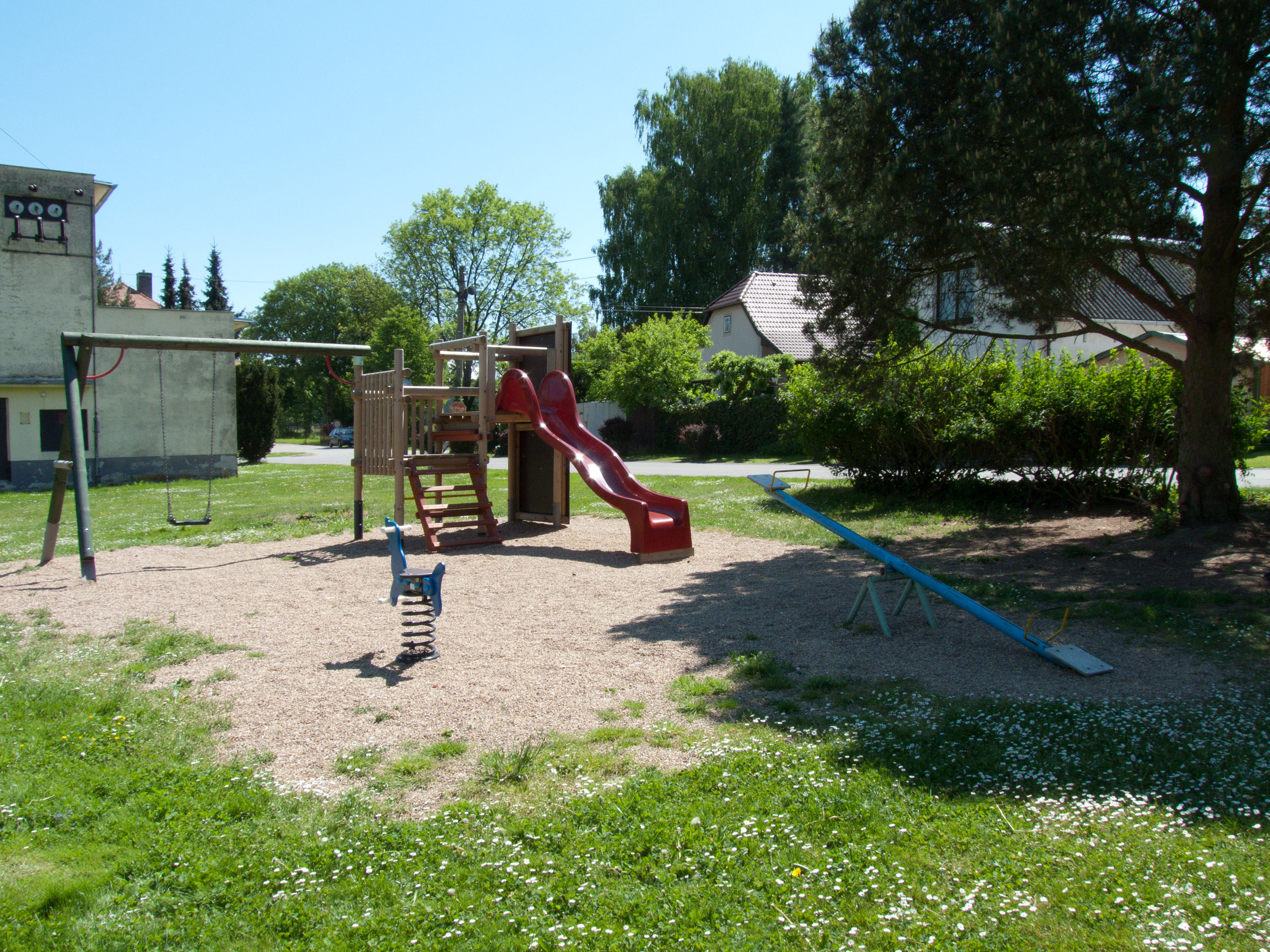
- Playground

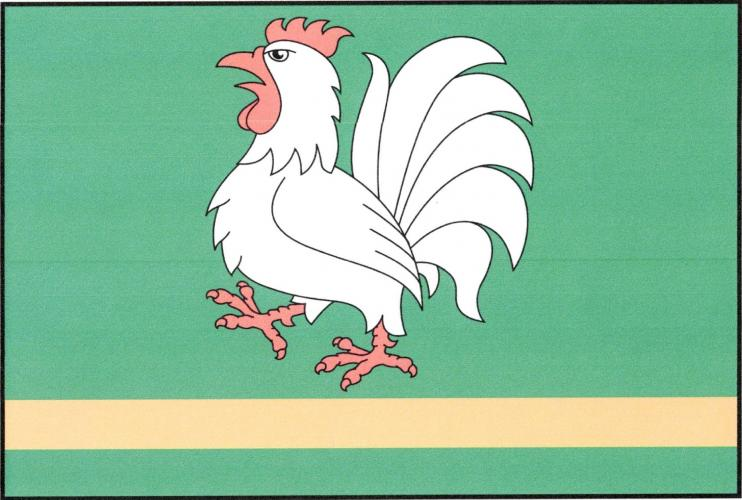
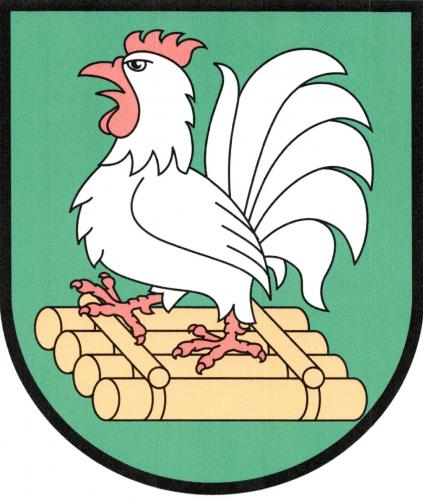
- Flag Coat of arms

- Location in the Czech Republic
- Coordinates: 49°20′25″N 14°41′4″E
- Country: Czech Republic
- Region: South Bohemian
- District: Tábor
- First mentioned: 1405

Area
  - Total: 7.40 km^{2} (2.86 sq mi)
- Elevation: 405 m (1,329 ft)

Population (2026-01-01)
  - Total: 406
  - Density: 54.9/km^{2} (142/sq mi)
- Time zone: UTC+1 (CET)
  - Summer (DST): UTC+2 (CEST)
- Postal code: 390 02
- Website: www.ustrasice.cz

Ústrašice is a municipality and village in Tábor District in the South Bohemian Region of the Czech Republic. It has about 400 inhabitants.

Ústrašice lies approximately 9 kilometres (6 mi) south of Tábor, 44 km (27 mi) north of České Budějovice, and 86 km (53 mi) south of Prague.

== History ==
The first written mention of Ústrašice is from 1405.

== Demographics ==
Historical population
| Year | Pop. | ±% |
|---|---|---|
| 1869 | 297 | — |
| 1880 | 292 | −1.7% |
| 1890 | 297 | +1.7% |
| 1900 | 303 | +2.0% |
| 1910 | 269 | −11.2% |
| 1921 | 253 | −5.9% |
| 1930 | 246 | −2.8% |
| 1950 | 196 | −20.3% |
| 1961 | 228 | +16.3% |
| 1970 | 241 | +5.7% |
| 1980 | 207 | −14.1% |
| 1991 | 206 | −0.5% |
| 2001 | 199 | −3.4% |
| 2011 | 333 | +67.3% |
| 2021 | 386 | +15.9% |
Source: Censuses
