= Chrbonín =

- Municipality
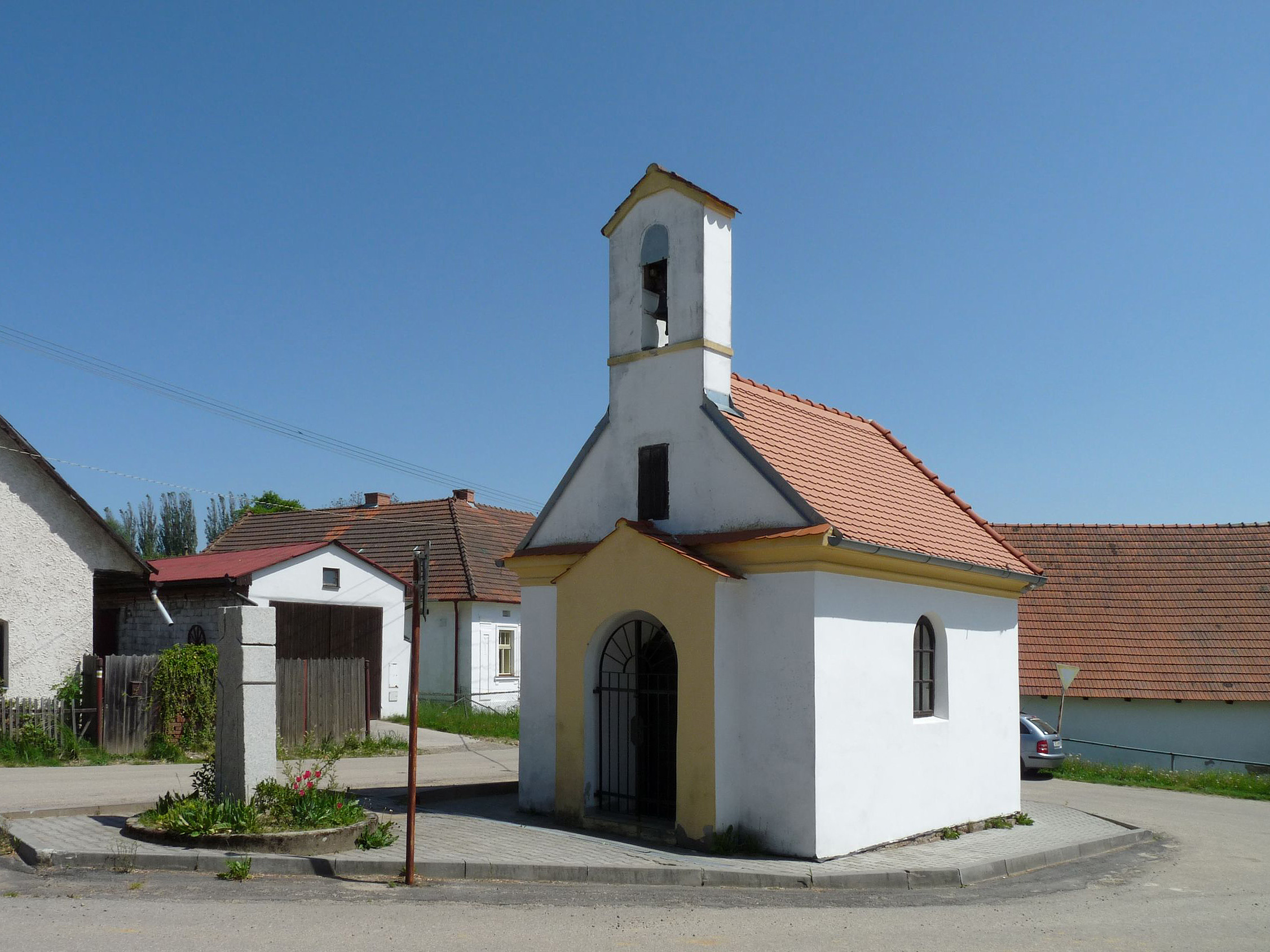
- Chapel of the Assumption of the Virgin Mary

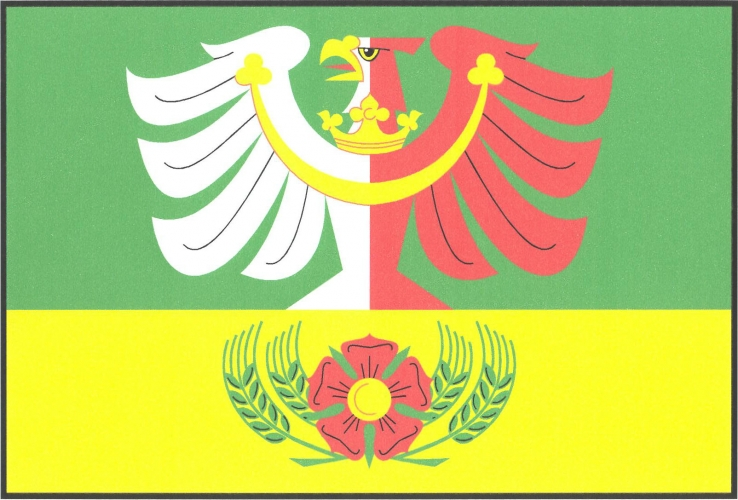
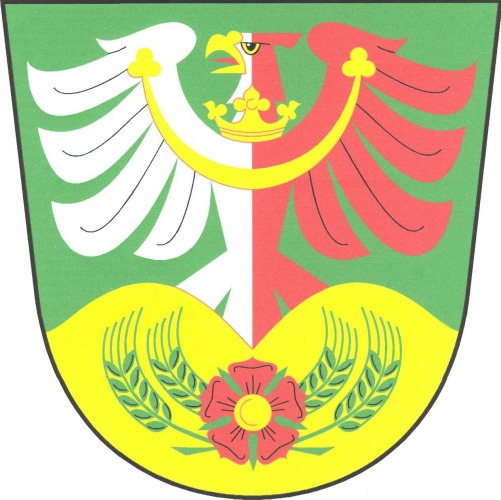
- Flag Coat of arms

- Location in the Czech Republic
- Coordinates: 49°21′31″N 14°51′52″E
- Country: Czech Republic
- Region: South Bohemian
- District: Tábor
- First mentioned: 1379

Area
  - Total: 7.09 km^{2} (2.74 sq mi)
- Elevation: 588 m (1,929 ft)

Population (2026-01-01)
  - Total: 165
  - Density: 23.3/km^{2} (60.3/sq mi)
- Time zone: UTC+1 (CET)
  - Summer (DST): UTC+2 (CEST)
- Postal code: 391 55
- Website: obec-chrbonin.cz

Chrbonín is a municipality and village in Tábor District in the South Bohemian Region of the Czech Republic. It has about 200 inhabitants.

Chrbonín lies approximately 17 kilometres (11 mi) east of Tábor, 52 km (32 mi) north-east of České Budějovice, and 87 km (54 mi) south of Prague.

== Demographics ==
Historical population
Year	Pop.	±%
1869	364	—
1880	310	−14.8%
1890	291	−6.1%
1900	277	−4.8%
1910	266	−4.0%
1921	285	+7.1%
1930	269	−5.6%
1950	188	−30.1%
1961	190	+1.1%
1970	182	−4.2%
1980	170	−6.6%
1991	151	−11.2%
2001	141	−6.6%
2011	142	+0.7%
2021	158	+11.3%
Source: Censuses
