= Turovec =

- Municipality
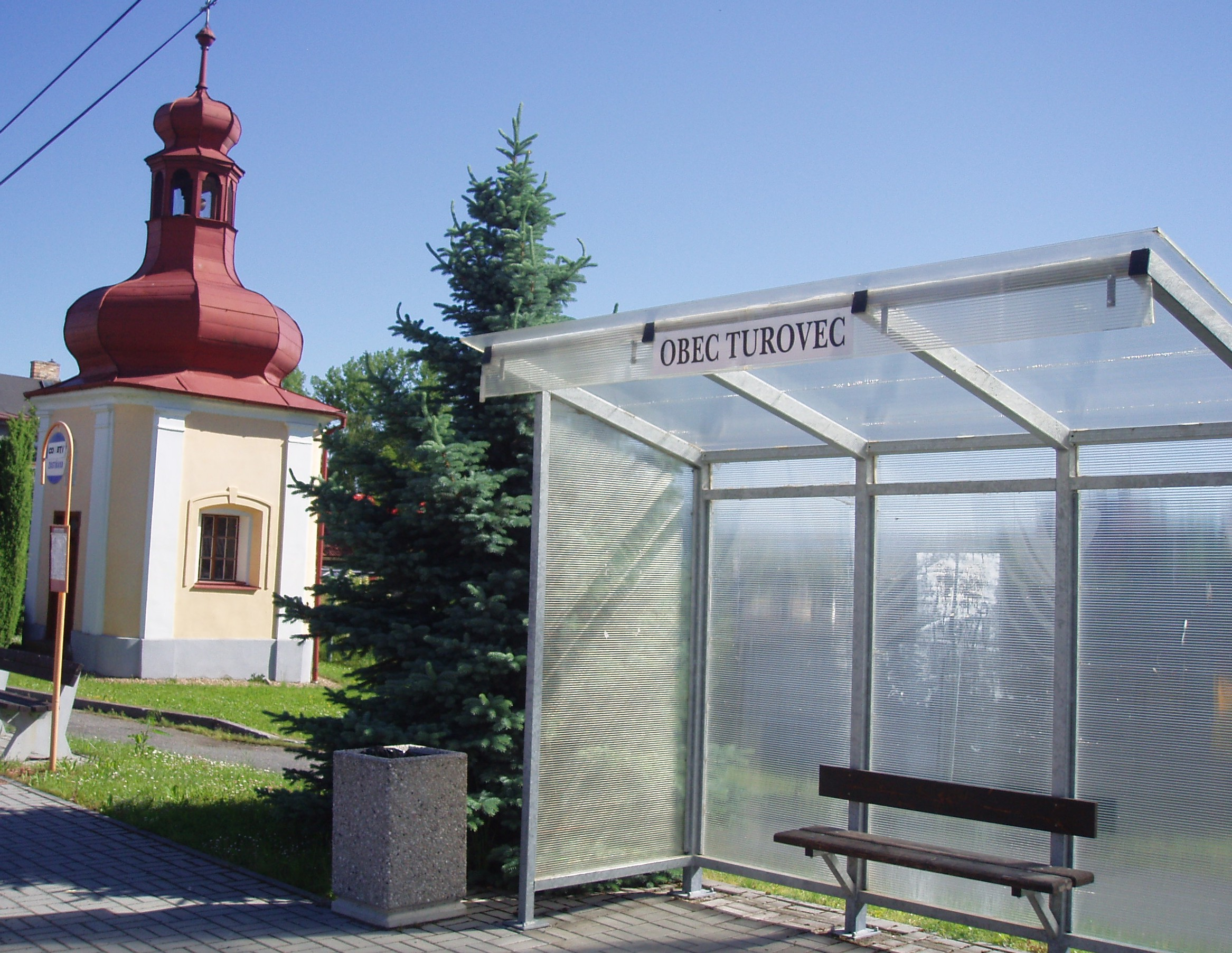
- Bus stop and Chapel of Saint John of Nepomuk

- Flag Coat of arms

- Location in the Czech Republic
- Coordinates: 49°22′42″N 14°46′8″E
- Country: Czech Republic
- Region: South Bohemian
- District: Tábor
- First mentioned: 1318

Area
  - Total: 13.25 km^{2} (5.12 sq mi)
- Elevation: 418 m (1,371 ft)

Population (2026-01-01)
  - Total: 281
  - Density: 21.2/km^{2} (54.9/sq mi)
- Time zone: UTC+1 (CET)
  - Summer (DST): UTC+2 (CEST)
- Postal code: 391 21
- Website: www.obecturovec.cz

Turovec is a municipality and village in Tábor District in the South Bohemian Region of the Czech Republic. It has about 300 inhabitants.

Turovec lies approximately 7 kilometres (4 mi) south-east of Tábor, 51 km (32 mi) north-east of České Budějovice, and 81 km (50 mi) south of Prague.

== Demographics ==
Historical population
Year	Pop.	±%
1869	305	—
1880	310	+1.6%
1890	327	+5.5%
1900	314	−4.0%
1910	342	+8.9%
1921	285	−16.7%
1930	285	+0.0%
1950	198	−30.5%
1961	208	+5.1%
1970	187	−10.1%
1980	209	+11.8%
1991	211	+1.0%
2001	241	+14.2%
2011	244	+1.2%
2021	265	+8.6%
Source: Censuses
