= Třebějice =

- Municipality
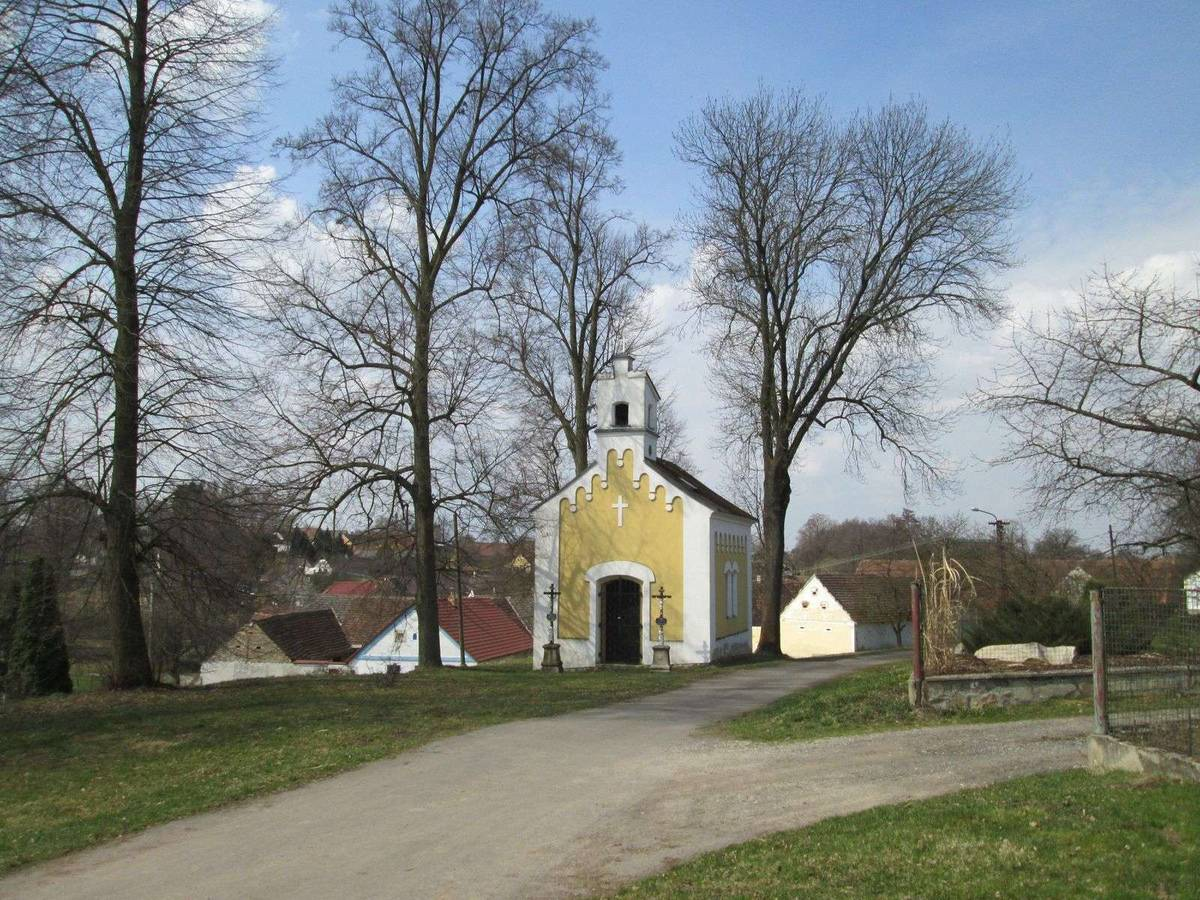
- Chapel of Saint John of Nepomuk

- Location in the Czech Republic
- Coordinates: 49°14′40″N 14°49′11″E
- Country: Czech Republic
- Region: South Bohemian
- District: Tábor
- First mentioned: 1545

Area
  - Total: 6.12 km^{2} (2.36 sq mi)
- Elevation: 455 m (1,493 ft)

Population (2026-01-01)
  - Total: 72
  - Density: 12/km^{2} (30/sq mi)
- Time zone: UTC+1 (CET)
  - Summer (DST): UTC+2 (CEST)
- Postal code: 392 01
- Website: www.trebejice.cz

Třebějice is a municipality and village in Tábor District in the South Bohemian Region of the Czech Republic. It has about 70 inhabitants.

Třebějice lies approximately 22 kilometres (14 mi) south-east of Tábor, 38 km (24 mi) north-east of České Budějovice, and 98 km (61 mi) south of Prague.

== Demographics ==
Historical population
Year	Pop.	±%
1869	258	—
1880	261	+1.2%
1890	250	−4.2%
1900	256	+2.4%
1910	243	−5.1%
1921	228	−6.2%
1930	222	−2.6%
1950	182	−18.0%
1961	171	−6.0%
1970	130	−24.0%
1980	117	−10.0%
1991	88	−24.8%
2001	87	−1.1%
2011	72	−17.2%
2021	61	−15.3%
Source: Censuses
