= Skopytce =

- Municipality
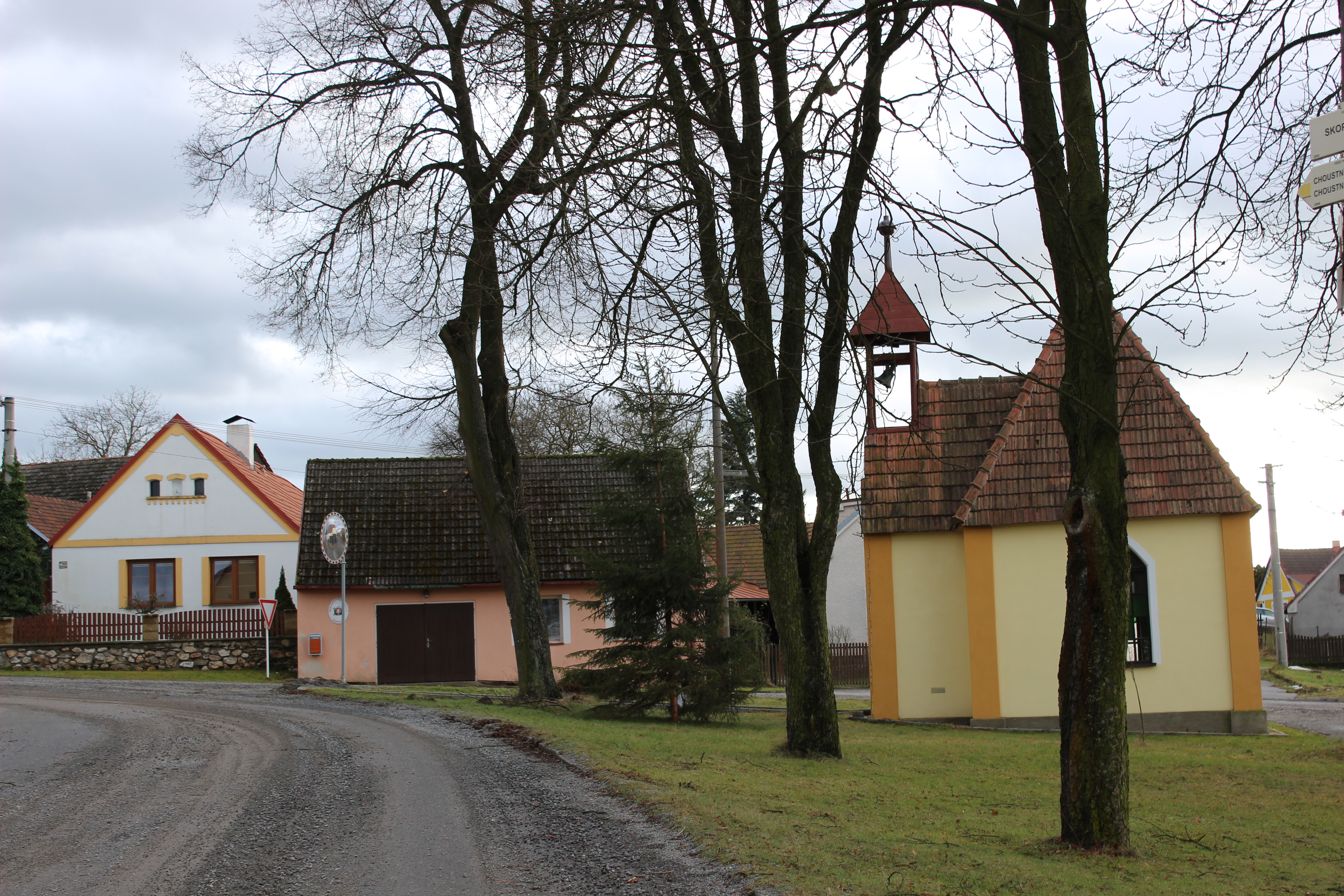
- Centre of Skopytce

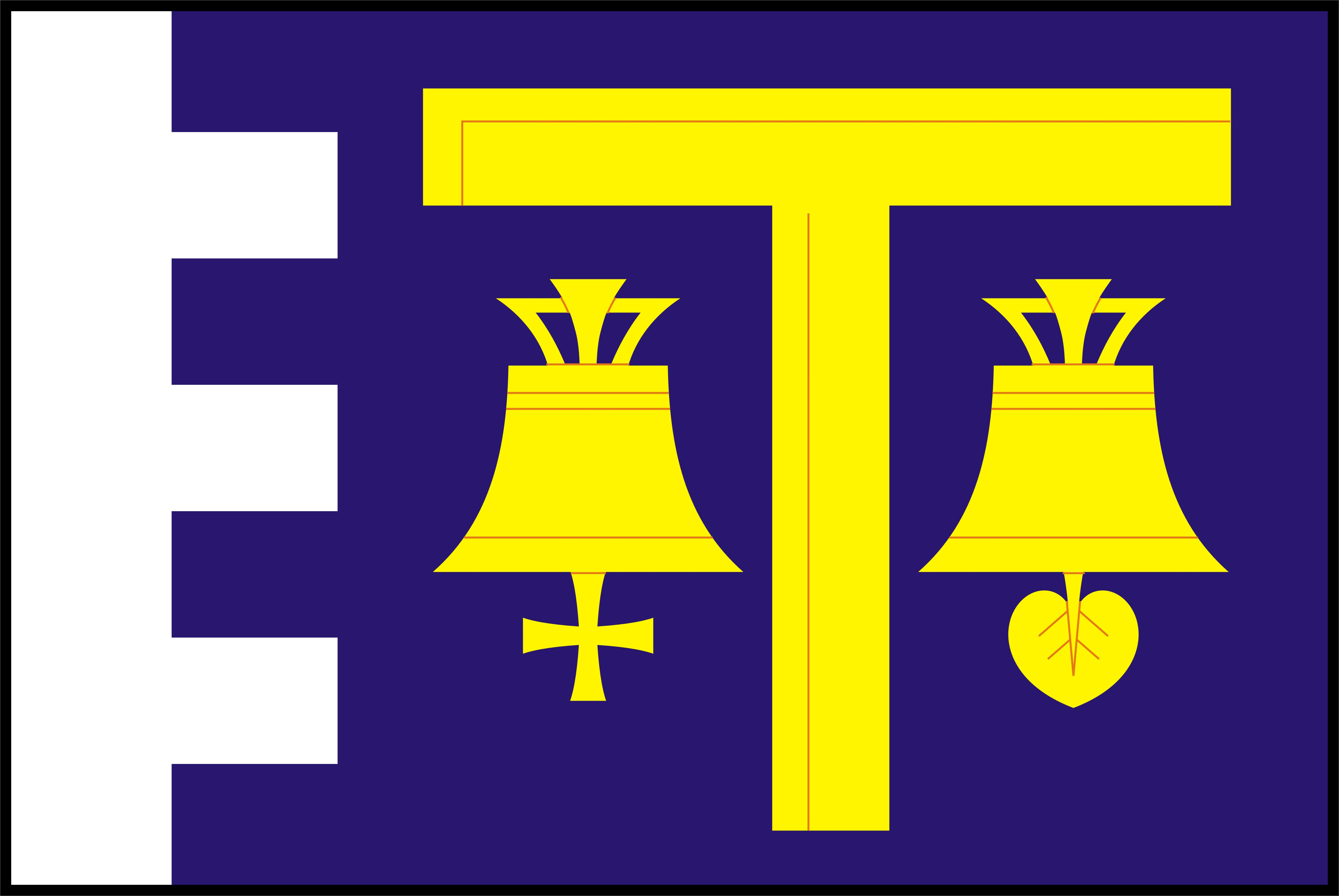
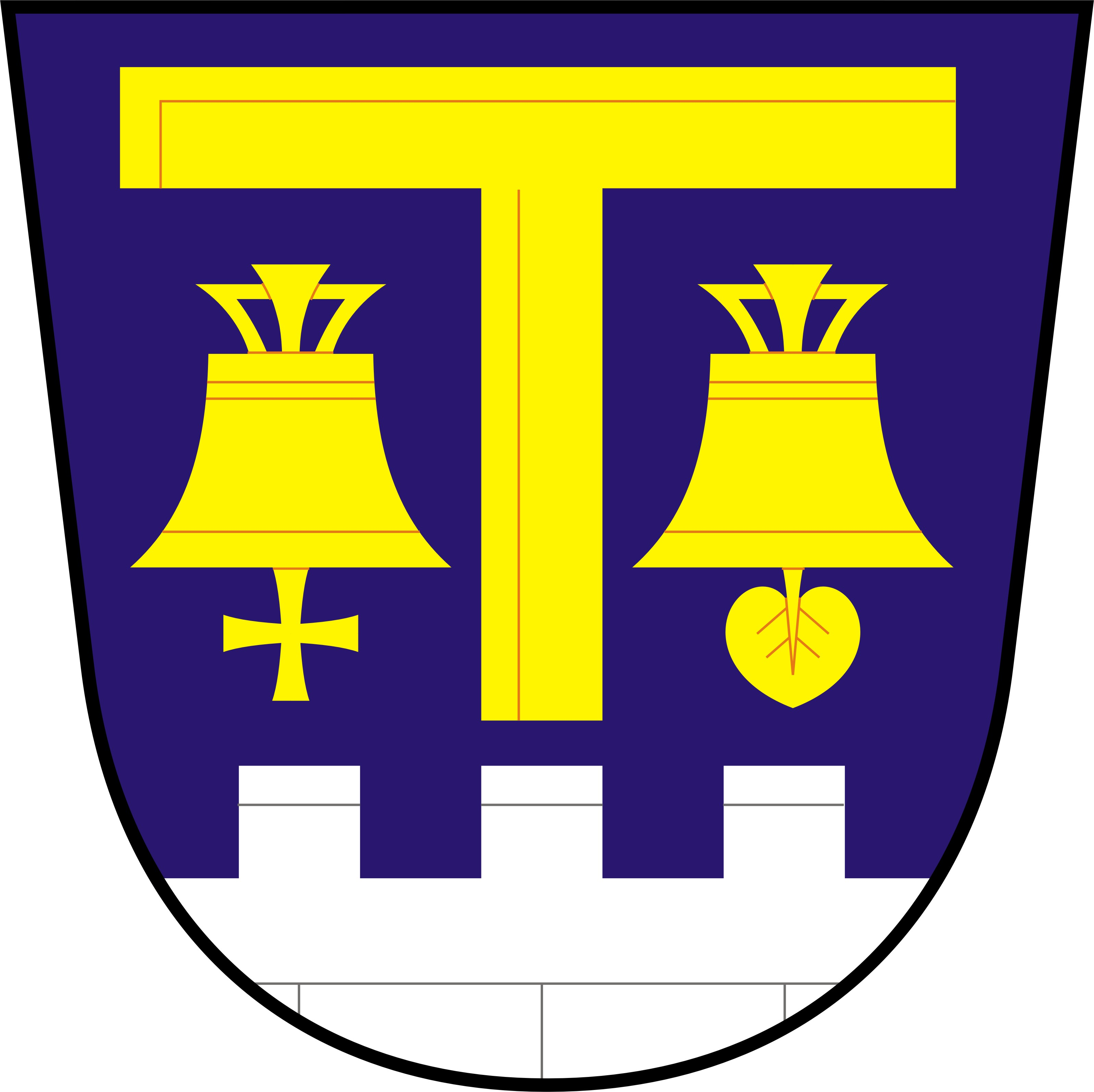
- Flag Coat of arms

- Location in the Czech Republic
- Coordinates: 49°19′53″N 14°47′53″E
- Country: Czech Republic
- Region: South Bohemian
- District: Tábor
- First mentioned: 1368

Area
  - Total: 7.11 km^{2} (2.75 sq mi)
- Elevation: 498 m (1,634 ft)

Population (2026-01-01)
  - Total: 170
  - Density: 24/km^{2} (62/sq mi)
- Time zone: UTC+1 (CET)
  - Summer (DST): UTC+2 (CEST)
- Postal code: 392 01
- Website: www.skopytce.cz

Skopytce is a municipality and village in Tábor District in the South Bohemian Region of the Czech Republic. It has about 200 inhabitants.

Skopytce lies approximately 14 kilometres (9 mi) south-east of Tábor, 47 km (29 mi) north-east of České Budějovice, and 88 km (55 mi) south of Prague.

== Administrative division ==
Skopytce consists of two municipal parts (in brackets population according to the 2021 census):

- Skopytce (109)
- Chabrovice (67)

== Demographics ==
Historical population
| Year | Pop. | ±% |
|---|---|---|
| 1869 | 361 | — |
| 1880 | 400 | +10.8% |
| 1890 | 360 | −10.0% |
| 1900 | 354 | −1.7% |
| 1910 | 366 | +3.4% |
| 1921 | 340 | −7.1% |
| 1930 | 313 | −7.9% |
| 1950 | 270 | −13.7% |
| 1961 | 258 | −4.4% |
| 1970 | 244 | −5.4% |
| 1980 | 210 | −13.9% |
| 1991 | 214 | +1.9% |
| 2001 | 161 | −24.8% |
| 2011 | 150 | −6.8% |
| 2021 | 176 | +17.3% |
Source: Censuses
