= Jedlany =

- Municipality
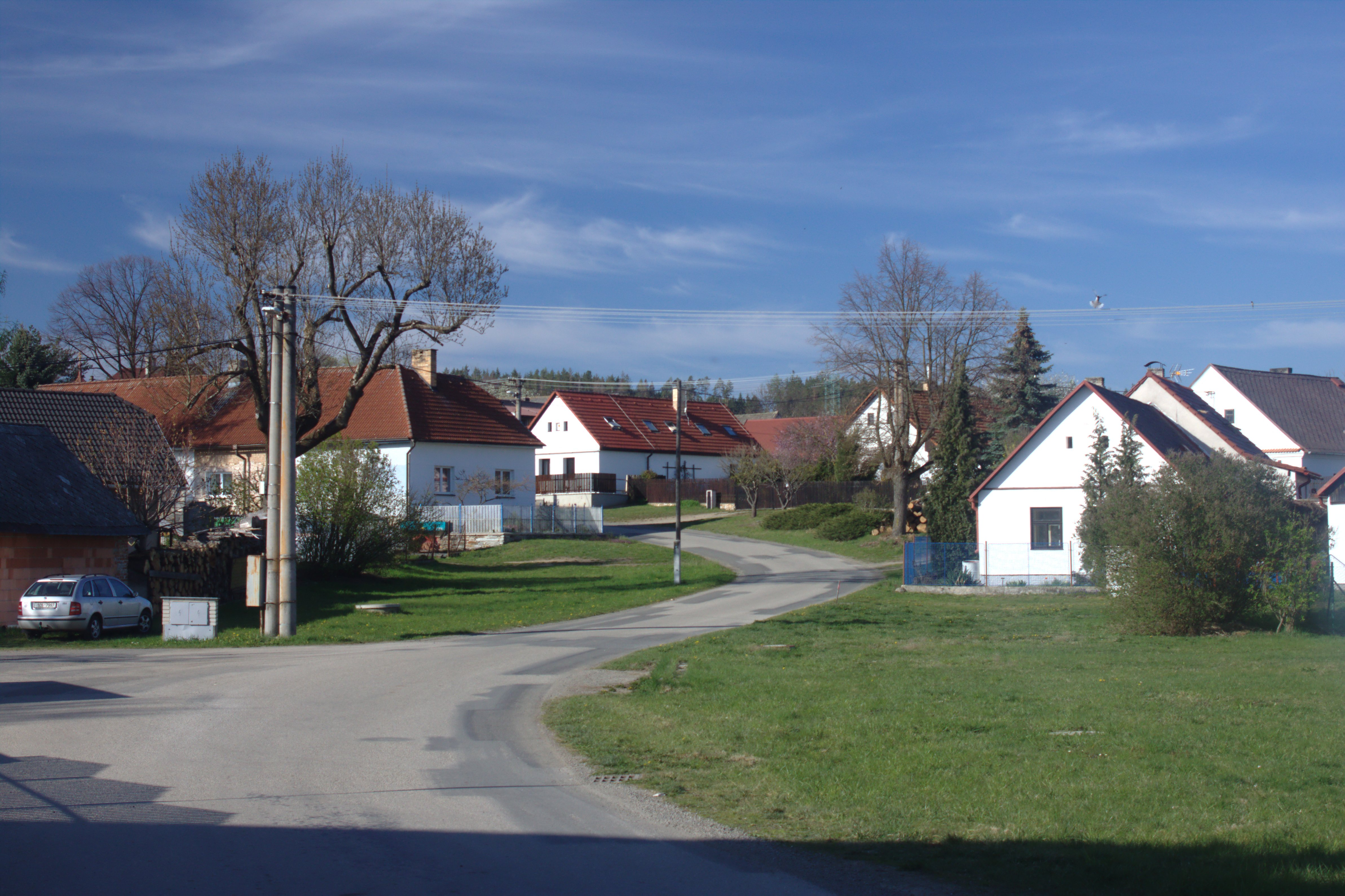
- Main road

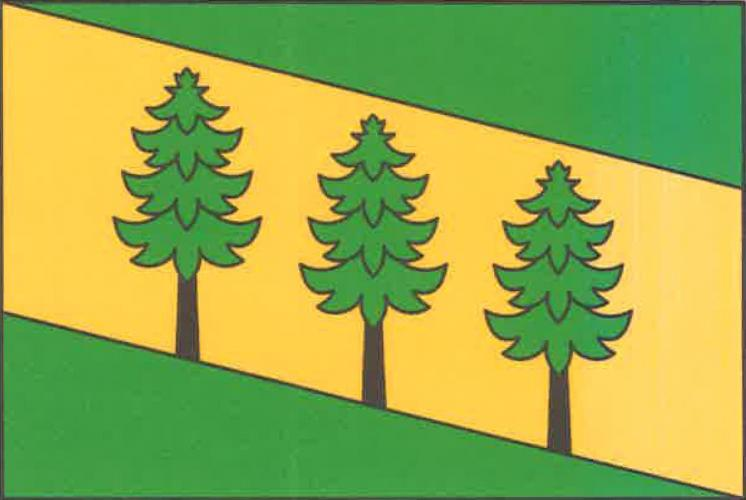
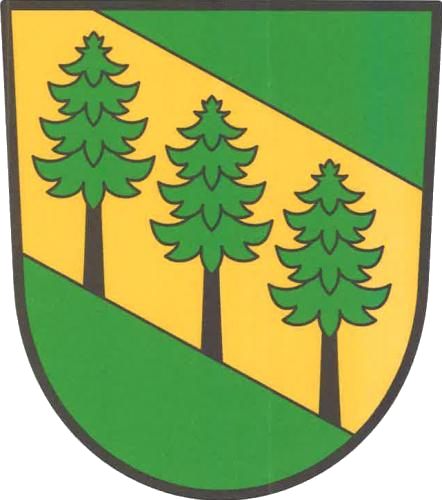
- Flag Coat of arms

- Location in the Czech Republic
- Coordinates: 49°29′41″N 14°42′59″E
- Country: Czech Republic
- Region: South Bohemian
- District: Tábor
- First mentioned: 1369

Area
  - Total: 4.21 km^{2} (1.63 sq mi)
- Elevation: 486 m (1,594 ft)

Population (2026-01-01)
  - Total: 72
  - Density: 17/km^{2} (44/sq mi)
- Time zone: UTC+1 (CET)
  - Summer (DST): UTC+2 (CEST)
- Postal code: 391 37
- Website: www.jedlany.cz

Jedlany is a municipality and village in Tábor District in the South Bohemian Region of the Czech Republic. It has about 70 inhabitants.

Jedlany lies approximately 10 kilometres (6 mi) north-east of Tábor, 60 km (37 mi) north of České Budějovice, and 70 km (43 mi) south of Prague.

== Demographics ==
Historical population
| Year | Pop. | ±% |
|---|---|---|
| 1869 | 316 | — |
| 1880 | 341 | +7.9% |
| 1890 | 391 | +14.7% |
| 1900 | 318 | −18.7% |
| 1910 | 281 | −11.6% |
| 1921 | 271 | −3.6% |
| 1930 | 225 | −17.0% |
| 1950 | 175 | −22.2% |
| 1961 | 178 | +1.7% |
| 1970 | 153 | −14.0% |
| 1980 | 110 | −28.1% |
| 1991 | 77 | −30.0% |
| 2001 | 68 | −11.7% |
| 2011 | 70 | +2.9% |
| 2021 | 79 | +12.9% |
Source: Censuses
