= Tábor District =

Tábor District Okres Tábor
- District
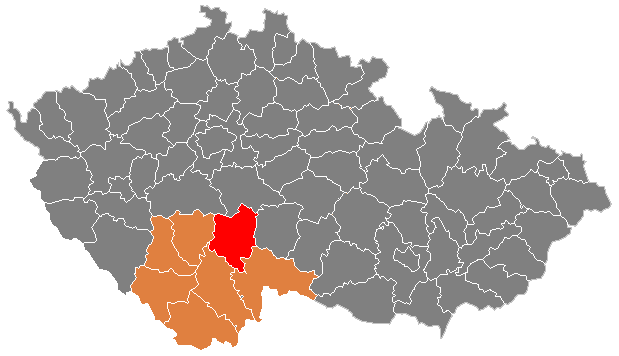
- Location in the South Bohemian Region within the Czech Republic
- Coordinates: 49°23′N 14°41′E
- Country: Czech Republic
- Region: South Bohemian
- Capital: Tábor

Area
  - Total: 1,326.36 km^{2} (512.11 sq mi)

Population (2026)
  - Total: 104,193
  - Density: 78.5556/km^{2} (203.458/sq mi)
- Time zone: UTC+1 (CET)
  - Summer (DST): UTC+2 (CEST)
- Municipalities: 110
- * Towns: 9
- * Market towns: 3

Tábor District (Czech: okres Tábor) is a district in the South Bohemian Region of the Czech Republic. Its capital is the town of Tábor.

== Administrative division ==
Tábor District is divided into two administrative districts of municipalities with extended competence: Tábor and Soběslav.

=== List of municipalities ===
Towns are marked in bold and market towns in italics:

Balkova Lhota - Bechyně - Bečice - Běleč - Borkovice - Borotín - Bradáčov - Březnice - Budislav - Černýšovice - Chotěmice - Chotoviny - Choustník - Chrbonín - Chýnov - Dírná - Dlouhá Lhota - Dobronice u Bechyně - Dolní Hořice - Dolní Hrachovice - Dráchov - Drahov - Dražice - Dražičky - Drhovice - Haškovcova Lhota - Hlasivo - Hlavatce - Hodětín - Hodonice - Jedlany - Jistebnice - Katov - Klenovice - Komárov - Košice - Košín - Krátošice - Krtov - Libějice - Lom - Malšice - Mažice - Meziříčí - Mezná - Mladá Vožice - Mlýny - Myslkovice - Nadějkov - Nasavrky - Nemyšl - Nová Ves u Chýnova - Nová Ves u Mladé Vožice - Oldřichov - Opařany - Planá nad Lužnicí - Pohnánec - Pohnání - Pojbuky - Přehořov - Psárov - Radenín - Radětice - Radimovice u Tábora - Radimovice u Želče - Radkov - Rataje - Ratibořské Hory - Řemíčov - Řepeč - Řípec - Rodná - Roudná - Šebířov - Sedlečko u Soběslavě - Sezimovo Ústí - Skalice - Skopytce - Skrýchov u Malšic - Slapsko - Slapy - Smilovy Hory - Soběslav - Stádlec - Sudoměřice u Bechyně - Sudoměřice u Tábora - Sviny - Svrabov - Tábor - Třebějice - Tučapy - Turovec - Ústrašice - Val - Vesce - Veselí nad Lužnicí - Vilice - Vlastiboř - Vlčeves - Vlkov - Vodice - Zadní Střítež - Záhoří - Zálší - Želeč - Zhoř u Mladé Vožice - Zhoř u Tábora - Žíšov Zlukov - Zvěrotice

== Geography ==
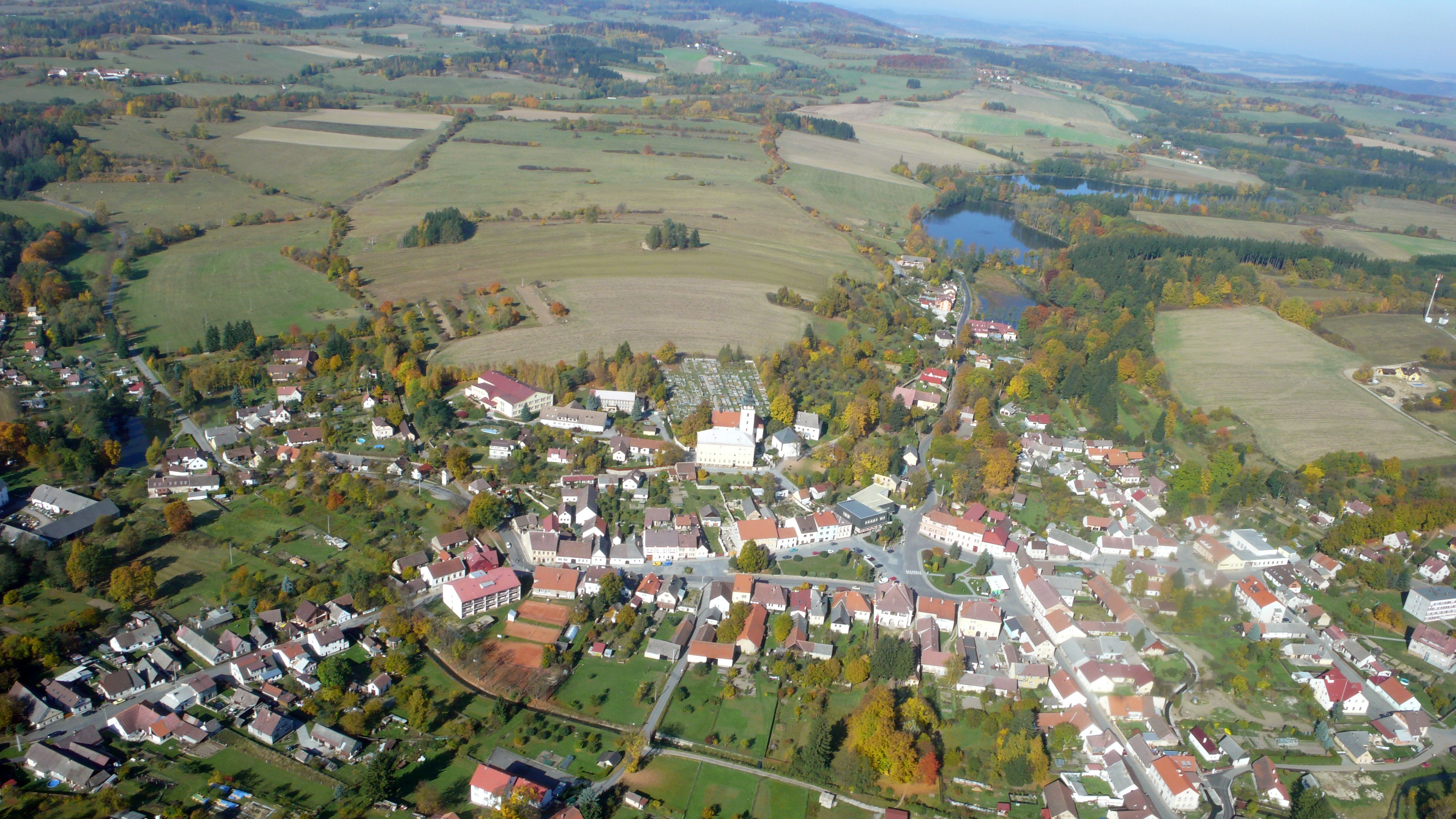
Jistebnice and surrounding landscape

Most of the territory is characterised by an undulating landscape that turns into the tectonic depression in the south. The territory extends into four geomorphological mesoregions: Tábor Uplands (west and centre), Vlašim Uplands (north), Křemešník Highlands (east) and Třeboň Basin (south). The highest point of the district is the hill Batkovy in Pohnání with an elevation of 724 m (2,375 ft) and the lowest point is the river bed of the Lužnice in Bechyně at 354 m (1,161 ft).

From the total district area of 1,326.4 km^{2} (512.1 sq mi), agricultural land occupies 776.7 km^{2} (299.9 sq mi), forests occupy 390.9 km^{2} (150.9 sq mi), and water area occupies 45.5 km^{2} (17.6 sq mi). Forests cover 29.5% of the district's area.

The territory is rich in watercourses and ponds. The most important river is the Lužnice, which flows into the territory in the south, flows through it and turns to the southwest. In the south, the Nežárka flows into it. The area of the Třeboň Basin is known for its fishpond system, including Horusický rybník, which is the second largest pond in the country with an area of 415 ha (1,030 acres). There are also many ponds in the rest of the district territory.

A small part of the protected landscape area of Třeboňsko extends into the district in the south.

== Demographics ==
Historical population

Year	Pop.	±%
1869	98,807	—
1880	101,649	+2.9%
1890	99,958	−1.7%
1900	100,368	+0.4%
1910	101,426	+1.1%

Year	Pop.	±%
1921	99,868	−1.5%
1930	97,052	−2.8%
1950	90,564	−6.7%
1961	97,521	+7.7%
1970	97,835	+0.3%

Year	Pop.	±%
1980	103,187	+5.5%
1991	103,978	+0.8%
2001	102,773	−1.2%
2011	101,115	−1.6%
2021	100,194	−0.9%

Source: Censuses

=== Most populous municipalities ===
Name	Population	Area (km^{2})
Tábor	34,339	62
Sezimovo Ústí	7,131	8
Soběslav	6,979	20
Veselí nad Lužnicí	6,492	30
Bechyně	4,757	21
Planá nad Lužnicí	4,604	21
Mladá Vožice	2,711	32
Chýnov	2,563	31
Jistebnice	2,121	58
Chotoviny	1,909	31

== Economy ==
The largest employers with headquarters in Tábor District and at least 500 employees are:

Economic entity	Location	Number of employees	Main activity
Tábor Hospital	Tábor	1,000–1,499	Health care
Flosman	Tábor	1,000–1,499	Retail trade

== Transport ==
The D3 motorway, part of European route E55 leading from Prague to České Budějovice, runs across the district.

== Sights ==
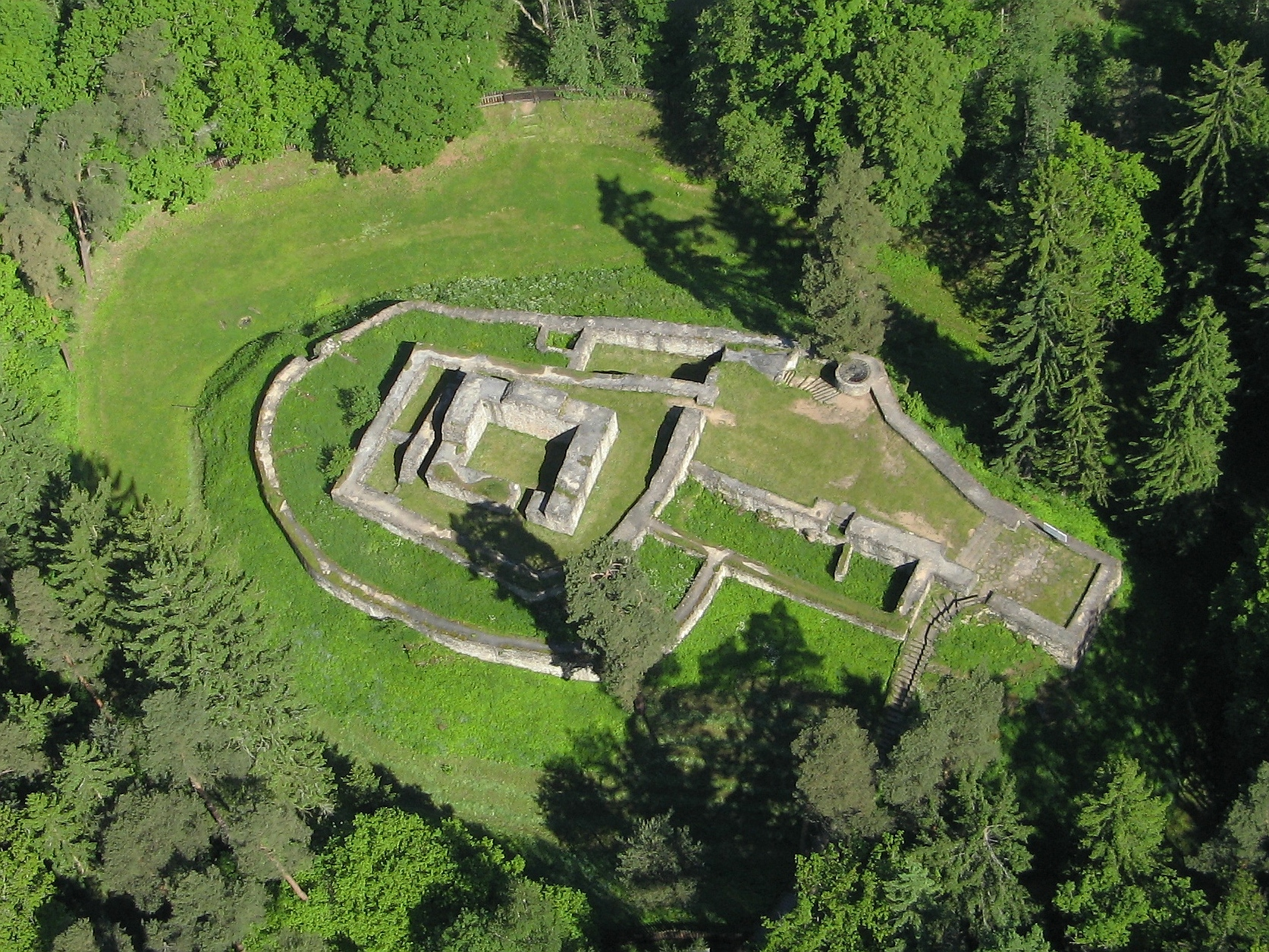
Ruin of Kozí hrádek Castle

The most important monuments in the district, protected as national cultural monuments, are:

- Kozí hrádek Castle in Sezimovo Ústí
- Old Town Hall in Tábor
- Kotnov Castle with Bechyňská Gate in Tábor
- Stádlec Suspension Bridge
- Bechyně Bridge
- Altar Wings of Roudníky
- Monastery with the Church of the Assumption of the Virgin Mary in Tábor-Klokoty

The best-preserved settlements, protected as monument reservations and monument zones, are:

- Tábor (monument reservation)
- Klečaty (monument reservation)
- Komárov (monument reservation)
- Mažice (monument reservation)
- Vlastiboř (monument reservation)
- Zálší (monument reservation)
- Záluží (monument reservation)
- Bechyně
- Soběslav
- Bechyňská Smoleč
- Debrník
- Nedvědice
- Ounuz
- Svinky

The most visited tourist destinations are the Tábor Zoo and Hussite Museum in Tábor.
