= Zlukov =

- Municipality
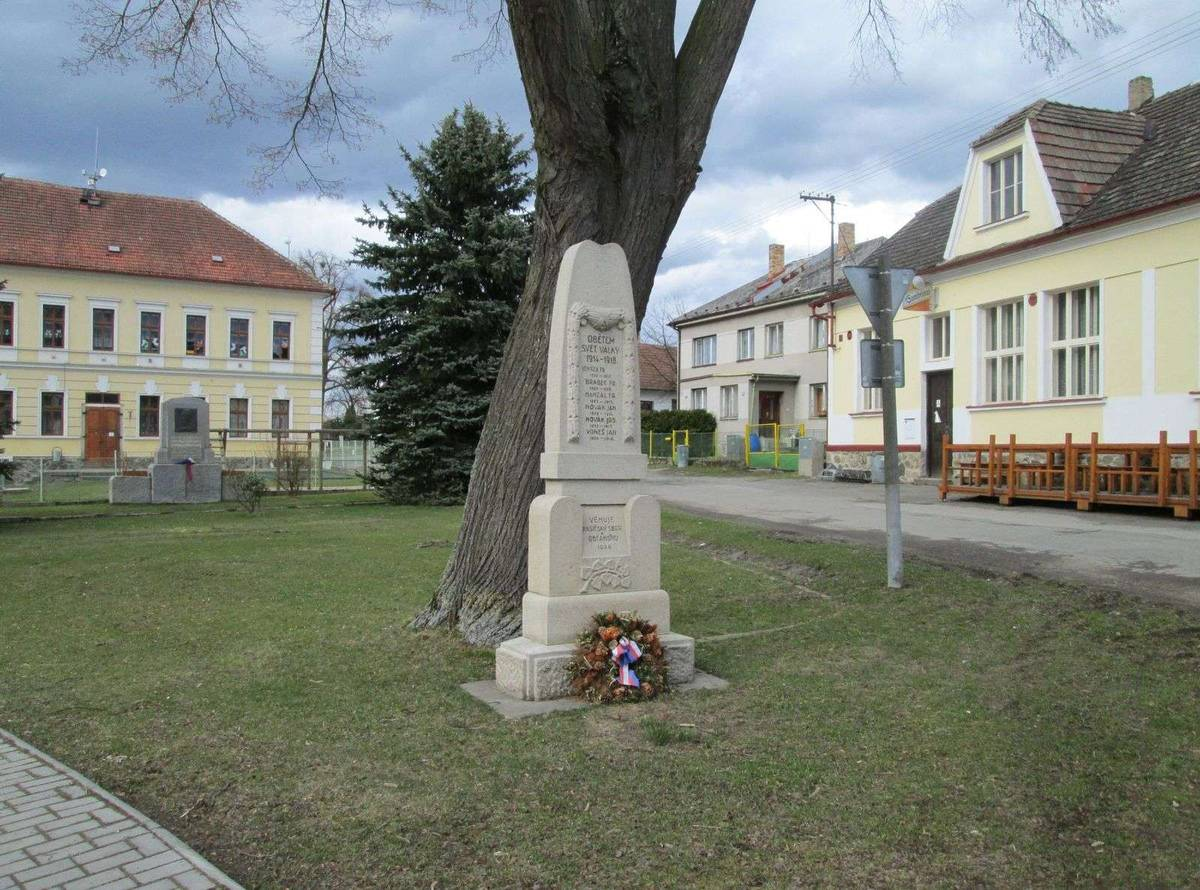
- Memorial to fallen

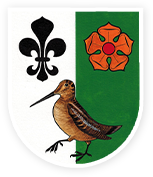
- Coat of arms

- Location in the Czech Republic
- Coordinates: 49°11′35″N 14°44′42″E
- Country: Czech Republic
- Region: South Bohemian
- District: Tábor
- First mentioned: 1200

Area
  - Total: 6.04 km^{2} (2.33 sq mi)
- Elevation: 439 m (1,440 ft)

Population (2026-01-01)
  - Total: 289
  - Density: 47.8/km^{2} (124/sq mi)
- Time zone: UTC+1 (CET)
  - Summer (DST): UTC+2 (CEST)
- Postal code: 391 81
- Website: www.zlukov.cz

Zlukov is a municipality and village in Tábor District in the South Bohemian Region of the Czech Republic. It has about 300 inhabitants.

Zlukov lies approximately 26 kilometres (16 mi) south of Tábor, 32 km (20 mi) north-east of České Budějovice, and 103 km (64 mi) south of Prague.

== Demographics ==
Historical population
Year	Pop.	±%
1869	362	—
1880	371	+2.5%
1890	357	−3.8%
1900	368	+3.1%
1910	391	+6.2%
1921	404	+3.3%
1930	386	−4.5%
1950	304	−21.2%
1961	294	−3.3%
1970	257	−12.6%
1980	239	−7.0%
1991	254	+6.3%
2001	232	−8.7%
2011	257	+10.8%
2021	260	+1.2%
Source: Censuses
