= Řípec =

- Municipality
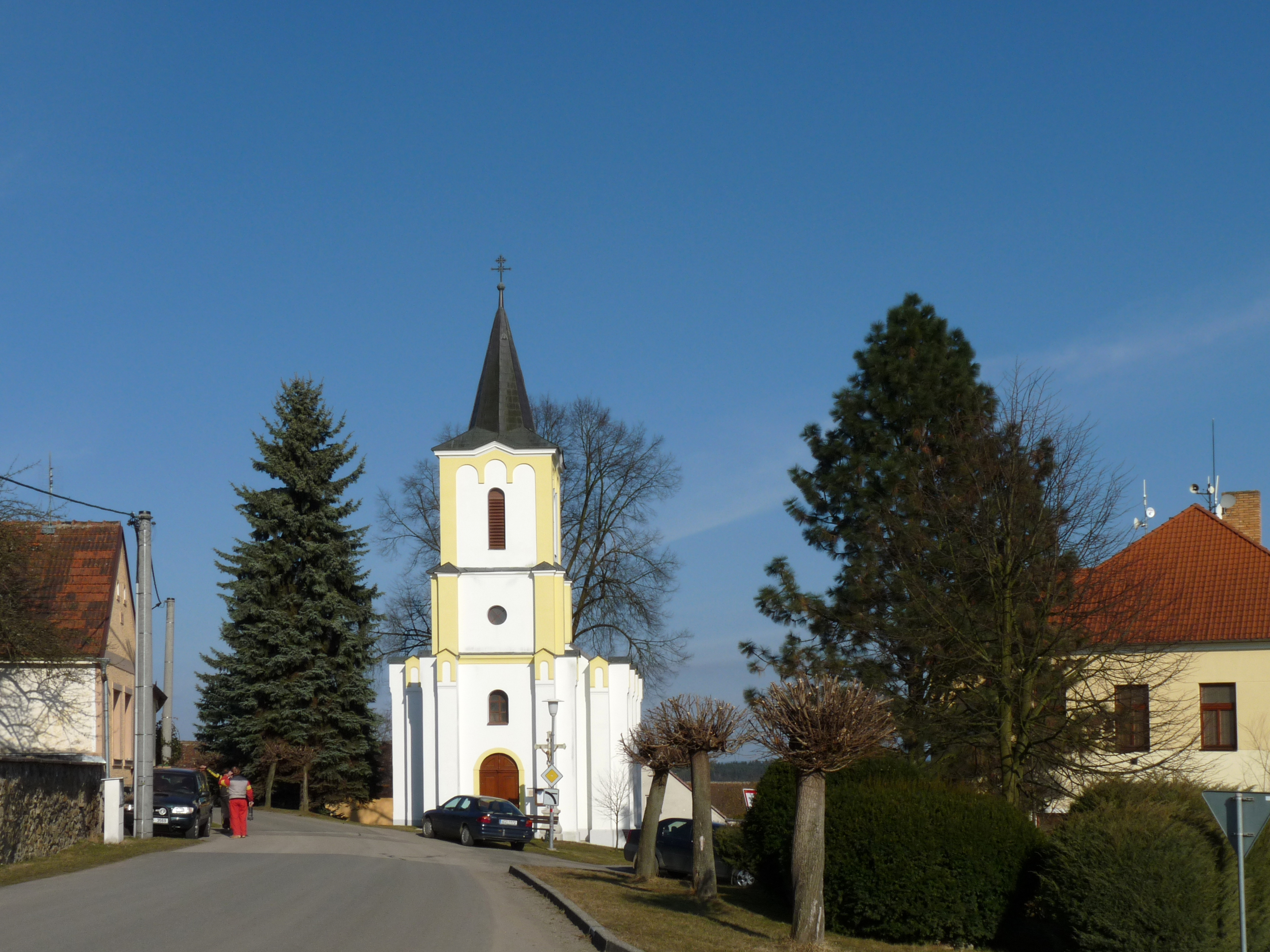
- Church of the Assumption of the Virgin Mary

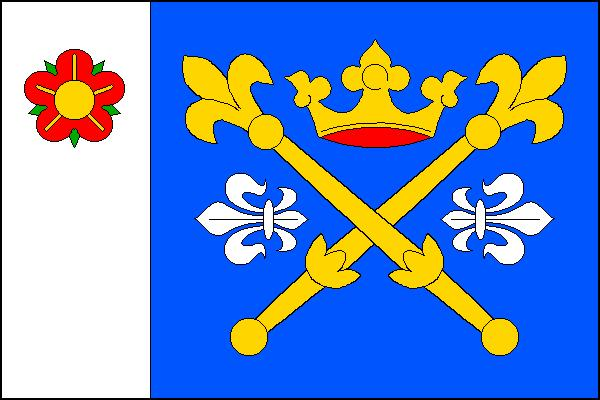
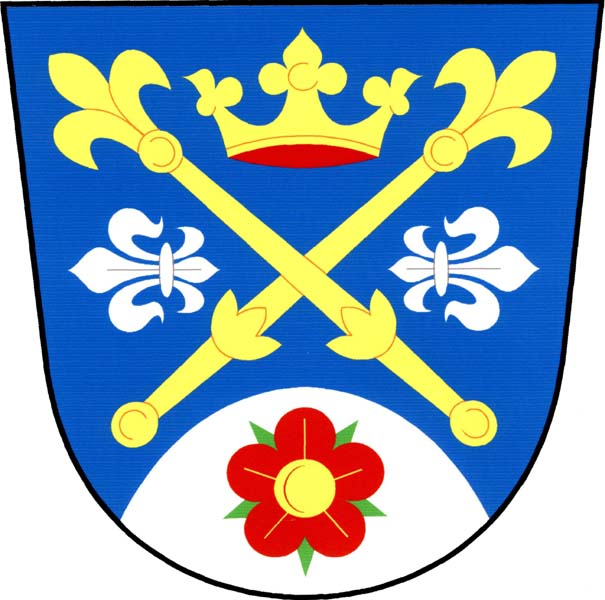
- Flag Coat of arms

- Location in the Czech Republic
- Coordinates: 49°12′51″N 14°44′12″E
- Country: Czech Republic
- Region: South Bohemian
- District: Tábor
- First mentioned: 1363

Area
  - Total: 7.41 km^{2} (2.86 sq mi)
- Elevation: 443 m (1,453 ft)

Population (2026-01-01)
  - Total: 339
  - Density: 45.7/km^{2} (118/sq mi)
- Time zone: UTC+1 (CET)
  - Summer (DST): UTC+2 (CEST)
- Postal code: 391 81
- Website: www.ripec.cz

Řípec is a municipality and village in Tábor District in the South Bohemian Region of the Czech Republic. It has about 300 inhabitants.

Řípec lies approximately 23 kilometres (14 mi) south of Tábor, 33 km (21 mi) north-east of České Budějovice, and 99 km (62 mi) south of Prague.

== Demographics ==
Historical population
Year	Pop.	±%
1869	377	—
1880	362	−4.0%
1890	400	+10.5%
1900	443	+10.7%
1910	469	+5.9%
1921	498	+6.2%
1930	468	−6.0%
1950	414	−11.5%
1961	439	+6.0%
1970	379	−13.7%
1980	335	−11.6%
1991	264	−21.2%
2001	287	+8.7%
2011	316	+10.1%
2021	350	+10.8%
Source: Censuses
