= Krtov =

- Municipality
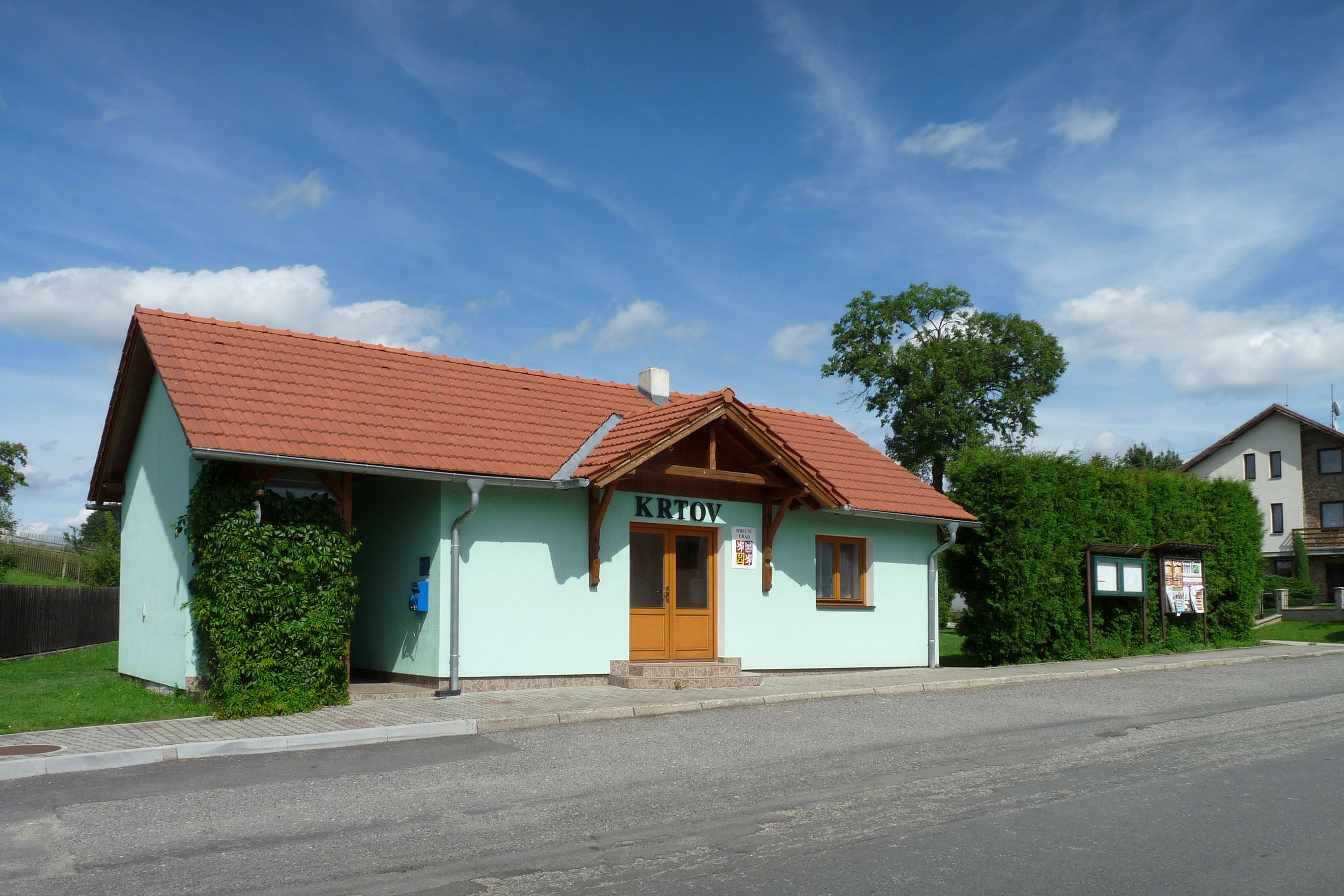
- Municipal office

- Location in the Czech Republic
- Coordinates: 49°20′55″N 14°49′57″E
- Country: Czech Republic
- Region: South Bohemian
- District: Tábor
- First mentioned: 1379

Area
  - Total: 4.56 km^{2} (1.76 sq mi)
- Elevation: 558 m (1,831 ft)

Population (2026-01-01)
  - Total: 170
  - Density: 37/km^{2} (97/sq mi)
- Time zone: UTC+1 (CET)
  - Summer (DST): UTC+2 (CEST)
- Postal code: 392 01
- Website: www.krtov.cz

Krtov is a municipality and village in Tábor District in the South Bohemian Region of the Czech Republic. It has about 200 inhabitants.

Krtov lies approximately 15 kilometres (9 mi) south-east of Tábor, 49 km (30 mi) north-east of České Budějovice, and 88 km (55 mi) south of Prague.

== Demographics ==
Historical population
Year	Pop.	±%
1869	286	—
1880	285	−0.3%
1890	275	−3.5%
1900	254	−7.6%
1910	268	+5.5%
1921	268	+0.0%
1930	234	−12.7%
1950	165	−29.5%
1961	170	+3.0%
1970	162	−4.7%
1980	161	−0.6%
1991	128	−20.5%
2001	141	+10.2%
2011	142	+0.7%
2021	160	+12.7%
Source: Censuses
