= Skrýchov u Malšic =

- Municipality
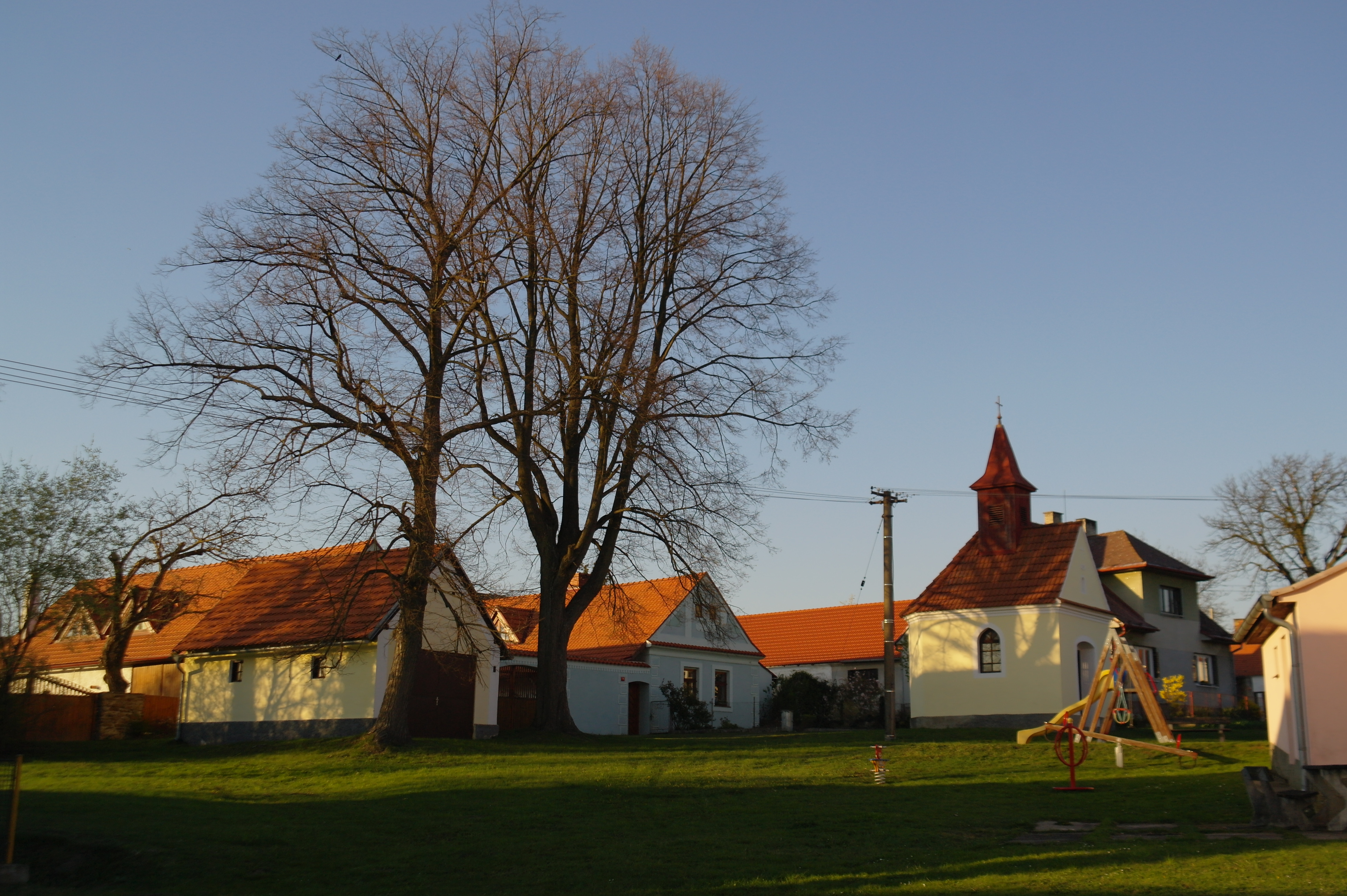
- Dudov, a part of Skrýchov u Malšic

- Location in the Czech Republic
- Coordinates: 49°19′49″N 14°35′48″E
- Country: Czech Republic
- Region: South Bohemian
- District: Tábor
- First mentioned: 1558

Area
  - Total: 7.02 km^{2} (2.71 sq mi)
- Elevation: 475 m (1,558 ft)

Population (2026-01-01)
  - Total: 156
  - Density: 22.2/km^{2} (57.6/sq mi)
- Time zone: UTC+1 (CET)
  - Summer (DST): UTC+2 (CEST)
- Postal code: 391 75
- Website: www.skrychov.cz

Skrýchov u Malšic is a municipality and village in Tábor District in the South Bohemian Region of the Czech Republic. It has about 200 inhabitants.

Skrýchov u Malšic lies approximately 11 kilometres (7 mi) south-west of Tábor, 41 km (25 mi) north of České Budějovice, and 86 km (53 mi) south of Prague.

== Administrative division ==
Skrýchov u Malšic consists of two municipal parts (in brackets population according to the 2021 census):

- Skrýchov u Malšic (92)
- Dudov (44)

== Demographics ==
Historical population
| Year | Pop. | ±% |
|---|---|---|
| 1869 | 325 | — |
| 1880 | 358 | +10.2% |
| 1890 | 357 | −0.3% |
| 1900 | 362 | +1.4% |
| 1910 | 331 | −8.6% |
| 1921 | 307 | −7.3% |
| 1930 | 282 | −8.1% |
| 1950 | 209 | −25.9% |
| 1961 | 199 | −4.8% |
| 1970 | 168 | −15.6% |
| 1980 | 136 | −19.0% |
| 1991 | 107 | −21.3% |
| 2001 | 119 | +11.2% |
| 2011 | 124 | +4.2% |
| 2021 | 136 | +9.7% |
Source: Censuses
