= Krátošice =

Municipality in the Czech Republic

- Municipality
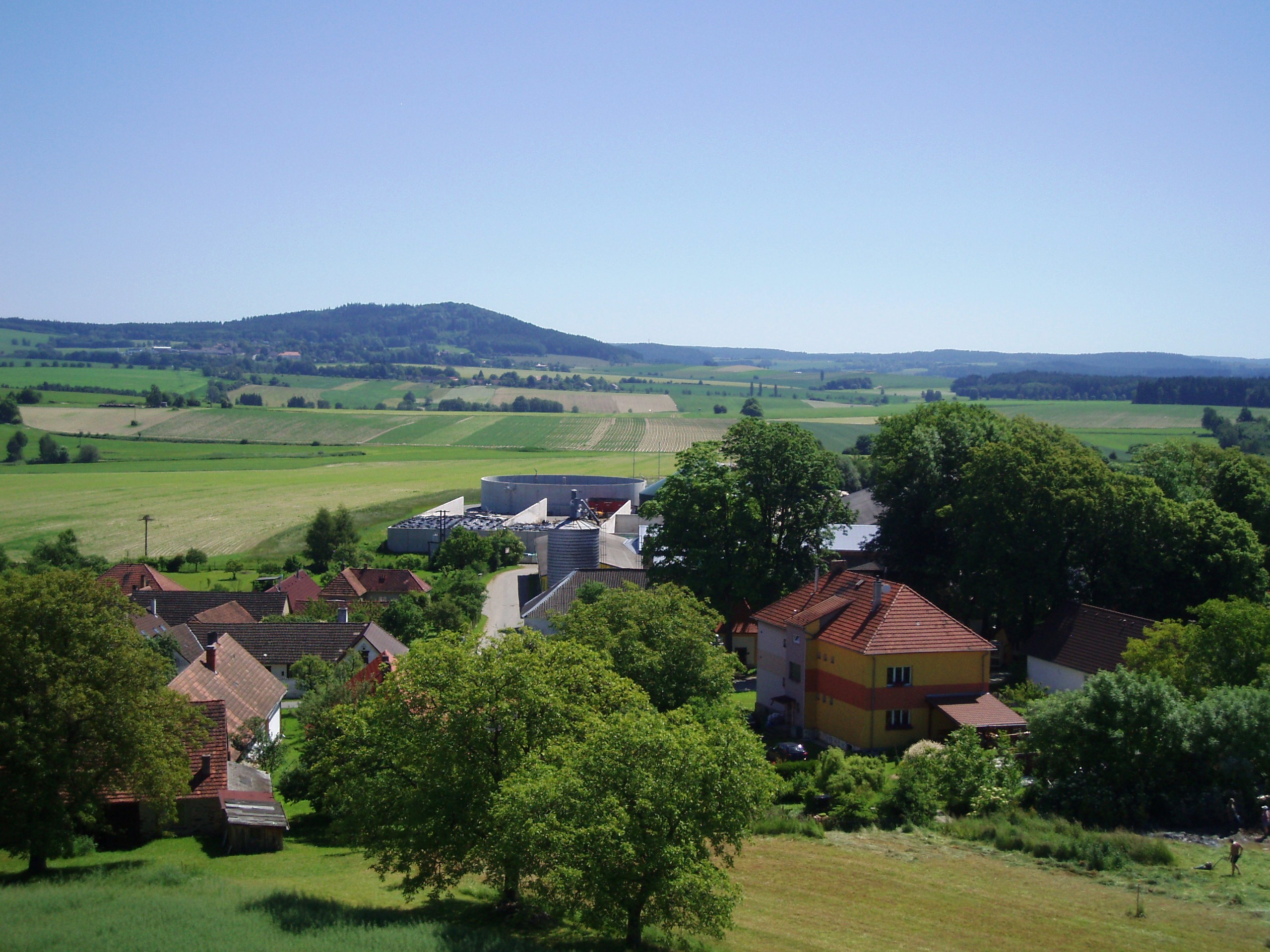
- View from the west

- Location in the Czech Republic
- Coordinates: 49°19′33″N 14°47′12″E
- Country: Czech Republic
- Region: South Bohemian
- District: Tábor
- First mentioned: 1250

Area
  - Total: 2.99 km^{2} (1.15 sq mi)
- Elevation: 423 m (1,388 ft)

Population (2026-01-01)
  - Total: 122
  - Density: 40.8/km^{2} (106/sq mi)
- Time zone: UTC+1 (CET)
  - Summer (DST): UTC+2 (CEST)
- Postal code: 391 61
- Website: www.obeckratosice.cz

Krátošice is a municipality and village in Tábor District in the South Bohemian Region of the Czech Republic. It has about 100 inhabitants.

Krátošice lies approximately 15 kilometres (9 mi) south-east of Tábor, 45 km (28 mi) north-east of České Budějovice, and 90 km (56 mi) south of Prague.

== Demographics ==
Historical population
Year	Pop.	±%
1869	235	—
1880	248	+5.5%
1890	211	−14.9%
1900	210	−0.5%
1910	210	+0.0%
1921	210	+0.0%
1930	205	−2.4%
1950	150	−26.8%
1961	154	+2.7%
1970	123	−20.1%
1980	115	−6.5%
1991	80	−30.4%
2001	118	+47.5%
2011	96	−18.6%
2021	109	+13.5%
Source: Censuses
