= Pohnánec =

- Municipality
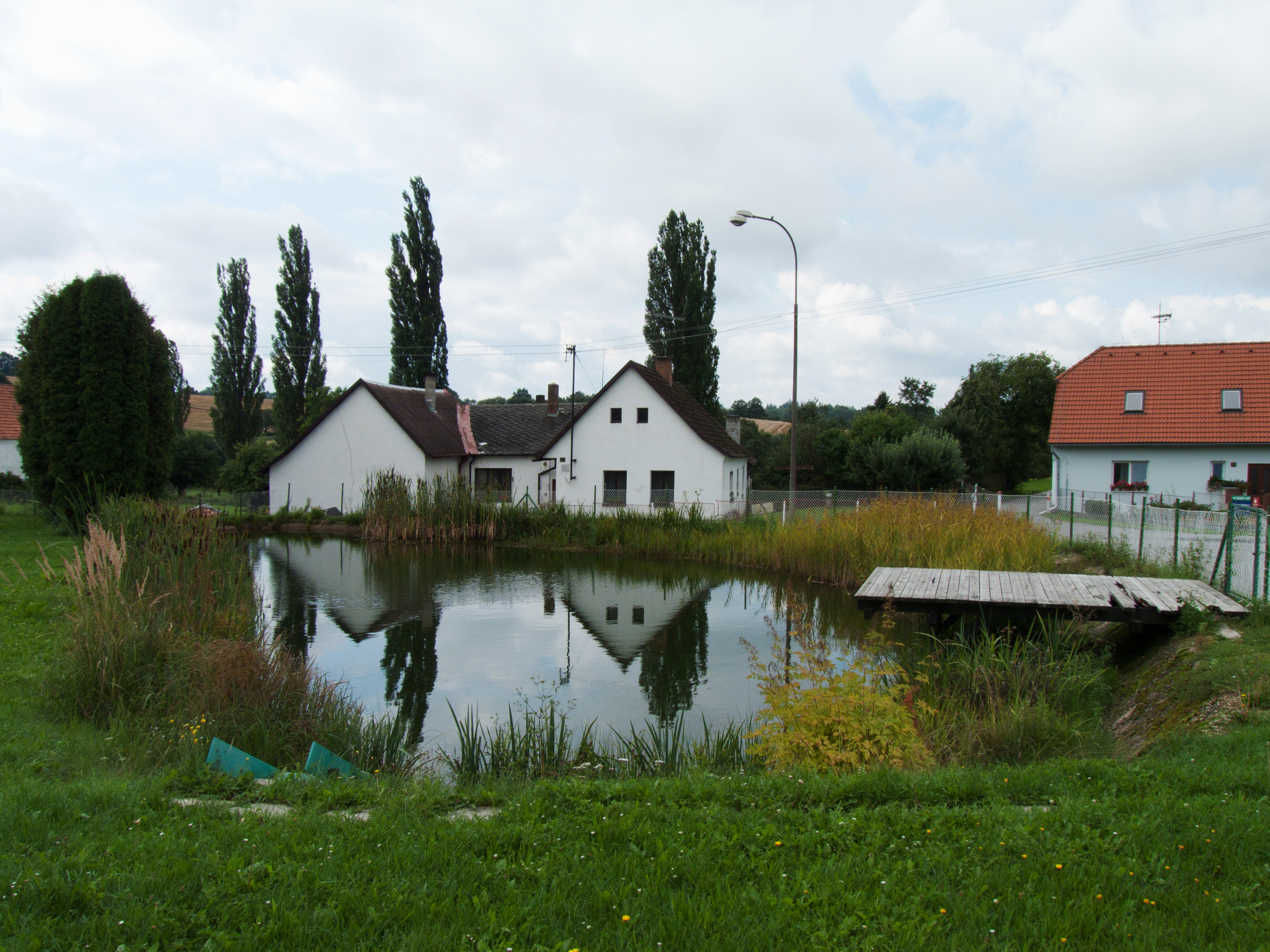
- Centre of Pohnánec

- Location in the Czech Republic
- Coordinates: 49°28′25″N 14°48′10″E
- Country: Czech Republic
- Region: South Bohemian
- District: Tábor
- First mentioned: 1369

Area
  - Total: 2.50 km^{2} (0.97 sq mi)
- Elevation: 578 m (1,896 ft)

Population (2026-01-01)
  - Total: 61
  - Density: 24/km^{2} (63/sq mi)
- Time zone: UTC+1 (CET)
  - Summer (DST): UTC+2 (CEST)
- Postal code: 391 43
- Website: www.pohnanec.cz

Pohnánec is a municipality and village in Tábor District in the South Bohemian Region of the Czech Republic. It has about 60 inhabitants.

Pohnánec lies approximately 13 kilometres (8 mi) north-east of Tábor, 61 km (38 mi) north-east of České Budějovice, and 74 km (46 mi) south of Prague.

== Demographics ==
Historical population
Year	Pop.	±%
1869	196	—
1880	193	−1.5%
1890	187	−3.1%
1900	171	−8.6%
1910	151	−11.7%
1921	140	−7.3%
1930	141	+0.7%
1950	107	−24.1%
1961	104	−2.8%
1970	89	−14.4%
1980	82	−7.9%
1991	68	−17.1%
2001	60	−11.8%
2011	56	−6.7%
2021	53	−5.4%
Source: Censuses
