= Žíšov =

- Municipality
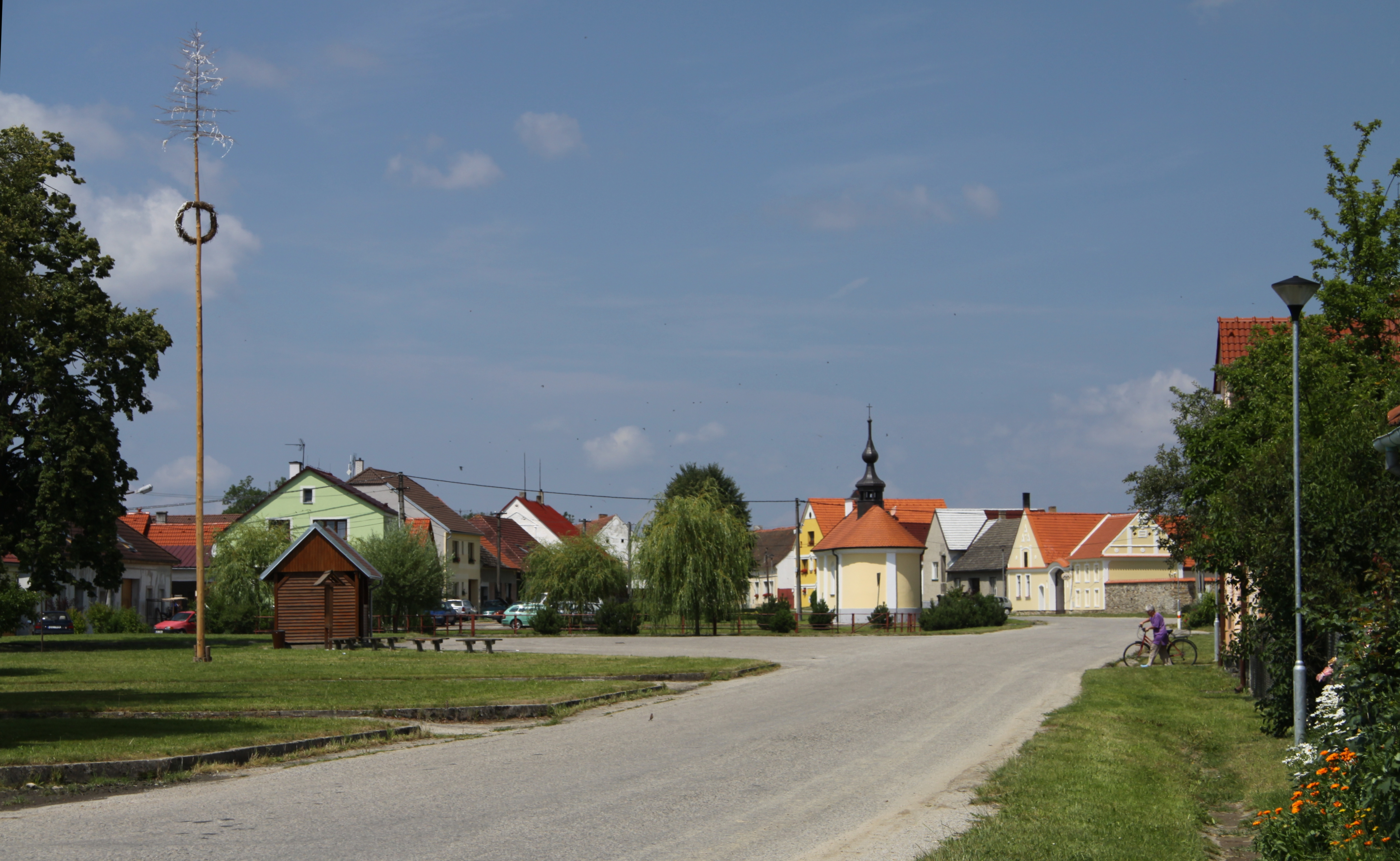
- Centre of Žíšov

- Location in the Czech Republic
- Coordinates: 49°12′0″N 14°41′36″E
- Country: Czech Republic
- Region: South Bohemian
- District: Tábor
- First mentioned: 1519

Area
  - Total: 4.73 km^{2} (1.83 sq mi)
- Elevation: 424 m (1,391 ft)

Population (2026-01-01)
  - Total: 280
  - Density: 59/km^{2} (150/sq mi)
- Time zone: UTC+1 (CET)
  - Summer (DST): UTC+2 (CEST)
- Postal code: 391 81
- Website: www.zisov.cz

Žíšov is a municipality and village in Tábor District in the South Bohemian Region of the Czech Republic. It has about 300 inhabitants.

Žíšov lies approximately 24 kilometres (15 mi) south of Tábor, 31 km (19 mi) north-east of České Budějovice, and 100 km (62 mi) south of Prague.

== Demographics ==
Historical population
Year	Pop.	±%
1869	200	—
1880	206	+3.0%
1890	228	+10.7%
1900	207	−9.2%
1910	250	+20.8%
1921	293	+17.2%
1930	332	+13.3%
1950	268	−19.3%
1961	226	−15.7%
1970	218	−3.5%
1980	185	−15.1%
1991	144	−22.2%
2001	140	−2.8%
2011	221	+57.9%
2021	233	+5.4%
Source: Censuses
