= Drahov =

- Municipality
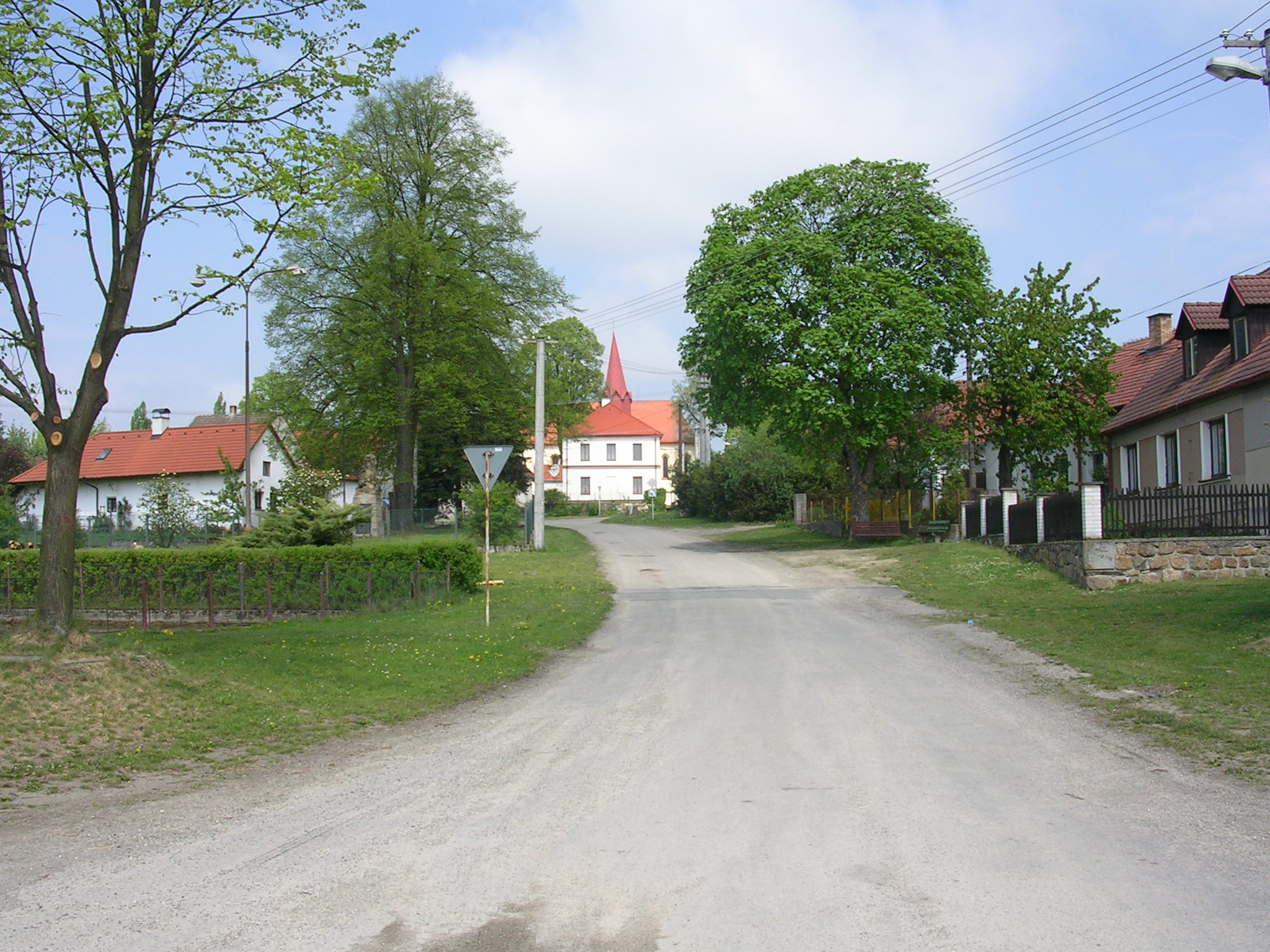
- Side street

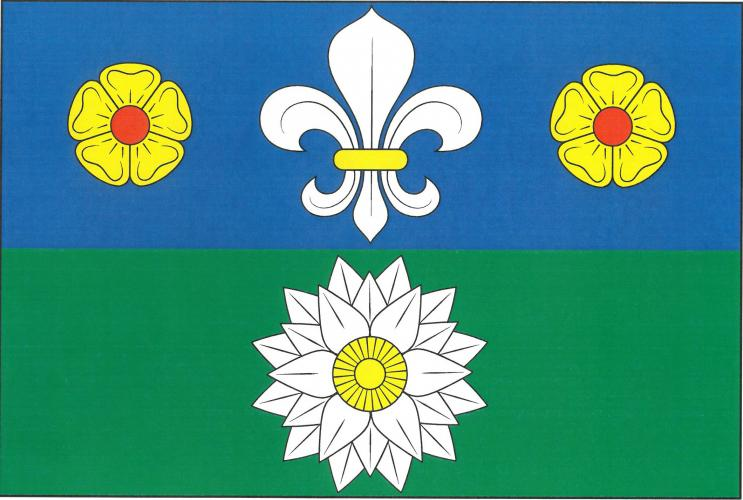
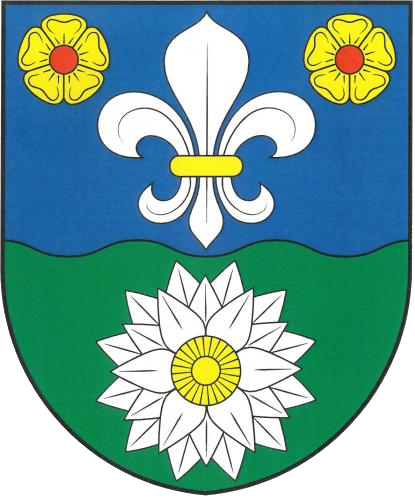
- Flag Coat of arms

- Location in the Czech Republic
- Coordinates: 49°10′32″N 14°45′15″E
- Country: Czech Republic
- Region: South Bohemian
- District: Tábor
- First mentioned: 1359

Area
  - Total: 10.97 km^{2} (4.24 sq mi)
- Elevation: 435 m (1,427 ft)

Population (2026-01-01)
  - Total: 149
  - Density: 13.6/km^{2} (35.2/sq mi)
- Time zone: UTC+1 (CET)
  - Summer (DST): UTC+2 (CEST)
- Postal codes: 378 21, 391 81
- Website: www.obec-drahov.cz

Drahov is a municipality and village in Tábor District in the South Bohemian Region of the Czech Republic. It has about 100 inhabitants.

Drahov lies approximately 28 kilometres (17 mi) south of Tábor, 32 km (20 mi) north-east of České Budějovice, and 105 km (65 mi) south of Prague.

== Demographics ==
Historical population
Year	Pop.	±%
1869	386	—
1880	377	−2.3%
1890	373	−1.1%
1900	433	+16.1%
1910	433	+0.0%
1921	416	−3.9%
1930	421	+1.2%
1950	258	−38.7%
1961	303	+17.4%
1970	263	−13.2%
1980	251	−4.6%
1991	195	−22.3%
2001	171	−12.3%
2011	160	−6.4%
2021	145	−9.4%
Source: Censuses
