= Přehořov =

- Municipality
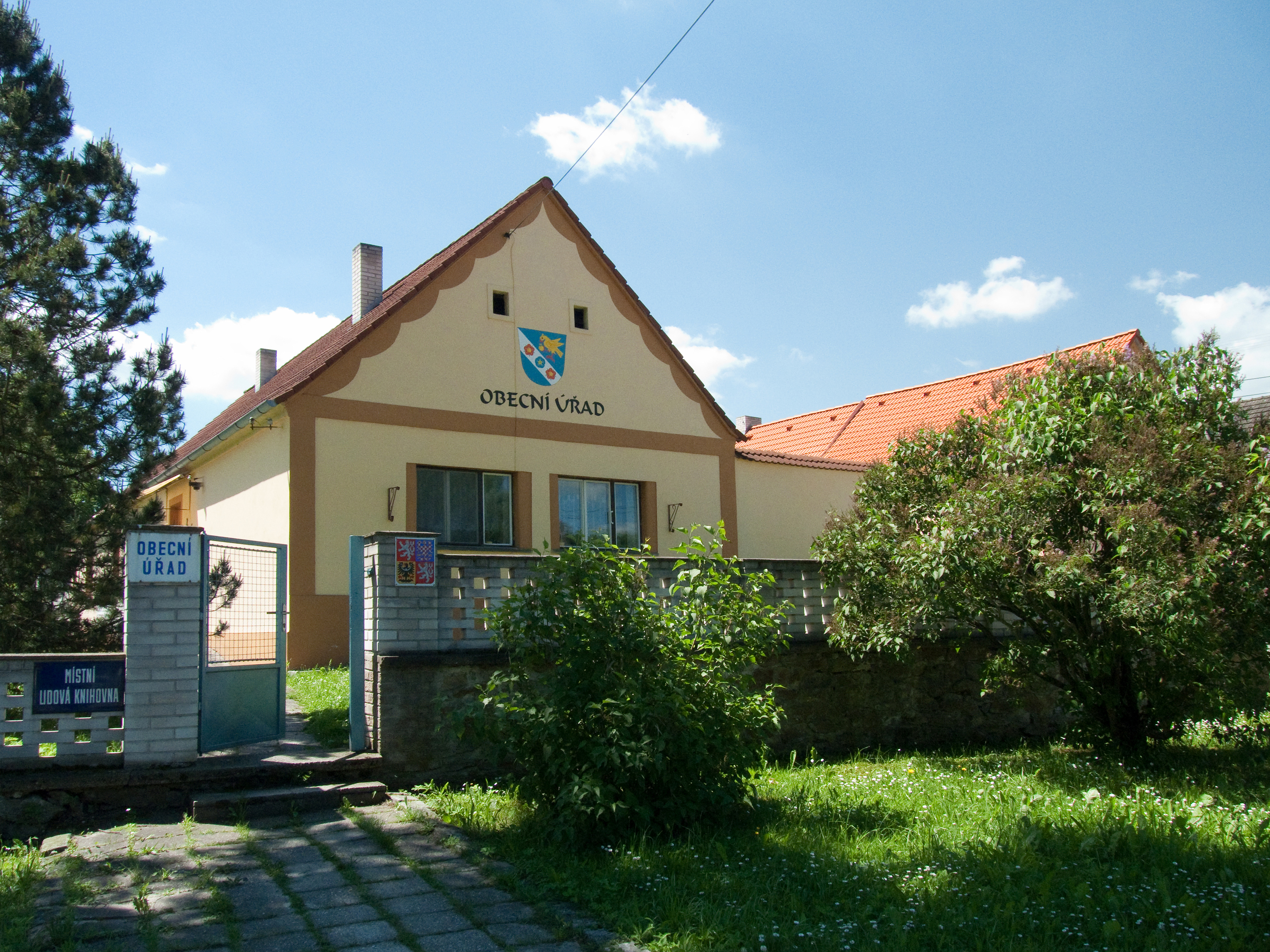
- Municipal office

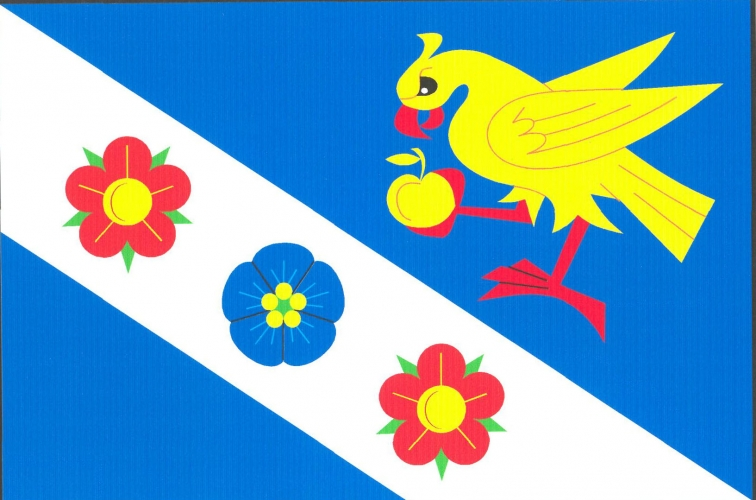
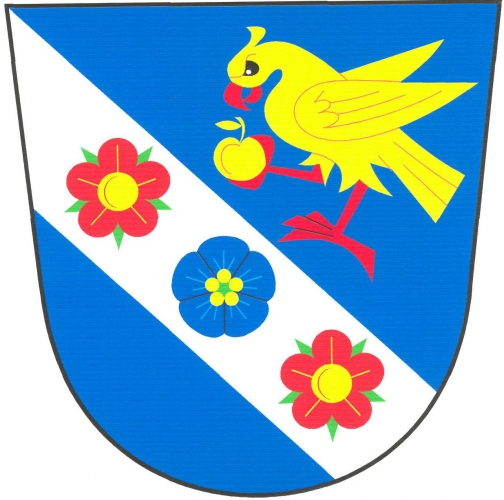
- Flag Coat of arms

- Location in the Czech Republic
- Coordinates: 49°14′52″N 14°45′23″E
- Country: Czech Republic
- Region: South Bohemian
- District: Tábor
- First mentioned: 1372

Area
  - Total: 9.56 km^{2} (3.69 sq mi)
- Elevation: 415 m (1,362 ft)

Population (2026-01-01)
  - Total: 352
  - Density: 36.8/km^{2} (95.4/sq mi)
- Time zone: UTC+1 (CET)
  - Summer (DST): UTC+2 (CEST)
- Postal code: 392 01
- Website: www.prehorov.cz

Přehořov is a municipality and village in Tábor District in the South Bohemian Region of the Czech Republic. It has about 400 inhabitants.

Přehořov lies approximately 21 kilometres (13 mi) south of Tábor, 36 km (22 mi) north-east of České Budějovice, and 97 km (60 mi) south of Prague.

== Administrative division ==
Přehořov consists of three municipal parts (in brackets population according to the 2021 census):

- Přehořov (197)
- Hrušova Lhota (46)
- Kvasejovice (76)

== Demographics ==
Historical population
Year	Pop.	±%
1869	755	—
1880	775	+2.6%
1890	695	−10.3%
1900	703	+1.2%
1910	655	−6.8%
1921	637	−2.7%
1930	617	−3.1%
1950	459	−25.6%
1961	443	−3.5%
1970	418	−5.6%
1980	353	−15.6%
1991	287	−18.7%
2001	313	+9.1%
2011	306	−2.2%
2021	319	+4.2%
Source: Censuses
