= Dráchov =

- Municipality
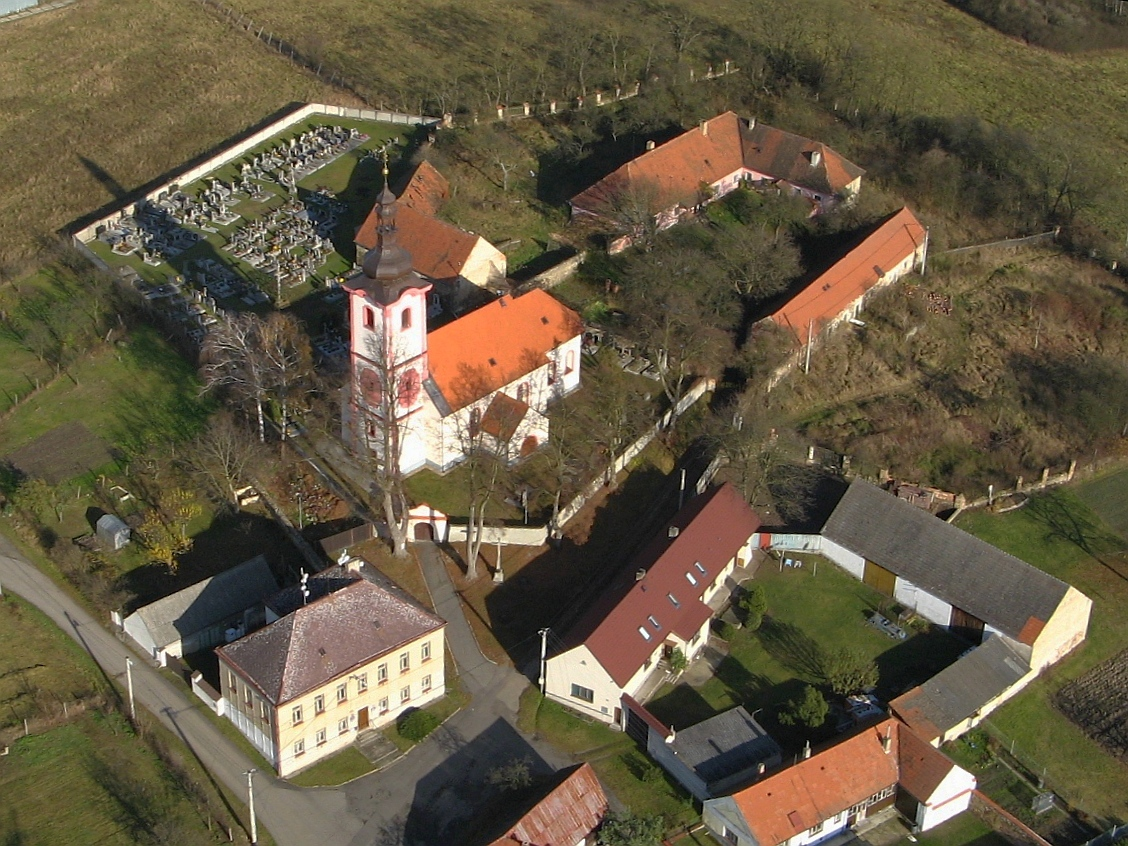
- Church of Saint Wenceslaus

- Location in the Czech Republic
- Coordinates: 49°13′35″N 14°42′24″E
- Country: Czech Republic
- Region: South Bohemian
- District: Tábor
- First mentioned: 1257

Area
  - Total: 9.71 km^{2} (3.75 sq mi)
- Elevation: 410 m (1,350 ft)

Population (2026-01-01)
  - Total: 229
  - Density: 23.6/km^{2} (61.1/sq mi)
- Time zone: UTC+1 (CET)
  - Summer (DST): UTC+2 (CEST)
- Postal code: 392 01
- Website: www.drachov.cz

Dráchov is a municipality and village in Tábor District in the South Bohemian Region of the Czech Republic. It has about 200 inhabitants.

Dráchov lies approximately 22 kilometres (14 mi) south of Tábor, 32 km (20 mi) north-east of České Budějovice, and 98 km (61 mi) south of Prague.

== Demographics ==
Historical population
Year	Pop.	±%
1869	530	—
1880	540	+1.9%
1890	495	−8.3%
1900	552	+11.5%
1910	583	+5.6%
1921	578	−0.9%
1930	575	−0.5%
1950	425	−26.1%
1961	408	−4.0%
1970	388	−4.9%
1980	331	−14.7%
1991	255	−23.0%
2001	260	+2.0%
2011	270	+3.8%
2021	217	−19.6%
Source: Censuses

== Notable people ==
- Jan Mládek (born 1960), economist and politician; lives here
