= Svrabov =

- Municipality
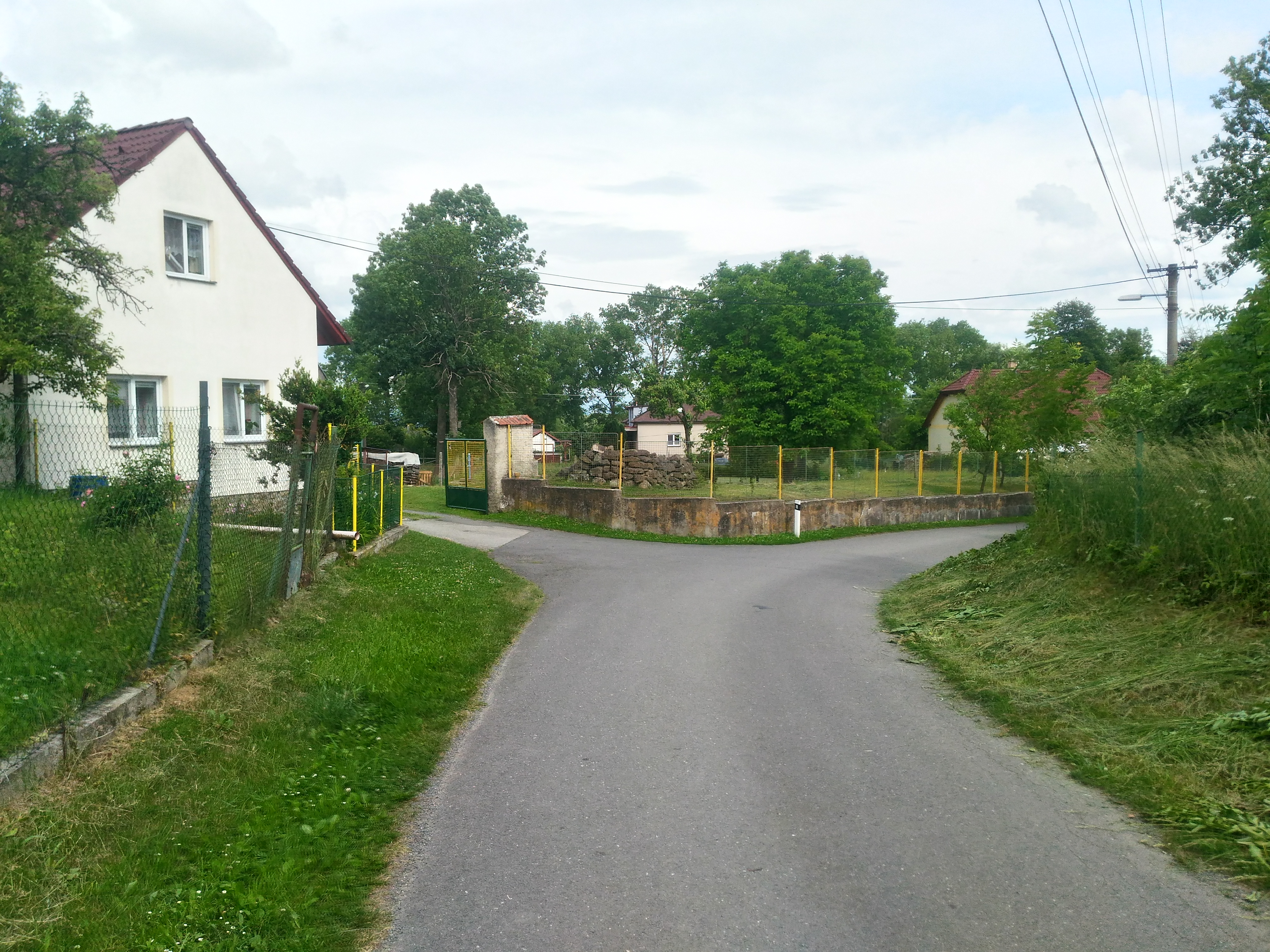
- A street in Svrabov

- Location in the Czech Republic
- Coordinates: 49°26′51″N 14°37′36″E
- Country: Czech Republic
- Region: South Bohemian
- District: Tábor
- First mentioned: 1318

Area
  - Total: 3.73 km^{2} (1.44 sq mi)
- Elevation: 479 m (1,572 ft)

Population (2026-01-01)
  - Total: 49
  - Density: 13/km^{2} (34/sq mi)
- Time zone: UTC+1 (CET)
  - Summer (DST): UTC+2 (CEST)
- Postal code: 391 31
- Website: www.svrabov.cz

Svrabov is a municipality and village in Tábor District in the South Bohemian Region of the Czech Republic. It has about 50 inhabitants.

Svrabov lies approximately 5 kilometres (3 mi) north-west of Tábor, 54 km (34 mi) north of České Budějovice, and 73 km (45 mi) south of Prague.

== Administrative division ==
Svrabov consists of two municipal parts (in brackets population according to the 2021 census):

- Svrabov (46)
- Hejlov (6)

== Demographics ==
Historical population
Year	Pop.	±%
1869	185	—
1880	177	−4.3%
1890	172	−2.8%
1900	173	+0.6%
1910	200	+15.6%
1921	182	−9.0%
1930	180	−1.1%
1950	111	−38.3%
1961	124	+11.7%
1970	109	−12.1%
1980	92	−15.6%
1991	78	−15.2%
2001	52	−33.3%
2011	52	+0.0%
2021	52	+0.0%
Source: Censuses
