= Želeč (Tábor District) =

- Municipality
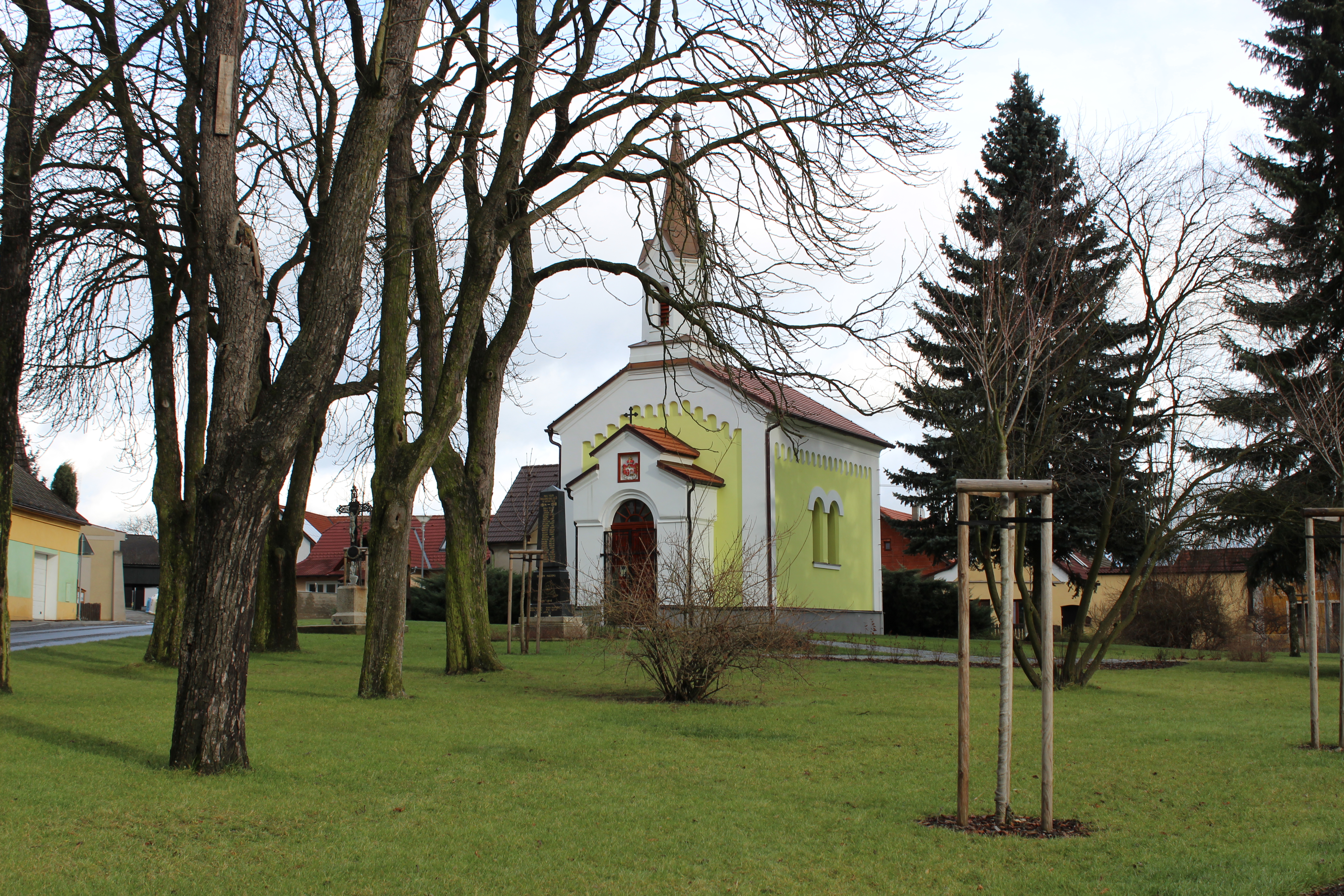
- A park and chapel in Želeč

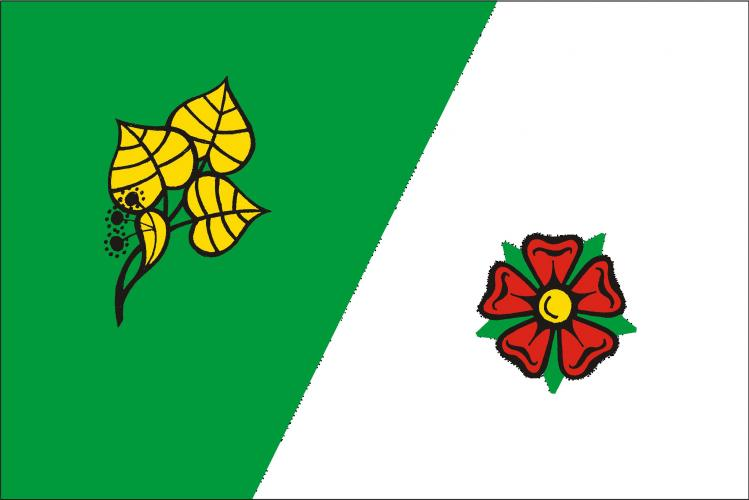
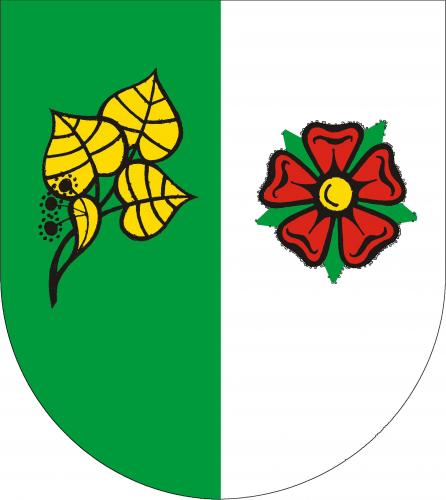
- Flag Coat of arms

- Location in the Czech Republic
- Coordinates: 49°19′6″N 14°38′48″E
- Country: Czech Republic
- Region: South Bohemian
- District: Tábor
- First mentioned: 1397

Area
  - Total: 15.75 km^{2} (6.08 sq mi)
- Elevation: 471 m (1,545 ft)

Population (2026-01-01)
  - Total: 1,046
  - Density: 66.41/km^{2} (172.0/sq mi)
- Time zone: UTC+1 (CET)
  - Summer (DST): UTC+2 (CEST)
- Postal codes: 391 74, 391 75
- Website: www.obeczelec.cz

Želeč is a municipality and village in Tábor District in the South Bohemian Region of the Czech Republic. It has about 1,000 inhabitants.

Želeč lies approximately 11 kilometres (7 mi) south of Tábor, 41 km (25 mi) north of České Budějovice, and 87 km (54 mi) south of Prague.

== Administrative division ==
Želeč consists of two municipal parts (in brackets population according to the 2021 census):

- Želeč (849)
- Bezděčín (105)

== Demographics ==
Historical population
| Year | Pop. | ±% |
|---|---|---|
| 1869 | 963 | — |
| 1880 | 1,115 | +15.8% |
| 1890 | 1,045 | −6.3% |
| 1900 | 1,099 | +5.2% |
| 1910 | 1,039 | −5.5% |
| 1921 | 983 | −5.4% |
| 1930 | 935 | −4.9% |
| 1950 | 760 | −18.7% |
| 1961 | 773 | +1.7% |
| 1970 | 686 | −11.3% |
| 1980 | 690 | +0.6% |
| 1991 | 716 | +3.8% |
| 2001 | 778 | +8.7% |
| 2011 | 908 | +16.7% |
| 2021 | 954 | +5.1% |
Source: Censuses
