= Mažice =

- Municipality
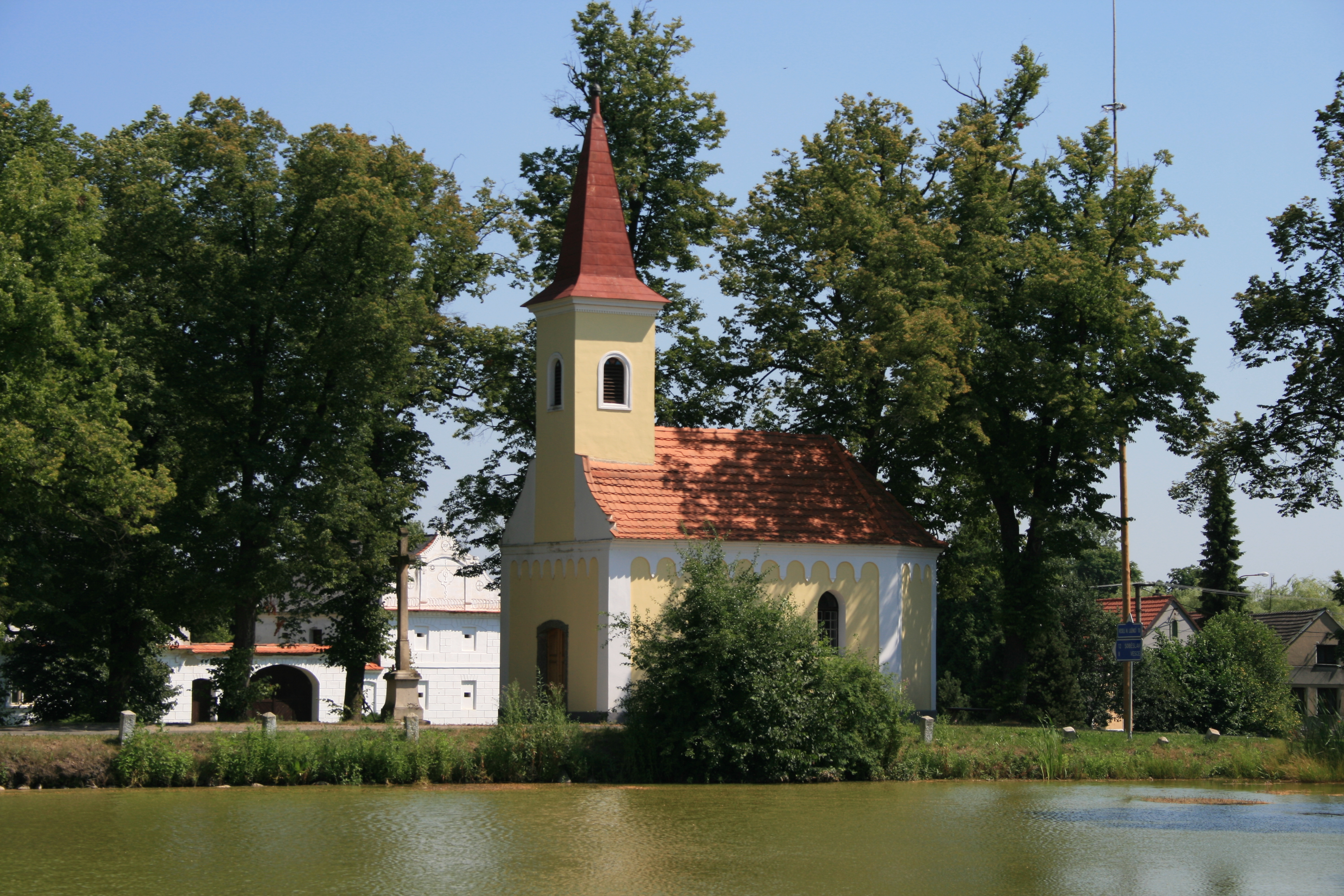
- Chapel of Saint Anne

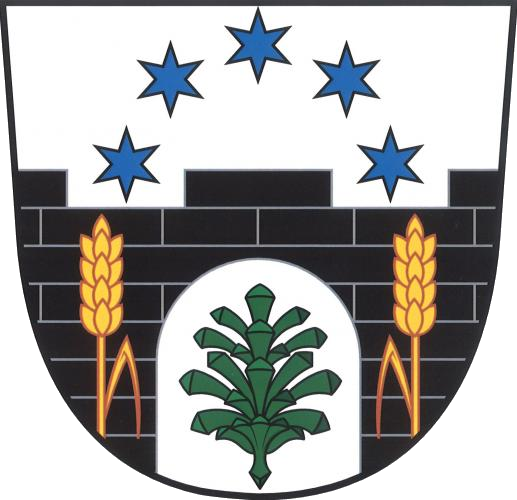
- Flag Coat of arms

- Location in the Czech Republic
- Coordinates: 49°12′49″N 14°36′46″E
- Country: Czech Republic
- Region: South Bohemian
- District: Tábor
- First mentioned: 1354

Area
  - Total: 5.52 km^{2} (2.13 sq mi)
- Elevation: 419 m (1,375 ft)

Population (2026-01-01)
  - Total: 146
  - Density: 26.4/km^{2} (68.5/sq mi)
- Time zone: UTC+1 (CET)
  - Summer (DST): UTC+2 (CEST)
- Postal code: 391 81
- Website: www.mazice.cz

Mažice (German: Maschitz) is a municipality and village in Tábor District in the South Bohemian Region of the Czech Republic. It has about 100 inhabitants. The historic centre of the village is well preserved and is protected as a village monument reservation.

Mažice lies approximately 23 kilometres (14 mi) south of Tábor, 29 km (18 mi) north of České Budějovice, and 99 km (62 mi) south of Prague.

== Demographics ==
Historical population
Year	Pop.	±%
1869	427	—
1880	456	+6.8%
1890	439	−3.7%
1900	427	−2.7%
1910	437	+2.3%
1921	383	−12.4%
1930	384	+0.3%
1950	311	−19.0%
1961	273	−12.2%
1970	265	−2.9%
1980	188	−29.1%
1991	169	−10.1%
2001	141	−16.6%
2011	122	−13.5%
2021	126	+3.3%
Source: Censuses
