= Nová Ves =

Nová Ves may refer to places:

== Czech Republic ==
=== Municipalities ===
- Nová Ves (Brno-Country District) in the South Moravian Region
- Nová Ves (České Budějovice District) in the South Bohemian Region
- Nová Ves (Český Krumlov District) in the South Bohemian Region
- Nová Ves (Domažlice District) in the Plzeň Region
- Nová Ves (Liberec District) in the Liberec Region
- Nová Ves (Louny District) in the Ústí nad Labem Region
- Nová Ves (Mělník District) in the Central Bohemian Region
- Nová Ves (Plzeň-South District) in the Plzeň Region
- Nová Ves (Prague-East District) in the Central Bohemian Region
- Nová Ves (Rychnov nad Kněžnou District) in the Hradec Králové Region
- Nová Ves (Sokolov District) in the Karlovy Vary Region
- Nová Ves (Strakonice District) in the South Bohemian Region
- Nová Ves (Třebíč District) in the Vysočina Region
- Nová Ves (Žďár nad Sázavou District) in the Vysočina Region
- Nová Ves I in the Central Bohemian Region
- Nová Ves nad Lužnicí in the South Bohemian Region
- Nová Ves nad Nisou in the Liberec Region
- Nová Ves nad Popelkou in the Liberec Region
- Nová Ves pod Pleší in the Central Bohemian Region
- Nová Ves u Bakova in the Central Bohemian Region
- Nová Ves u Chotěboře in the Vysočina Region
- Nová Ves u Chýnova in the South Bohemian Region
- Nová Ves u Jarošova in the Pardubice Region
- Nová Ves u Leštiny in the Vysočina Region
- Nová Ves u Mladé Vožice in the South Bohemian Region
- Nová Ves u Nového Města na Moravě in the Vysočina Region
- Nová Ves u Světlé in the Vysočina Region
- Nová Ves v Horách in the Ústí nad Labem Region
- Hradec-Nová Ves in the Olomouc Region
- Kuřimská Nová Ves in the South Moravian Region
- Moravská Nová Ves, a market town in the South Moravian Region
- Ostrožská Nová Ves in the Zlín Region
- Tišnovská Nová Ves in the South Moravian Region

=== Municipal parts ===
- Nová Ves, a part of Batelov in the Vysočina Region
- Nová Ves, a part of Božejov in the Vysočina Region
- Nová Ves, a part of Branžež in the Central Bohemian Region
- Nová Ves, a part of Český Rudolec in the South Bohemian Region
- Nová Ves, a part of Choceň in the Pardubice Region
- Nová Ves, a part of Chotěšice in the Central Bohemian Region
- Nová Ves, a part of Chyšky in the South Bohemian Region
- Nová Ves, a part of Číměř (Jindřichův Hradec District) in the South Bohemian Region
- Nová Ves, a part of Čistá (Rakovník District) in the Central Bohemian Region
- Nová Ves, a part of Čížová in the South Bohemian Region
- Nová Ves, a part of Děkov in the Central Bohemian Region
- Nová Ves, a part of Dírná in the South Bohemian Region
- Nová Ves, a part of Dolní Moravice in the Moravian-Silesian Region
- Nová Ves, a part of Důl in the Vysočina Region
- Nová Ves, a part of Frýdlant nad Ostravicí in the Moravian-Silesian Region
- Nová Ves, a part of Hodětín in the South Bohemian Region
- Nová Ves, a part of Hora Svatého Šebestiána in the Ústí nad Labem Region
- Nová Ves, a part of Horšovský Týn in the Plzeň Region
- Nová Ves, a part of Hradečno in the Central Bohemian Region
- Nová Ves, a part of Kamenice nad Lipou in the Vysočina Region
- Nová Ves, a part of Kbel (Plzeň-South District) in the Plzeň Region
- Nová Ves, a part of Kocbeře in the Hradec Králové Region
- Nová Ves, a part of Konstantinovy Lázně in the Plzeň Region
- Nová Ves, a part of Košetice in the Vysočina Region
- Nová Ves, a part of Křižovatka in the Karlovy Vary Region
- Nová Ves, a part of Kunčina in the Pardubice Region
- Nová Ves, a part of Lešany (Benešov District) in the Central Bohemian Region
- Nová Ves, a part of Litovel in the Olomouc Region
- Nová Ves, a part of Malá Morava in the Olomouc Region
- Nová Ves, a part of Miloňovice in the South Bohemian Region
- Nová Ves, a part of Nalžovice in the Central Bohemian Region
- Nová Ves, a part of Nasavrky in the Pardubice Region
- Nová Ves, a part of Nepomyšl in the Ústí nad Labem Region
- Nová Ves, a part of Olešník in the South Bohemian Region
- Nová Ves, a part of Oselce in the Plzeň Region
- Nová Ves (Ostrava), a borough of Ostrava in the Moravian-Silesian Region
- Nová Ves, a part of Pohořelice in the South Moravian Region
- Nová Ves, a part of Postupice in the Central Bohemian Region
- Nová Ves, a part of Pyšely in the Central Bohemian Region
- Nová Ves, a part of Skuhrov nad Bělou in the Hradec Králové Region
- Nová Ves, a part of Skuteč in the Pardubice Region
- Nová Ves, a part of Slabce in the Central Bohemian Region
- Nová Ves, a part of Staňkovice (Kutná Hora District) in the Central Bohemian Region
- Nová Ves, a part of Teplice in the Ústí nad Labem Region
- Nová Ves, a part of Třemešné in the Plzeň Region
- Nová Ves, a part of Voděrady (Rychnov nad Kněžnou District) in the Hradec Králové Region
- Nová Ves, a part of Volfartice in the Liberec Region
- Nová Ves, a part of Zaječov in the Central Bohemian Region
- Nová Ves, a part of Zámrsk in the Pardubice Region
- Nová Ves II, a part of Rostoklaty in the Central Bohemian Region
- Nová Ves III, a part of Svojšice (Kolín District) in the Central Bohemian Region
- Děčín XX-Nová Ves, a part of Děčín in the Ústí nad Labem

== Slovakia ==
- Nová Ves, Veľký Krtíš District, a municipality and village in the Banská Bystrica Region
- Nová Ves nad Váhom, a municipality and village in the Trenčín Region
- Nová Ves nad Žitavou, a municipality and village in the Nitra Region
- Chminianska Nová Ves, a municipality and village in the Prešov Region
- Devínska Nová Ves, a borough of Bratislava
- Diviacka Nová Ves, a municipality and village in the Trenčín Region
- Drienovská Nová Ves, a municipality and village in the Prešov Region
- Hajná Nová Ves, a municipality and village in the Nitra Region
- Klátova Nová Ves, a municipality and village in the Trenčín Region
- Košická Nová Ves, a borough of Košice
- Lakšárska Nová Ves, a municipality and village in the Trnava Region
- Opatovská Nová Ves, a municipality and village in the Banská Bystrica Region
- Pečovská Nová Ves, a municipality and village in the Prešov Region
- Ruská Nová Ves, a municipality and village in the Prešov Region
- Slovenská Nová Ves, a municipality and village in the Trnava Region
- Spišská Nová Ves, a municipality and village in the Košice Region
- Turnianska Nová Ves, a municipality and village in the Košice Region
- Tušická Nová Ves, a municipality and village in the Košice Region
- Zemplínska Nová Ves, a municipality and village in the Košice Region
