= VES =

VES may refer to:

== Society ==
- Venezuelan bolívar soberano (ISO 4217 code VES), the currency of Venezuela beginning in 2018

== Science and technology ==
- Video Entertainment System, second generation video games console
- Vertical electrical sounding, geophysical investigation technique
- Virtual Execution System

=== Biology and medicine ===
- Ventricular extrasystole, a type of premature heart beat

== Organisations ==
=== Educational ===
- Virginia Episcopal School, Lynchburg, Virginia, United States
- Vivekananda Educational Society, Chennai, Tamil Nadu, India

=== Other ===
- Voluntary Euthanasia Society, former name of Dignity in Dying
- Vieques Air Link (ICAO Code: VES)
- Visual Effects Society

== See also ==
- Nová Ves (disambiguation)
- VE (disambiguation)
