= Drienovská Nová Ves =

Village and municipality in Prešov District in Slovakia

- Municipality
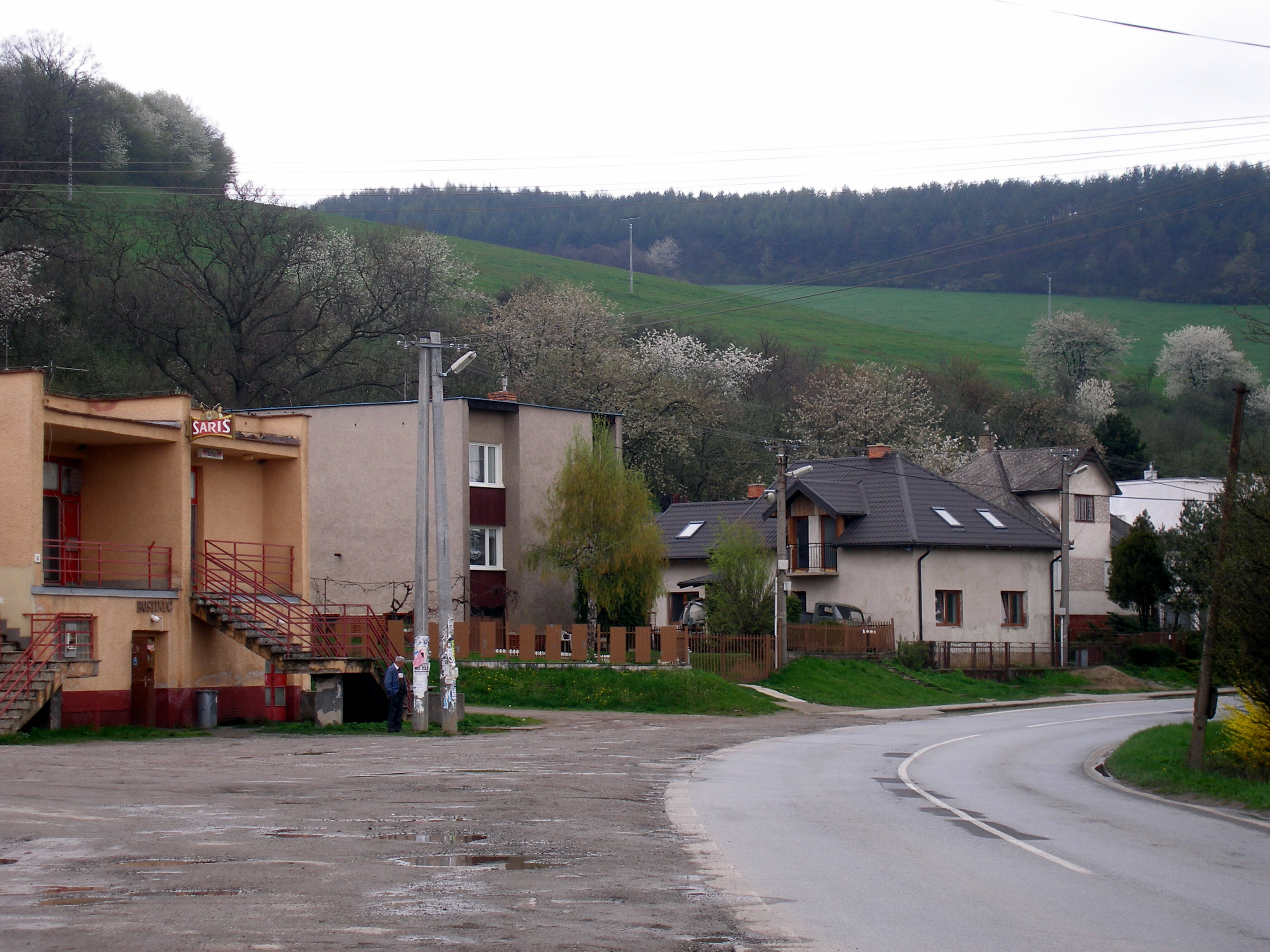

- Flag

- Location of Drienovská Nová Ves in the Prešov Region Location of Drienovská Nová Ves in Slovakia
- Coordinates: 48.90°N 21.25°E
- Country: Slovakia
- Region: Prešov Region
- District: Prešov District
- First mentioned: 1335

Area
  - Total: 6.48 km^{2} (2.50 sq mi)
- Elevation: 225 m (738 ft)

Population (2025)
  - Total: 922
- Time zone: UTC+1 (CET)
  - Summer (DST): UTC+2 (CEST)
- Postal code: 820 2
- Area code: +421 51
- Vehicle registration plate (until 2022): PO
- Website: www.drienovskanovaves.sk

Drienovská Nová Ves (Hungarian: Somosújfalu) is a village and municipality in Prešov District in the Prešov Region of eastern Slovakia.

== History ==
In historical records the village was first mentioned in 1335.

== Geography ==
The municipality lies at an altitude of 225 metres (738 ft) and covers an area of 6.48 km^{2} (2.50 sq mi) (2025).

== Population ==
Population statistic (10 years)
Year	1995	2005	2015	2025
Count	623	706	817	922
Difference		+13.32%	+15.72%	+12.85%

Population statistic
Year	2024	2025
Count	897	922
Difference		+2.78%

It has a population of 922 people (31 December 2025).

=== Ethnicity ===
Census 2021 (1+ %)
Ethnicity	Number	Fraction
Slovak	754	93.66%
Romani	137	17.01%
Not found out	24	2.98%
Total	805	

In year 2021 was 805 people by ethnicity 754 as Slovak, 137 as Romani, 24 as Not found out, 5 as Other, 4 as Hungarian, 2 as Czech, 2 as Rusyn, 2 as German, 1 as Jewish, 1 as Ukrainian, 1 as Italian and 1 as Silesian.

Note on population: The difference values of population numbers in the table "Population statistic" and in the sections "Ethnicity" & "Religion" is caused by the use of various statistical methods.

=== Religion ===
Census 2021 (1+ %)
Religion	Number	Fraction
Roman Catholic Church	569	70.68%
Evangelical Church	102	12.67%
None	79	9.81%
Not found out	21	2.61%
Greek Catholic Church	18	2.24%
Total	805	

In year 2021 was 805 people by religion 569 from Roman Catholic Church, 102 from Evangelical Church, 79 from None, 21 from Not found out, 18 from Greek Catholic Church, 5 from Old Catholic Church, 4 from Apostolic Church, 2 from Eastern Orthodox Church, 1 from Other, 1 from United Methodist Church, 1 from Church of Jesus Christ of Latter-day Saints, 1 from Buddhism and 1 from Ad hoc movements.

== Genealogical resources ==
The records for genealogical research are available at the state archive "Statny Archiv in Kosice, Presov, Slovakia"

- Roman Catholic church records (births/marriages/deaths): 1789–1895 (parish B)
- Greek Catholic church records (births/marriages/deaths): 1812–1904 (parish B)
- Lutheran church records (births/marriages/deaths): 1787–1895 (parish B)

== See also ==
- List of municipalities and towns in Slovakia
