= Chotěšice =

- Municipality
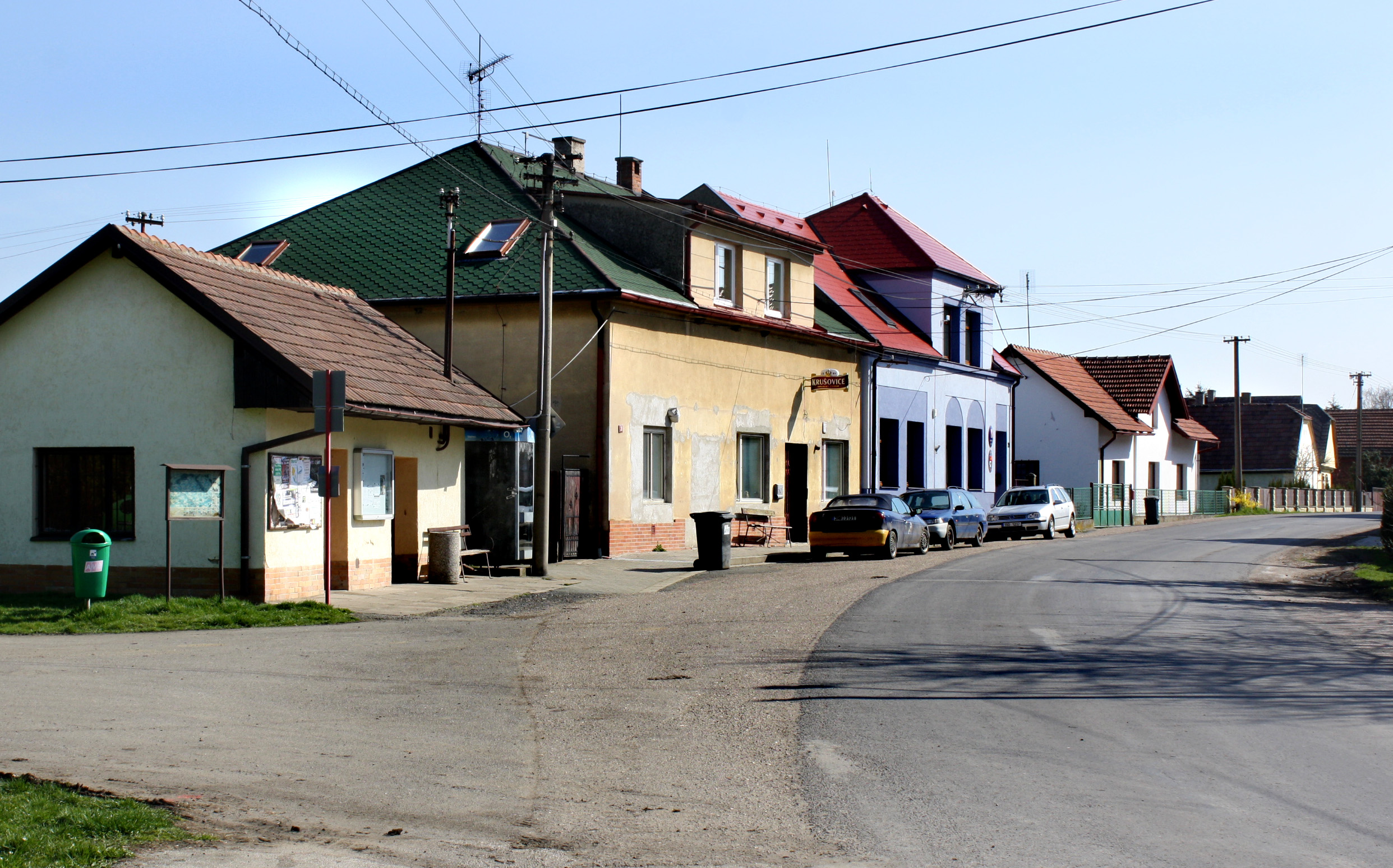
- Main street

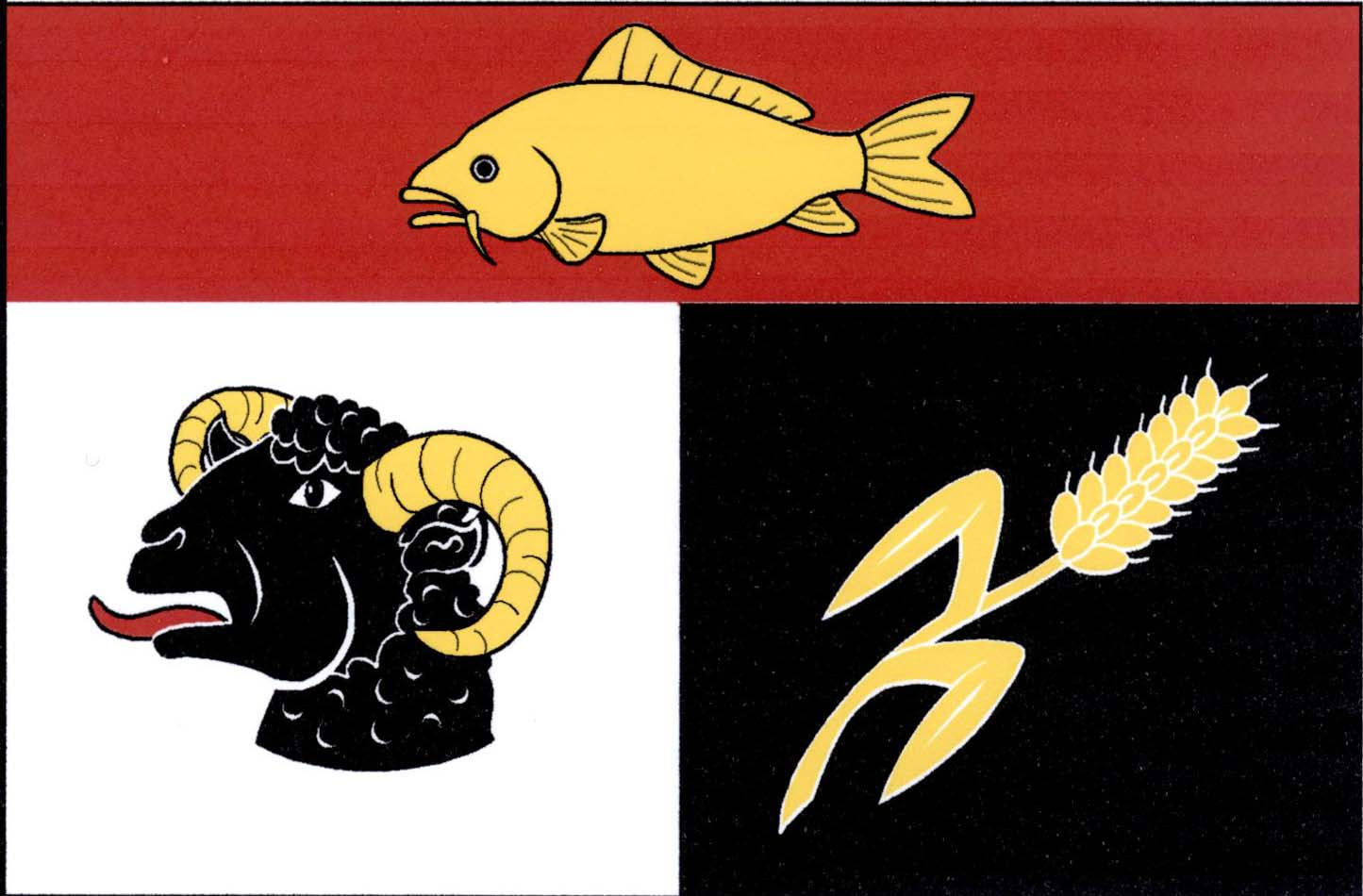
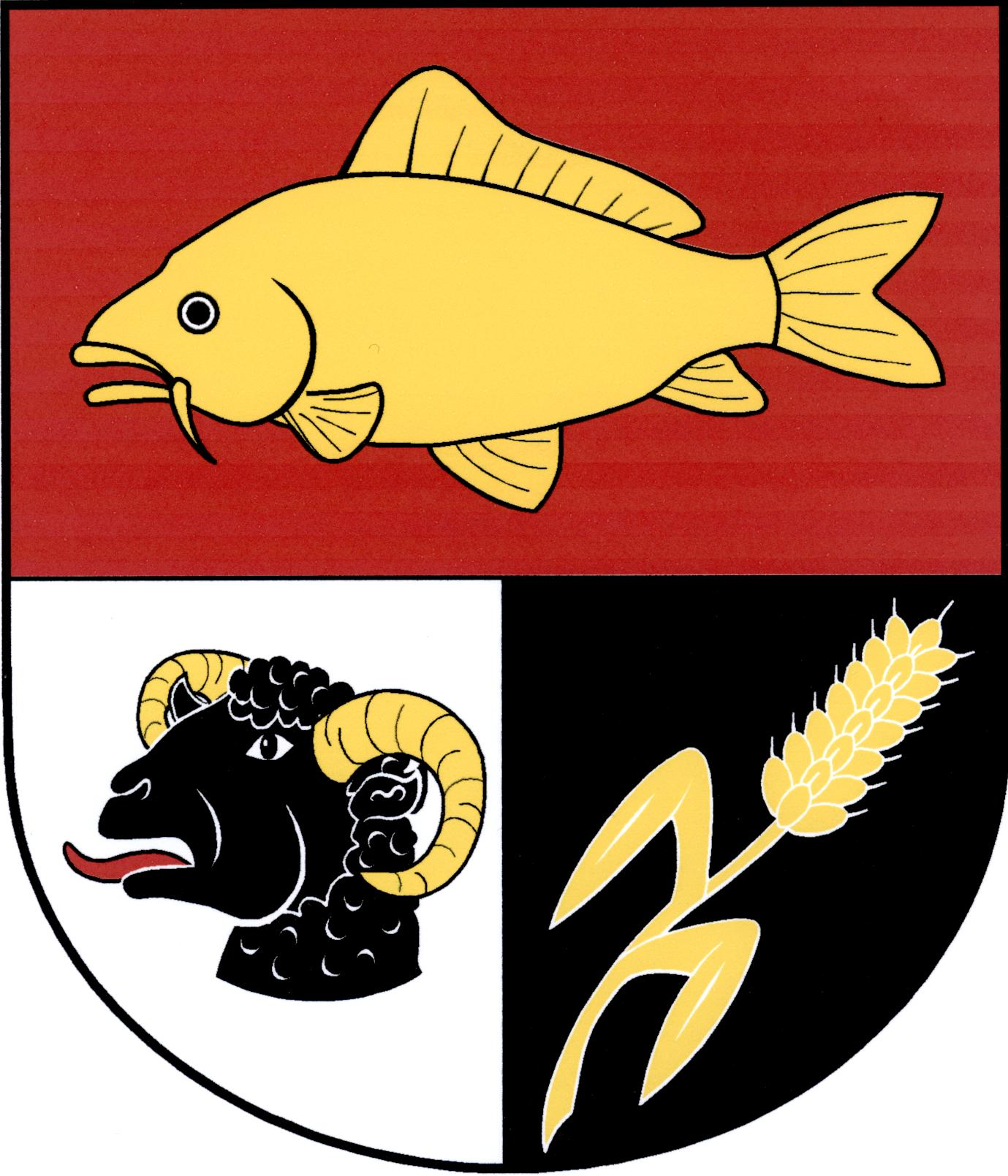
- Flag Coat of arms

- Location in the Czech Republic
- Coordinates: 50°16′43″N 15°16′23″E
- Country: Czech Republic
- Region: Central Bohemian
- District: Nymburk
- First mentioned: 1199

Area
  - Total: 22.51 km^{2} (8.69 sq mi)
- Elevation: 213 m (699 ft)

Population (2026-01-01)
  - Total: 321
  - Density: 14.3/km^{2} (36.9/sq mi)
- Time zone: UTC+1 (CET)
  - Summer (DST): UTC+2 (CEST)
- Postal code: 289 01
- Website: www.chotesice.cz

Chotěšice is a municipality and village in Nymburk District in the Central Bohemian Region of the Czech Republic. It has about 300 inhabitants.

== Administrative division ==
Chotěšice consists of five municipal parts (in brackets population according to the 2021 census):

- Chotěšice (181)
- Břístev (34)
- Malá Strana (22)
- Nouzov (87)
- Nová Ves (21)

== Etymology ==
The name is derived from the personal name Chotěš, meaning "the village of Chotěš's people".

== Geography ==
Chotěšice is located about 19 kilometres (12 mi) northeast of Nymburk and 53 kilometres (33 mi) northeast of Prague. It lies in the Central Elbe Table. The stream Smíchovský potok flows through the municipality.

== History ==
The first written mention of Chotěšice is in a deed of King Ottokar I from 1199.

== Demographics ==
Historical population

Year	Pop.	±%
1869	1,381	—
1880	1,582	+14.6%
1890	1,515	−4.2%
1900	1,504	−0.7%
1910	1,554	+3.3%

Year	Pop.	±%
1921	1,442	−7.2%
1930	1,368	−5.1%
1950	974	−28.8%
1961	844	−13.3%
1970	653	−22.6%

Year	Pop.	±%
1980	497	−23.9%
1991	378	−23.9%
2001	315	−16.7%
2011	322	+2.2%
2021	345	+7.1%

Source: Censuses

== Transport ==
The I/32 road, which connects the D11 motorway with Jičín, runs through the municipality.

== Sights ==
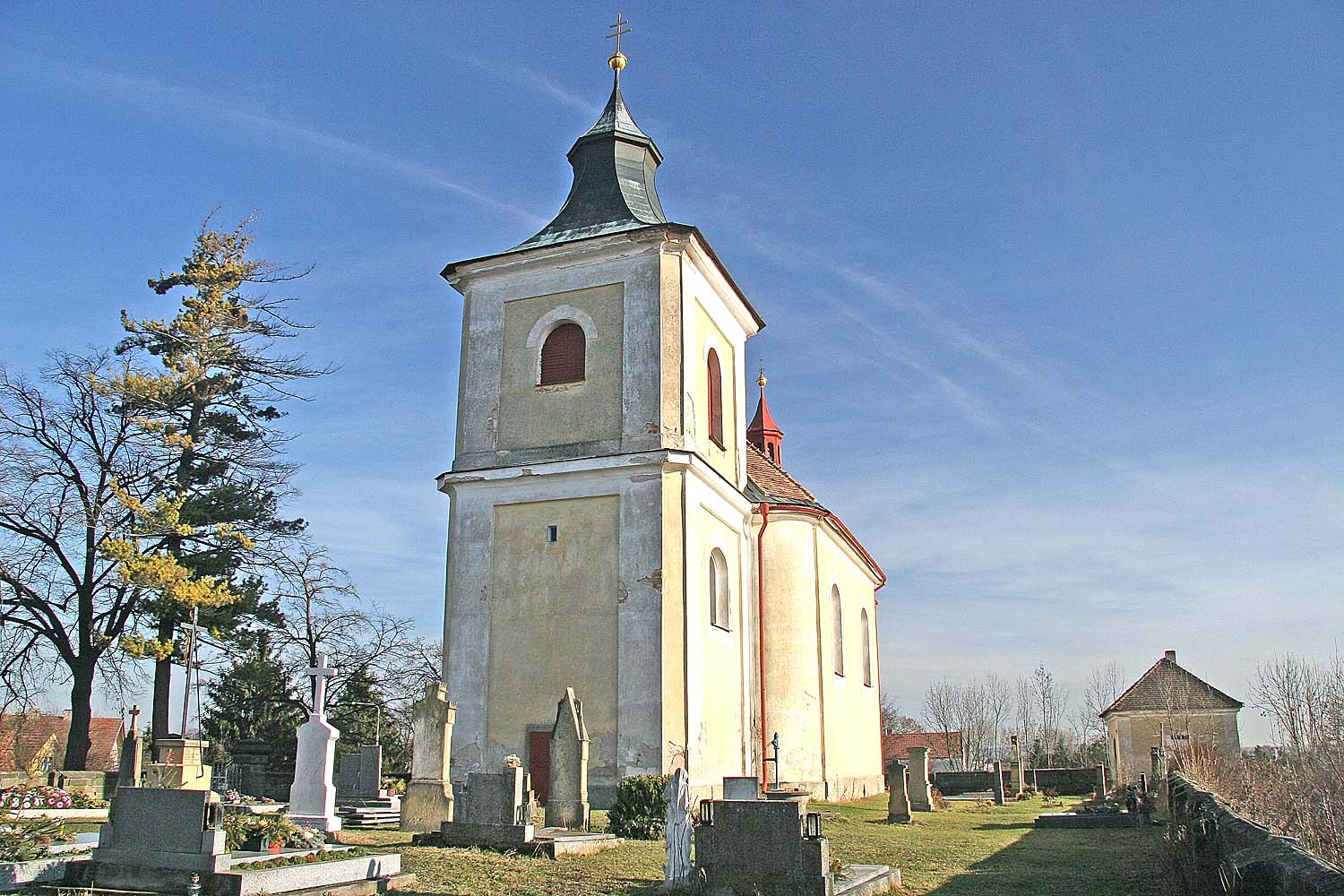
Church of the Sending of the Holy Apostles

The main landmark of Chotěšice is the Church of the Sending of the Holy Apostles. It was first mentioned in the 14th century and rebuilt in the Renaissance style in 1599.
