= Nová Ves u Mladé Vožice =

- Municipality
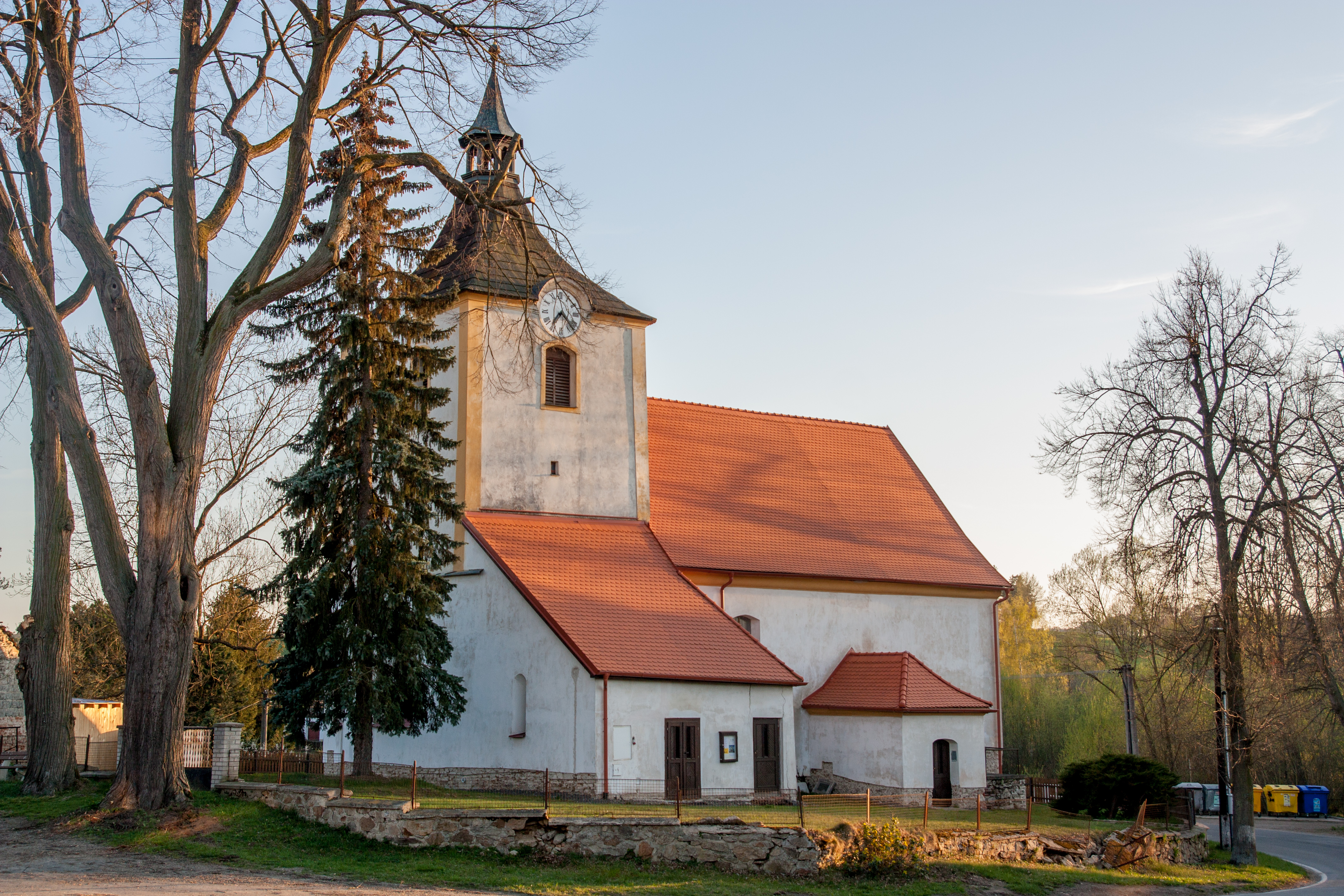
- Church of Saint Catherine

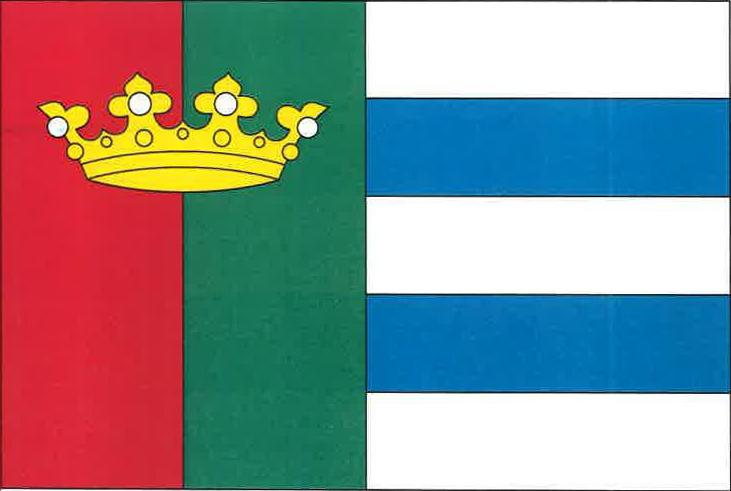
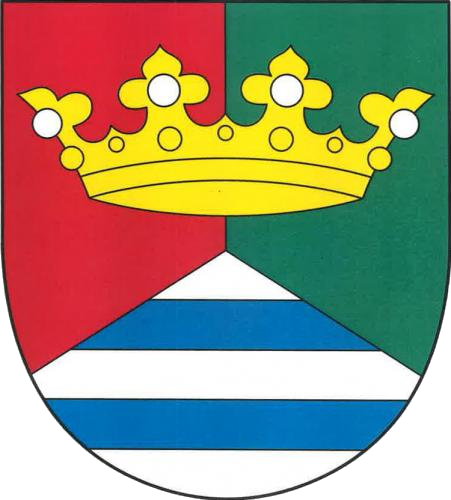
- Flag Coat of arms

- Location in the Czech Republic
- Coordinates: 49°32′35″N 14°44′53″E
- Country: Czech Republic
- Region: South Bohemian
- District: Tábor
- First mentioned: 1257

Area
  - Total: 11.74 km^{2} (4.53 sq mi)
- Elevation: 465 m (1,526 ft)

Population (2026-01-01)
  - Total: 203
  - Density: 17.3/km^{2} (44.8/sq mi)
- Time zone: UTC+1 (CET)
  - Summer (DST): UTC+2 (CEST)
- Postal code: 391 43
- Website: www.obec-nova-ves.cz

Nová Ves u Mladé Vožice is a municipality and village in Tábor District in the South Bohemian Region of the Czech Republic. It has about 200 inhabitants.

Nová Ves u Mladé Vožice lies approximately 16 kilometres (10 mi) north-east of Tábor, 66 km (41 mi) north of České Budějovice, and 65 km (40 mi) south of Prague.

== Administrative division ==
Nová Ves u Mladé Vožice consists of four municipal parts (in brackets population according to the 2021 census):

- Nová Ves u Mladé Vožice (51)
- Horní Střítež (85)
- Křtěnovice (17)
- Mutice (46)

== Demographics ==
Historical population
Year	Pop.	±%
1869	823	—
1880	871	+5.8%
1890	796	−8.6%
1900	800	+0.5%
1910	767	−4.1%
1921	703	−8.3%
1930	644	−8.4%
1950	444	−31.1%
1961	416	−6.3%
1970	354	−14.9%
1980	281	−20.6%
1991	199	−29.2%
2001	189	−5.0%
2011	164	−13.2%
2021	199	+21.3%
Source: Censuses
