= Nová Ves (Brno-Country District) =

- Municipality
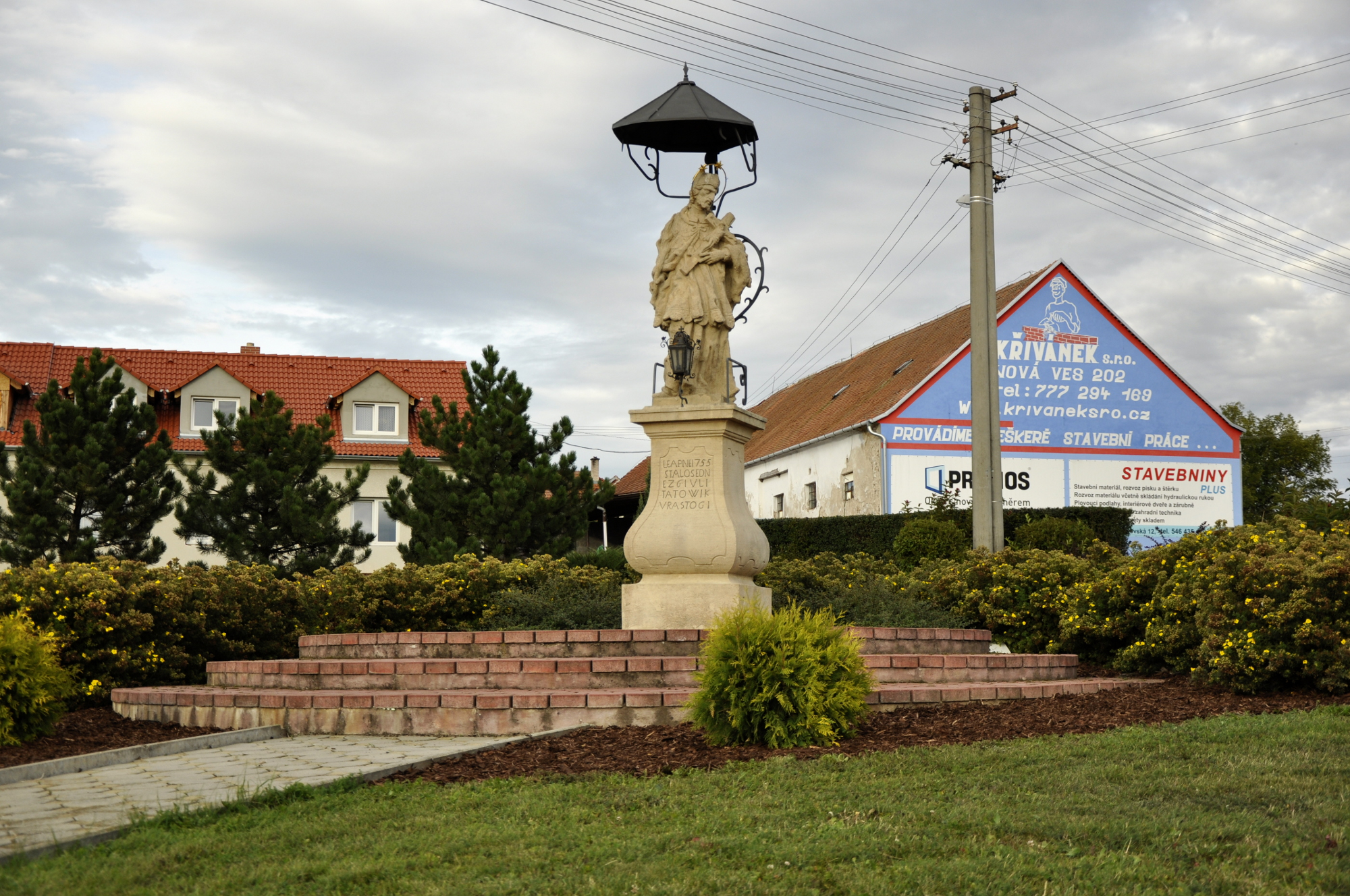
- Common with statue of Saint John of Nepomuk

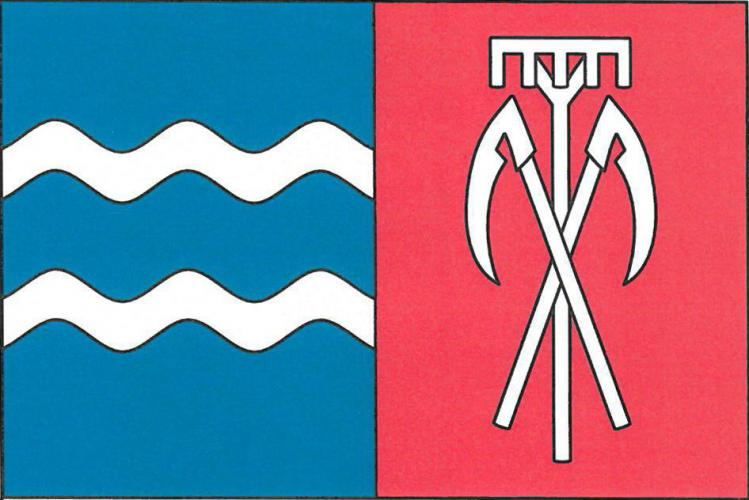
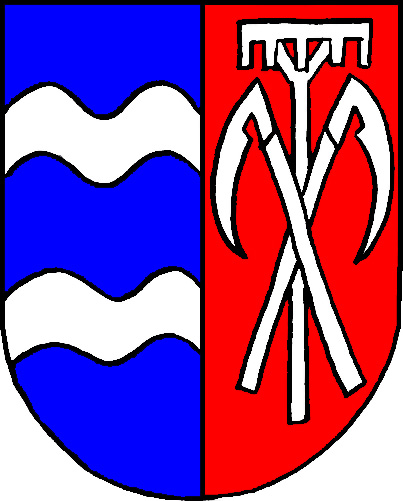
- Flag Coat of arms

- Location in the Czech Republic
- Coordinates: 49°6′29″N 16°18′39″E
- Country: Czech Republic
- Region: South Moravian
- District: Brno-Country
- First mentioned: 1547

Area
  - Total: 11.60 km^{2} (4.48 sq mi)
- Elevation: 278 m (912 ft)

Population (2026-01-01)
  - Total: 847
  - Density: 73.0/km^{2} (189/sq mi)
- Time zone: UTC+1 (CET)
  - Summer (DST): UTC+2 (CEST)
- Postal codes: 664 13
- Website: novaves-bv.cz

Nová Ves is a municipality and village in Brno-Country District in the South Moravian Region of the Czech Republic. It has about 800 inhabitants.

== Etymology ==
The name means 'new village' in Czech.

== Geography ==
Nová Ves is located about 22 kilometres (14 mi) southwest of Brno. It lies on the border between the Jevišovice Uplands and Boskovice Furrow. The highest point is a nameless hill at 381 m (1,250 ft) above sea level. The Oslava River flows along the northern municipal border and the Jihlava River flows along the southern municipal border.

== Demographics ==
Historical population

| Year | Pop. | ±% |
|---|---|---|
| 1869 | 556 | — |
| 1880 | 597 | +7.4% |
| 1890 | 664 | +11.2% |
| 1900 | 684 | +3.0% |
| 1910 | 730 | +6.7% |

| Year | Pop. | ±% |
|---|---|---|
| 1921 | 793 | +8.6% |
| 1930 | 881 | +11.1% |
| 1950 | 855 | −3.0% |
| 1961 | 884 | +3.4% |
| 1970 | 824 | −6.8% |

| Year | Pop. | ±% |
|---|---|---|
| 1980 | 737 | −10.6% |
| 1991 | 720 | −2.3% |
| 2001 | 706 | −1.9% |
| 2011 | 752 | +6.5% |
| 2021 | 788 | +4.8% |

Source: Censuses

== Transport ==
There are no railways or major roads passing through the municipality.

== Sights ==
Protected cultural monuments in the municipality include a late Baroque statue of Saint John of Nepomuk from 1755, five stone crosses, two column shrines, and fragments of the Rysov Castle that stood here from the end of the 13th century to the mid-14th century.
