= Kunčina =

- Municipality
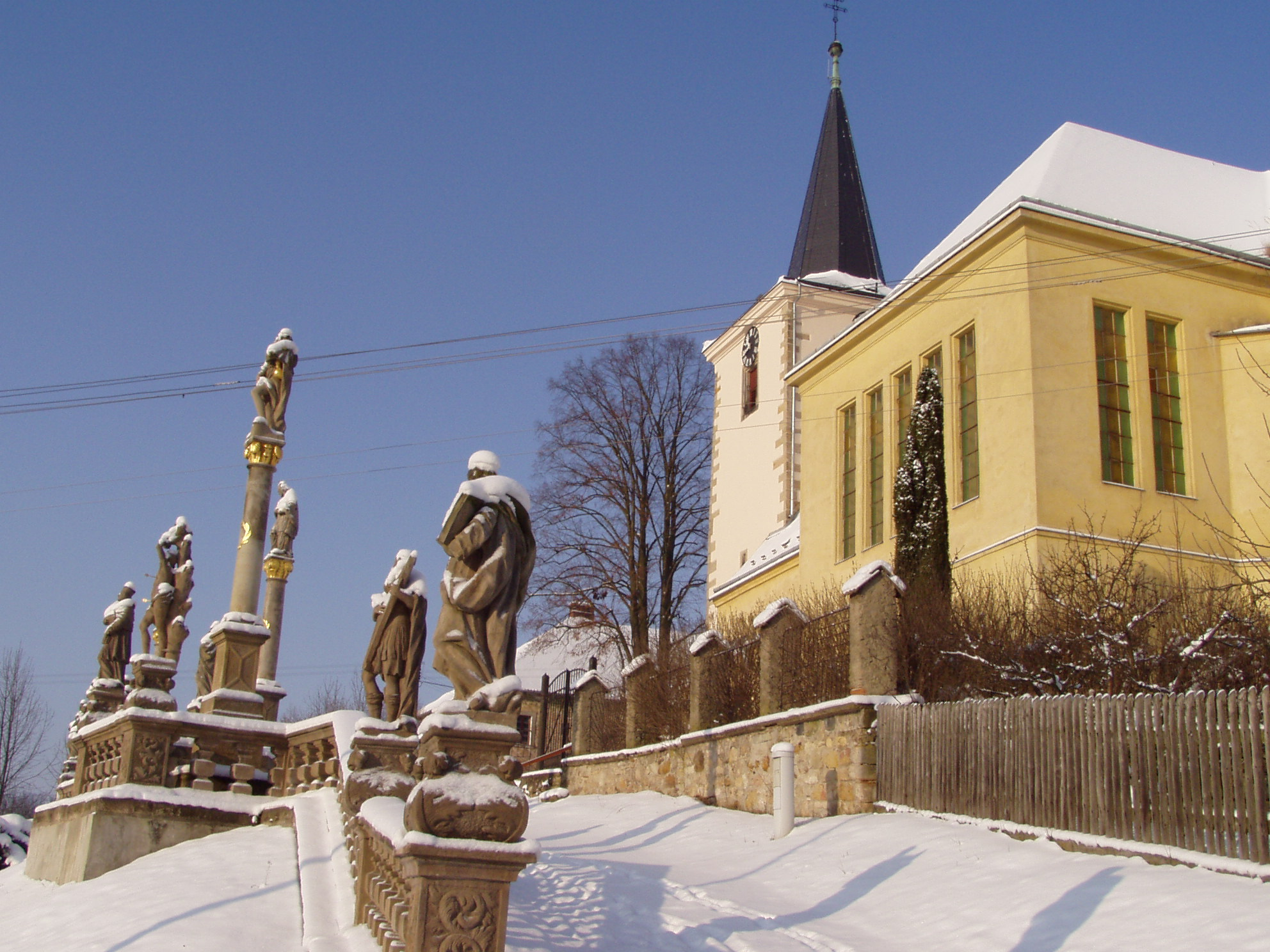
- Church of Saint George

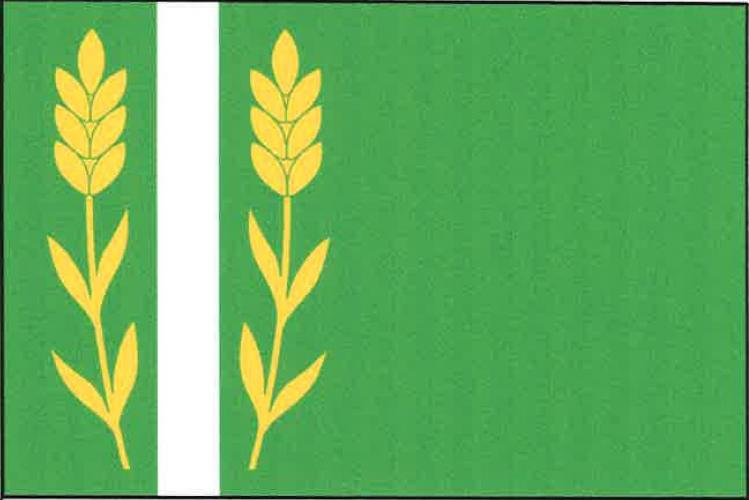
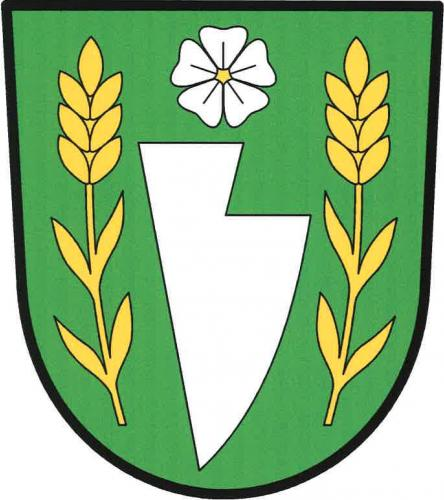
- Flag Coat of arms

- Location in the Czech Republic
- Coordinates: 49°47′40″N 16°37′40″E
- Country: Czech Republic
- Region: Pardubice
- District: Svitavy
- First mentioned: 1270

Area
  - Total: 22.66 km^{2} (8.75 sq mi)
- Elevation: 365 m (1,198 ft)

Population (2026-01-01)
  - Total: 1,398
  - Density: 61.69/km^{2} (159.8/sq mi)
- Time zone: UTC+1 (CET)
  - Summer (DST): UTC+2 (CEST)
- Postal code: 569 24
- Website: www.obeckuncina.cz

Kunčina is a municipality and village in Svitavy District in the Pardubice Region of the Czech Republic. It has about 1,400 inhabitants.

Kunčina lies approximately 13 kilometres (8 mi) east of Svitavy, 67 km (42 mi) south-east of Pardubice, and 162 km (101 mi) east of Prague.

== Administrative division ==
Kunčina consists of two municipal parts (in brackets population according to the 2021 census):

- Kunčina (929)
- Nová Ves (369)

== Demographics ==
Historical population
Year	Pop.	±%
1869	2,002	—
1880	2,052	+2.5%
1890	2,018	−1.7%
1900	1,958	−3.0%
1910	1,836	−6.2%
1921	1,802	−1.9%
1930	1,925	+6.8%
1950	1,278	−33.6%
1961	1,374	+7.5%
1970	1,278	−7.0%
1980	1,248	−2.3%
1991	1,153	−7.6%
2001	1,174	+1.8%
2011	1,276	+8.7%
2021	1,298	+1.7%
Source: Censuses
