= Svojšice (Kolín District) =

- Municipality
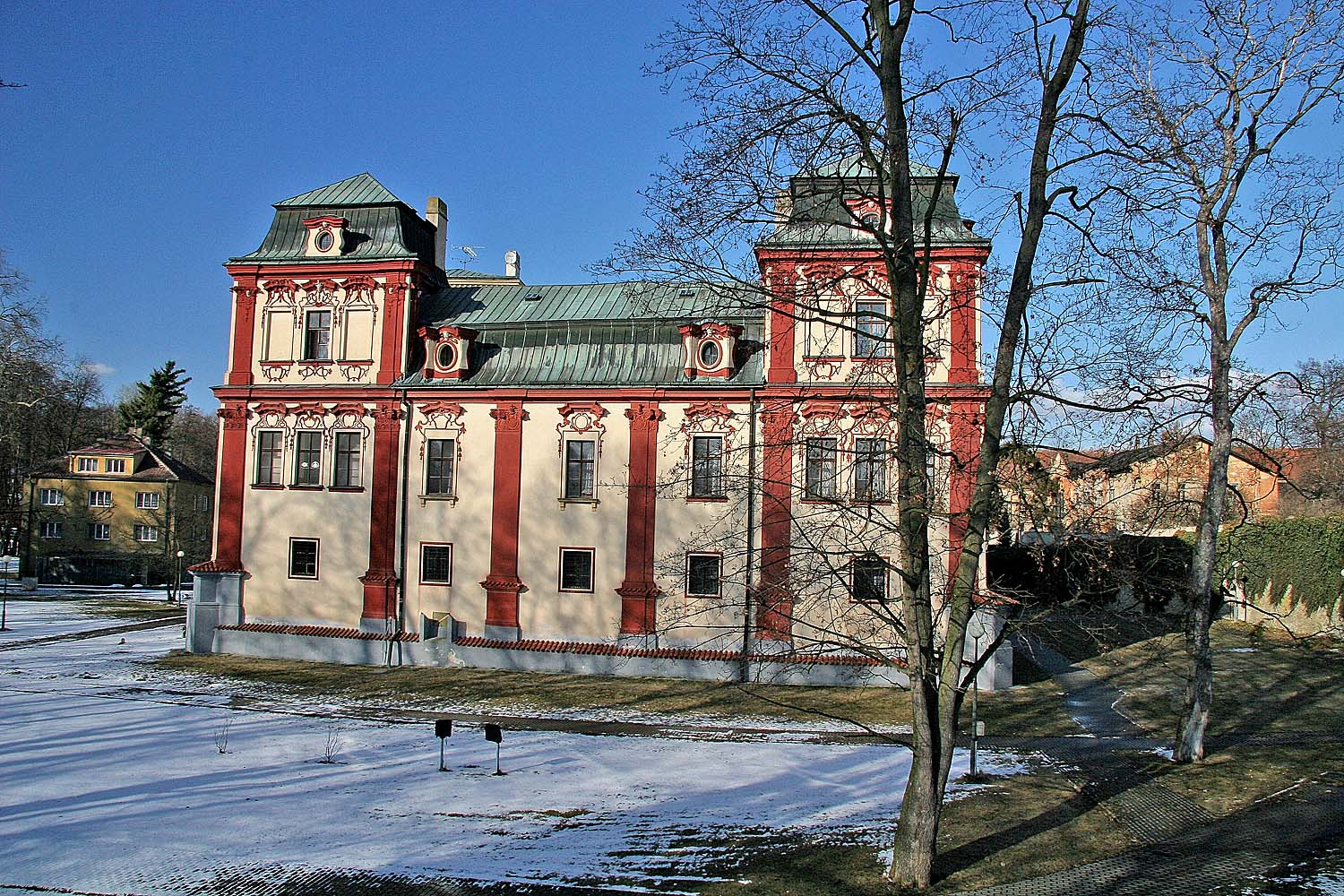
- Svojšice Castle

- Location in the Czech Republic
- Coordinates: 50°0′10″N 15°2′30″E
- Country: Czech Republic
- Region: Central Bohemian
- District: Kolín
- First mentioned: 1241

Area
  - Total: 9.83 km^{2} (3.80 sq mi)
- Elevation: 275 m (902 ft)

Population (2026-01-01)
  - Total: 532
  - Density: 54.1/km^{2} (140/sq mi)
- Time zone: UTC+1 (CET)
  - Summer (DST): UTC+2 (CEST)
- Postal codes: 280 02, 281 07, 281 63
- Website: www.svojsiceukolina.cz

Svojšice is a municipality and village in Kolín District in the Central Bohemian Region of the Czech Republic. It has about 500 inhabitants.

== Administrative division ==
Svojšice consists of three municipal parts (in brackets population according to the 2021 census):

- Svojšice (316)
- Bošice (128)
- Nová Ves III (66)

== Demographics ==
Historical population
Year	Pop.	±%
1869	1,091	—
1880	1,169	+7.1%
1890	1,303	+11.5%
1900	1,275	−2.1%
1910	1,180	−7.5%
1921	1,121	−5.0%
1930	1,089	−2.9%
1950	819	−24.8%
1961	914	+11.6%
1970	873	−4.5%
1980	708	−18.9%
1991	604	−14.7%
2001	518	−14.2%
2011	584	+12.7%
2021	510	−12.7%
Source: Censuses
