= Nová Ves, Veľký Krtíš District =

Nová Ves Kürtösújfalu
- Municipality
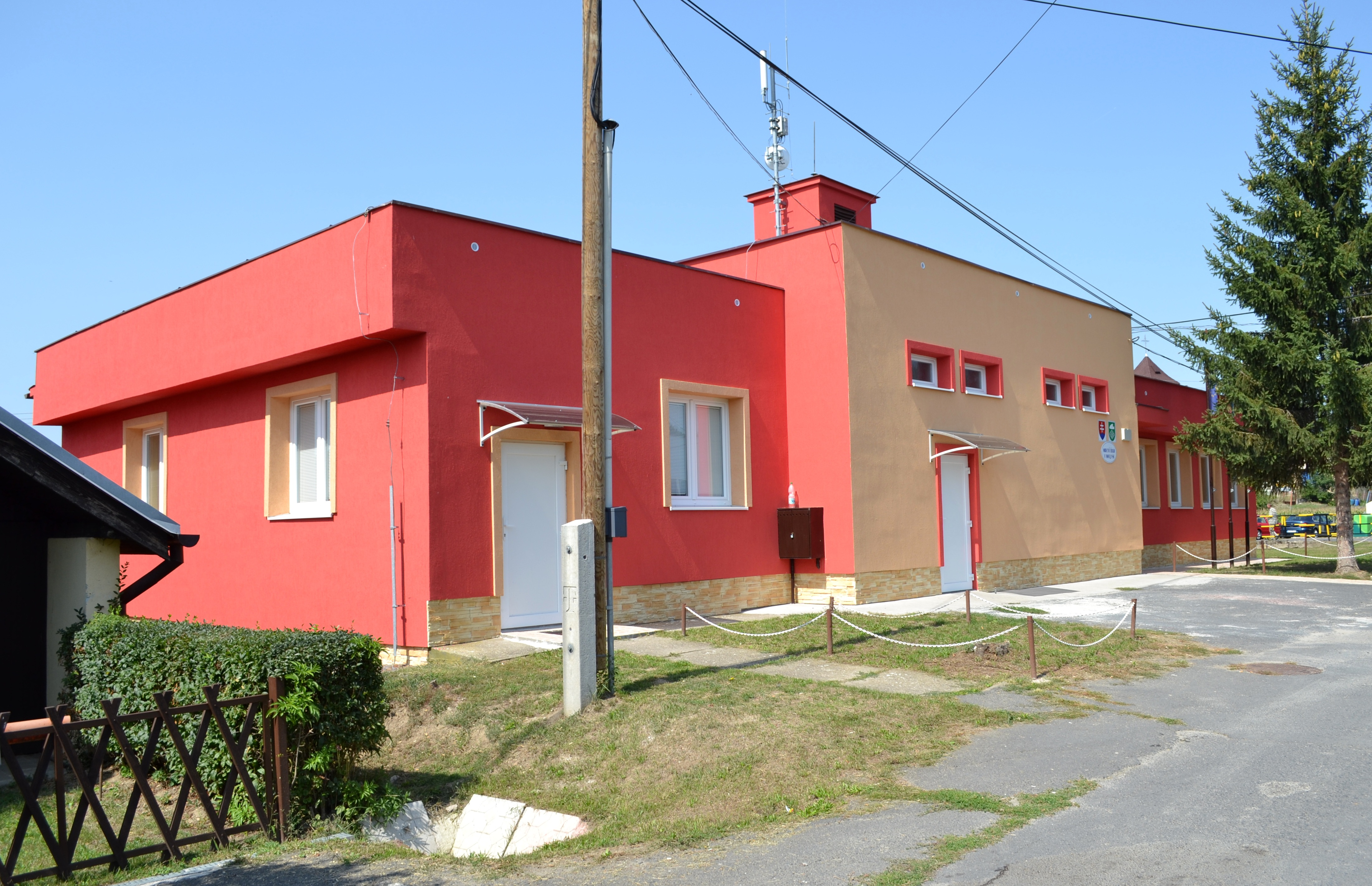
- Municipal office

- Flag

- Location of Nová Ves in the Banská Bystrica Region Location of Nová Ves in Slovakia
- Coordinates: 48.17°N 19.37°E
- Country: Slovakia
- Region: Banská Bystrica Region
- District: Veľký Krtíš District
- First mentioned: 1473

Area
  - Total: 8.50 km^{2} (3.28 sq mi)
- Elevation: 164 m (538 ft)

Population (2025)
  - Total: 468
- Time zone: UTC+1 (CET)
  - Summer (DST): UTC+2 (CEST)
- Postal code: 991 05
- Area code: +421 47
- Vehicle registration plate (until 2022): VK
- Website: www.obecnovaves.sk

Nová Ves (Hungarian: Kürtösújfalu) is a village and municipality in the Veľký Krtíš District of the Banská Bystrica Region of southern Slovakia.

== Population ==
Population statistic (10 years)
Year	1995	2005	2015	2025
Count	345	373	406	468
Difference		+8.11%	+8.84%	+15.27%

Population statistic
Year	2024	2025
Count	466	468
Difference		+0.42%

It has a population of 468 people (31 December 2025).

=== Ethnicity ===
Census 2021 (1+ %)
Ethnicity	Number	Fraction
Slovak	398	90.24%
Not found out	36	8.16%
Hungarian	9	2.04%
Czech	5	1.13%
Total	441	

In year 2021 was 441 people by ethnicity 398 as Slovak, 36 as Not found out, 9 as Hungarian, 5 as Czech, 1 as Romani and 1 as Other.

Note on population: The difference values of population numbers in the table "Population statistic" and in the sections "Ethnicity" & "Religion" is caused by the use of various statistical methods.

=== Religion ===
Census 2021 (1+ %)
Religion	Number	Fraction
Roman Catholic Church	296	67.12%
None	67	15.19%
Not found out	32	7.26%
Evangelical Church	31	7.03%
Greek Catholic Church	7	1.59%
Total	441	

In year 2021 was 441 people by religion 296 from Roman Catholic Church, 67 from None, 32 from Not found out, 31 from Evangelical Church, 7 from Greek Catholic Church, 3 from Jehovah's Witnesses, 2 from Ad hoc movements, 1 from Other and not ascertained christian church, 1 from Hinduism and 1 from United Methodist Church.
