= Nová Ves (Žďár nad Sázavou District) =

- Municipality
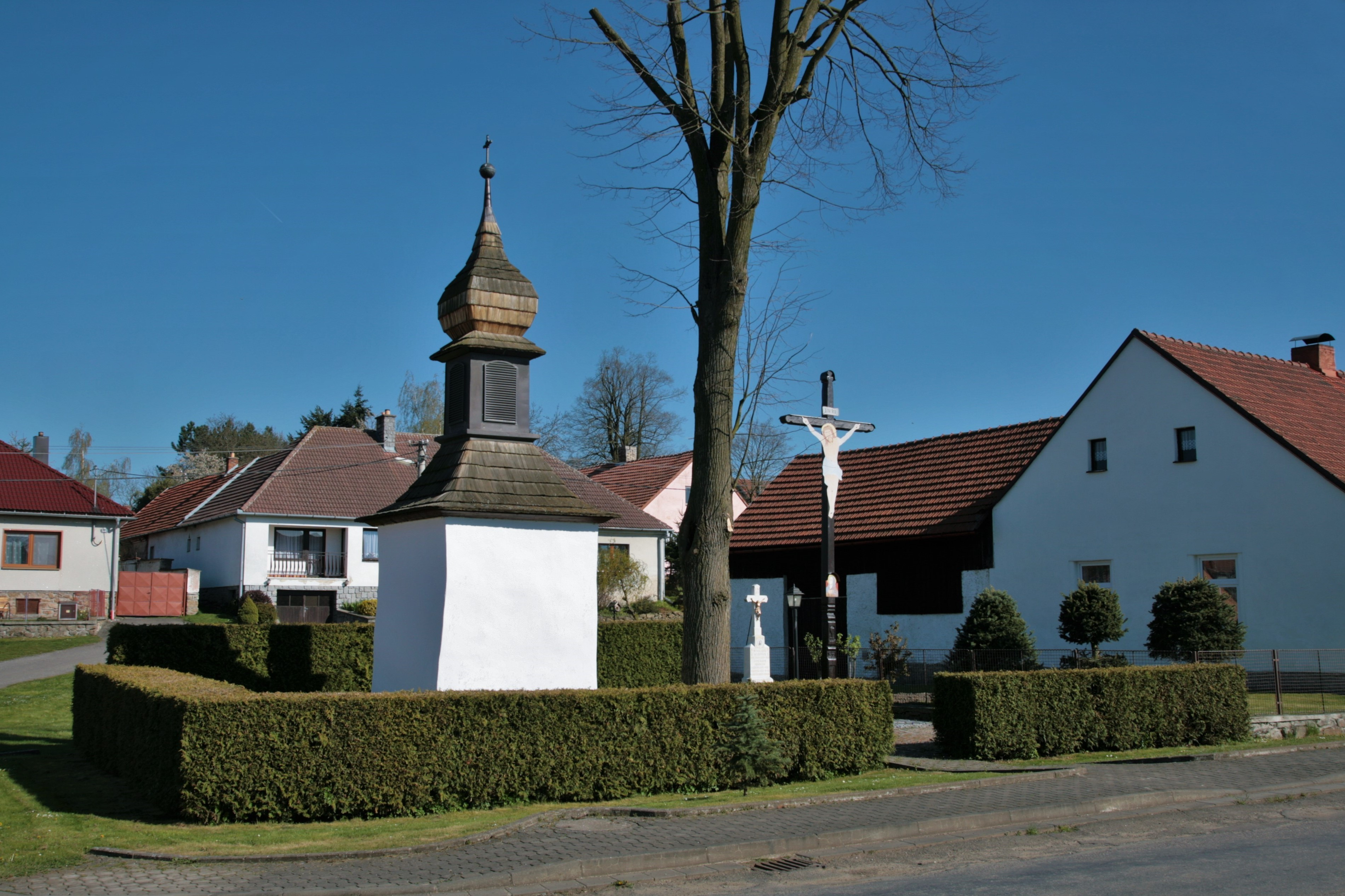
- Belfry in the centre of Nová Ves

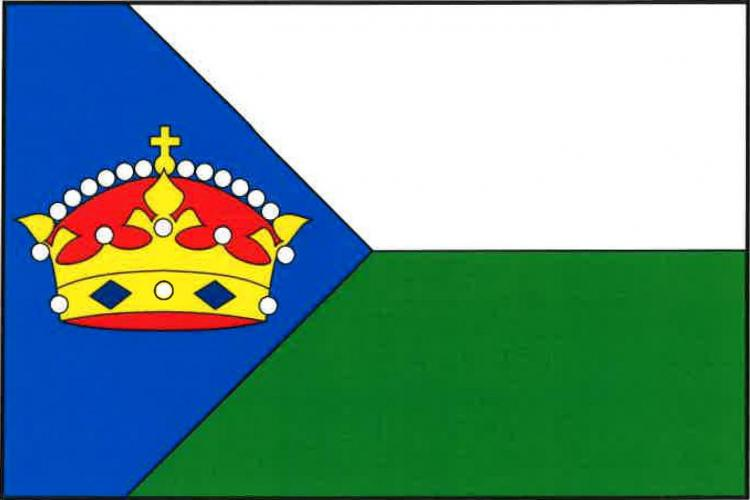
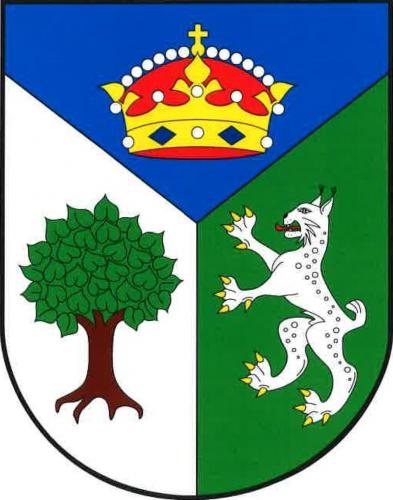
- Flag Coat of arms

- Location in the Czech Republic
- Coordinates: 49°23′38″N 16°11′47″E
- Country: Czech Republic
- Region: Vysočina
- District: Žďár nad Sázavou
- First mentioned: 1364

Area
  - Total: 4.15 km^{2} (1.60 sq mi)
- Elevation: 537 m (1,762 ft)

Population (2026-01-01)
  - Total: 155
  - Density: 37.3/km^{2} (96.7/sq mi)
- Time zone: UTC+1 (CET)
  - Summer (DST): UTC+2 (CEST)
- Postal code: 594 51
- Website: www.novaveszr.cz

Nová Ves is a municipality and village in Žďár nad Sázavou District in the Vysočina Region of the Czech Republic. It has about 200 inhabitants.

Nová Ves lies approximately 27 kilometres (17 mi) south-east of Žďár nad Sázavou, 44 km (27 mi) east of Jihlava, and 149 km (93 mi) south-east of Prague.

== Demographics ==
Historical population
Year	Pop.	±%
1869	223	—
1880	268	+20.2%
1890	227	−15.3%
1900	204	−10.1%
1910	209	+2.5%
1921	221	+5.7%
1930	228	+3.2%
1950	184	−19.3%
1961	211	+14.7%
1970	204	−3.3%
1980	158	−22.5%
1991	157	−0.6%
2001	181	+15.3%
2011	170	−6.1%
2021	153	−10.0%
Source: Censuses
