= Voděrady (Rychnov nad Kněžnou District) =

- Municipality
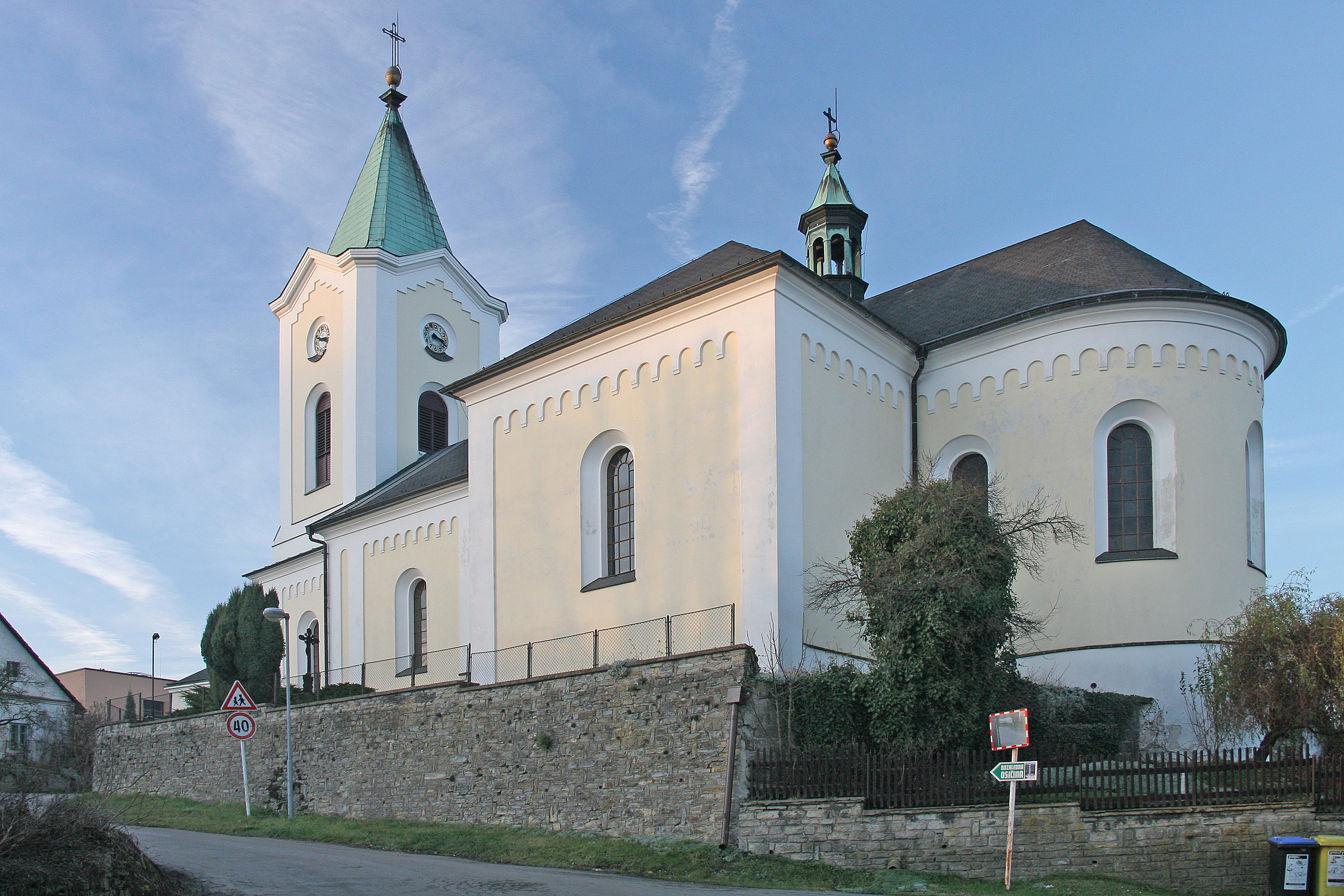
- Church of Saints Peter and Paul

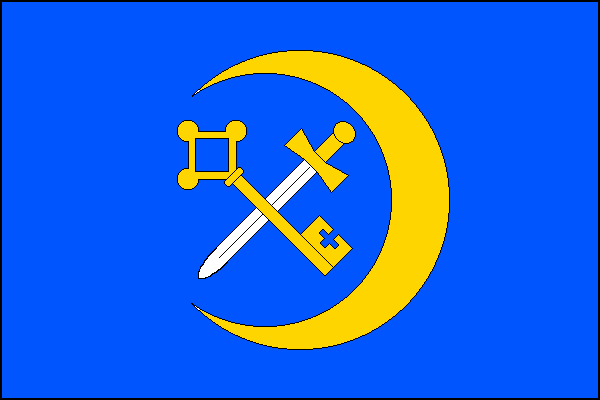
- Flag Coat of arms

- Location in the Czech Republic
- Coordinates: 50°12′31″N 16°9′12″E
- Country: Czech Republic
- Region: Hradec Králové
- District: Rychnov nad Kněžnou
- First mentioned: 1355

Area
  - Total: 15.06 km^{2} (5.81 sq mi)
- Elevation: 362 m (1,188 ft)

Population (2026-01-01)
  - Total: 730
  - Density: 48/km^{2} (130/sq mi)
- Time zone: UTC+1 (CET)
  - Summer (DST): UTC+2 (CEST)
- Postal codes: 517 21, 517 34
- Website: obec-voderady.cz

Voděrady is a municipality and village in Rychnov nad Kněžnou District in the Hradec Králové Region of the Czech Republic. It has about 700 inhabitants.

== Administrative division ==
Voděrady consists of six municipal parts (in brackets population according to the 2021 census):

- Voděrady (305)
- Ježkovice (38)
- Nová Ves (87)
- Uhřínovice (156)
- Vojenice (77)
- Vyhnanice (43)

== Demographics ==
Historical population
Year	Pop.	±%
1869	1,530	—
1880	1,559	+1.9%
1890	1,514	−2.9%
1900	1,438	−5.0%
1910	1,379	−4.1%
1921	1,301	−5.7%
1930	1,154	−11.3%
1950	931	−19.3%
1961	926	−0.5%
1970	775	−16.3%
1980	735	−5.2%
1991	638	−13.2%
2001	638	+0.0%
2011	669	+4.9%
2021	706	+5.5%
Source: Censuses
