= Nová Ves u Bakova =

- Municipality
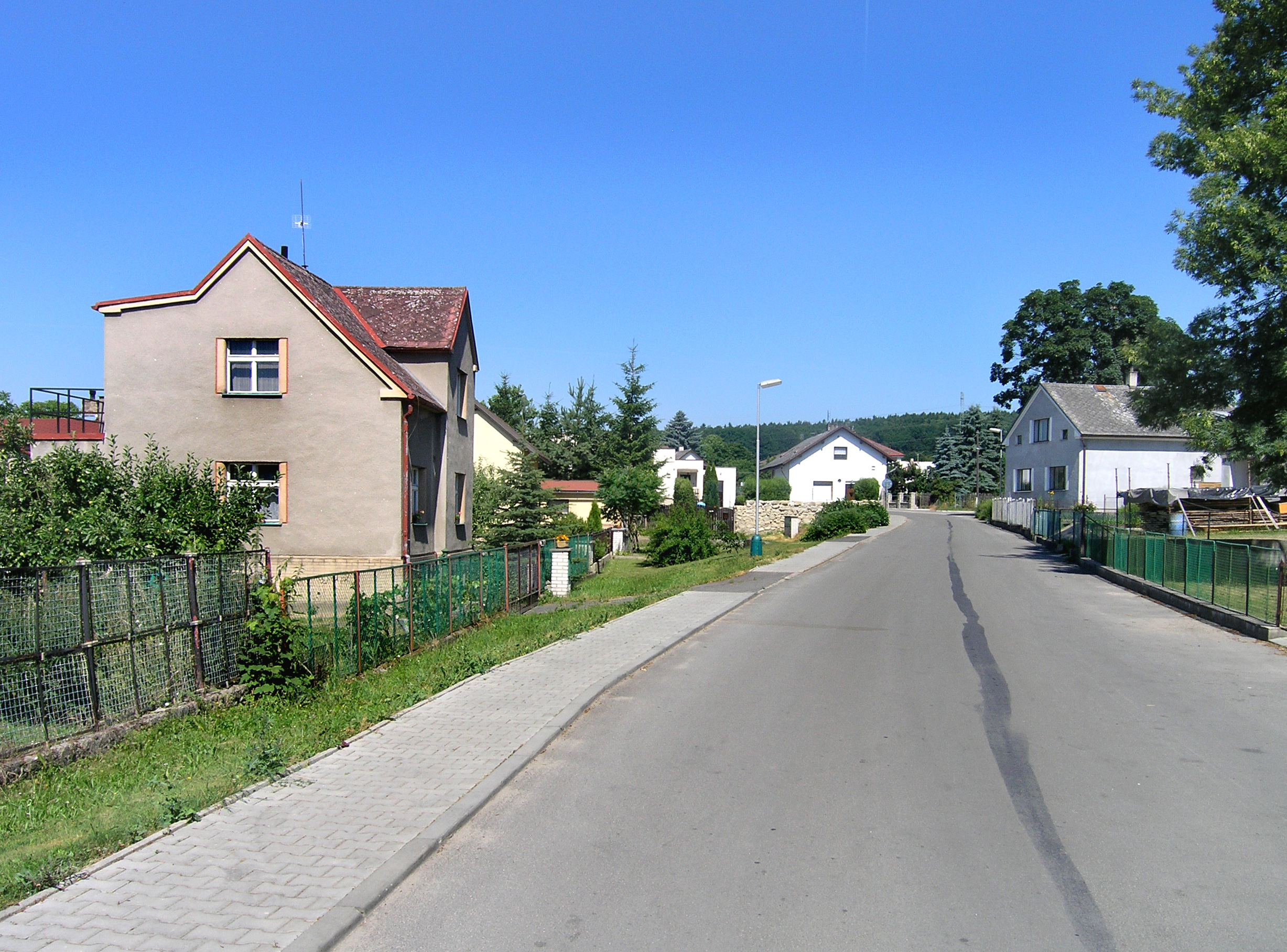
- Main street

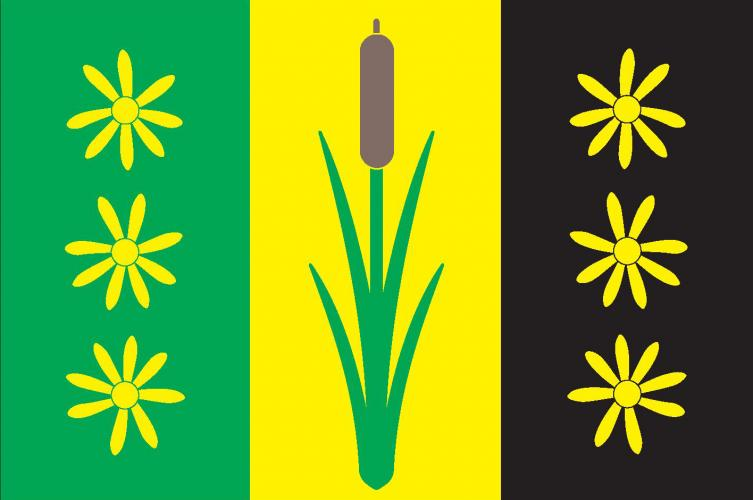
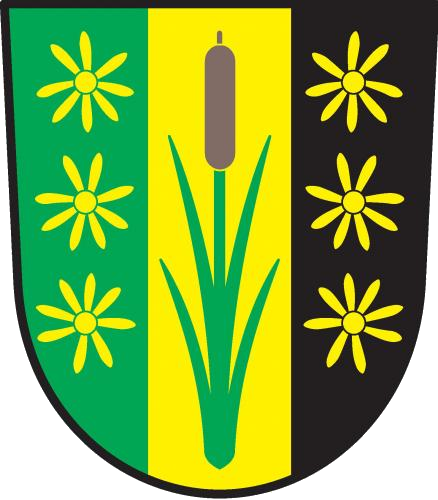
- Flag Coat of arms

- Location in the Czech Republic
- Coordinates: 50°29′27″N 14°55′35″E
- Country: Czech Republic
- Region: Central Bohemian
- District: Mladá Boleslav
- First mentioned: 1608

Area
  - Total: 3.66 km^{2} (1.41 sq mi)
- Elevation: 217 m (712 ft)

Population (2026-01-01)
  - Total: 297
  - Density: 81.1/km^{2} (210/sq mi)
- Time zone: UTC+1 (CET)
  - Summer (DST): UTC+2 (CEST)
- Postal code: 294 01
- Website: www.novavesubakova.cz

Nová Ves u Bakova is a municipality and village in Mladá Boleslav District in the Central Bohemian Region of the Czech Republic. It has about 300 inhabitants.

== Etymology ==
The name means "new village near Bakov" in Czech. The name refers to the fact that it was created next to an older village (specifically Malá Bělá, today part of Bakov nad Jizerou).

== Geography ==
Nová Ves u Bakova is located about 7 kilometres (4 mi) north of Mladá Boleslav and 52 km (32 mi) northeast of Prague. It lies on the border between the Jičín Uplands and Jizera Table. The highest point is the hill Lovotín at 284 m (932 ft) above sea level. The municipality is situated on the right bank of the Jizera River, which forms its eastern border. The Bělá Stream flows along the southern municipal border. The Rokytka Brook flows through the western part of the municipality and then joins the Bělá.

The area around the Rokytka is protected as the Rečkov National Nature Monument with an area of 24.4 ha (60 acres). The subject of protection are marshy meadows and wetland that forms a biotope of rare and endangered species of plants and animals, including the Desmoulin's whorl snail and the plant Ligularia sibirica.

== History ==
The first written mention of Nová Ves u Bakova is from 1608. The village was founded in the second half of the 16th century by the Lords of Zvířetice. During the Thirty Years' War, the village was acquired by the Waldstein family.

== Demographics ==
Historical population

Year	Pop.	±%
1869	273	—
1880	266	−2.6%
1890	330	+24.1%
1900	473	+43.3%
1910	475	+0.4%

Year	Pop.	±%
1921	435	−8.4%
1930	395	−9.2%
1950	346	−12.4%
1961	334	−3.5%
1970	315	−5.7%

Year	Pop.	±%
1980	298	−5.4%
1991	221	−25.8%
2001	236	+6.8%
2011	255	+8.1%
2021	291	+14.1%

Source: Censuses

== Transport ==
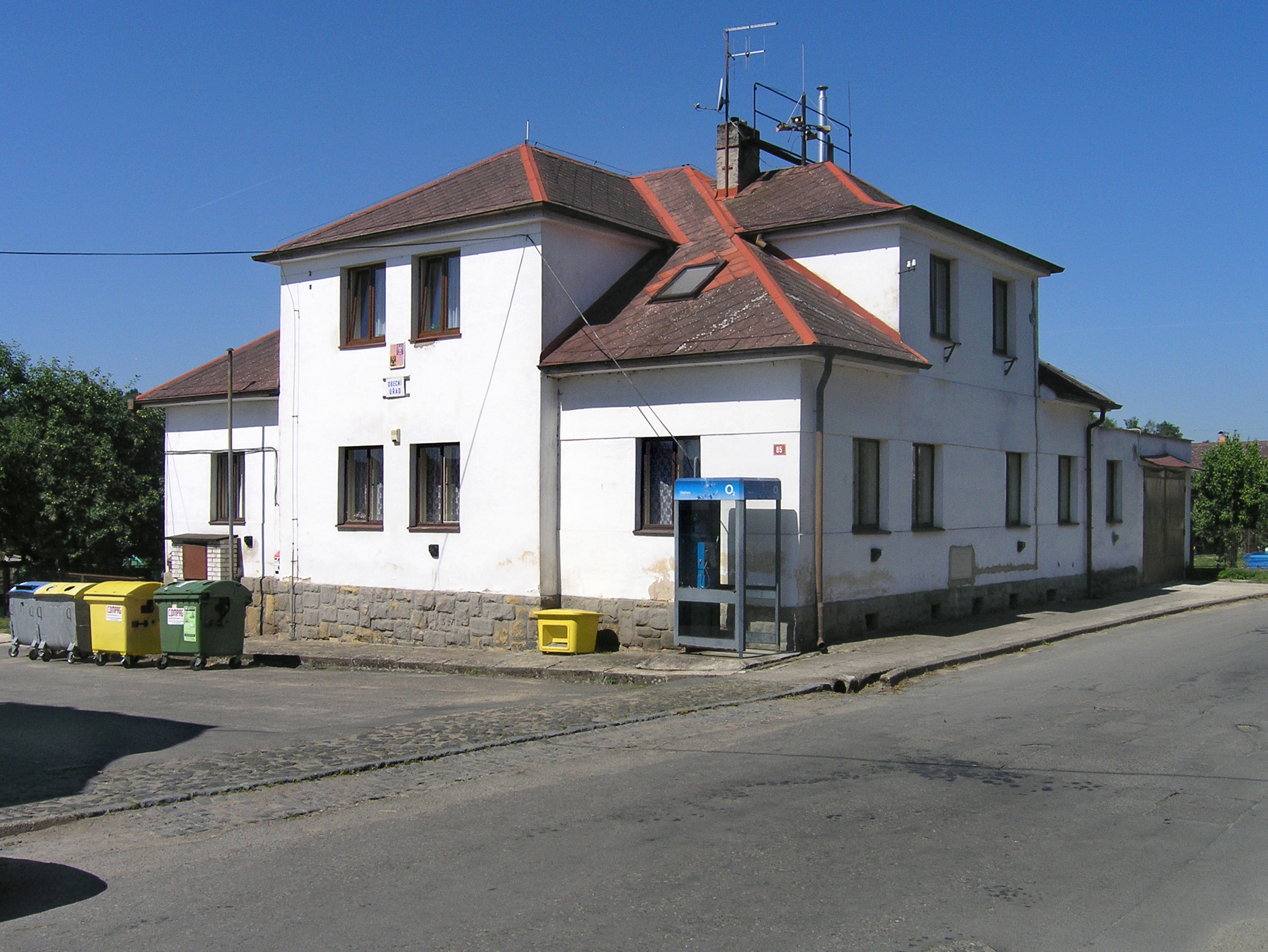
Municipal office

There are no railways or major roads passing through the municipality.

== Sights ==
The only protected cultural monument in the municipality is a wooden granary from the end of the 18th century, but it has been in a dilapidated condition since 2016.
