= Nová Ves (Třebíč District) =

- Municipality
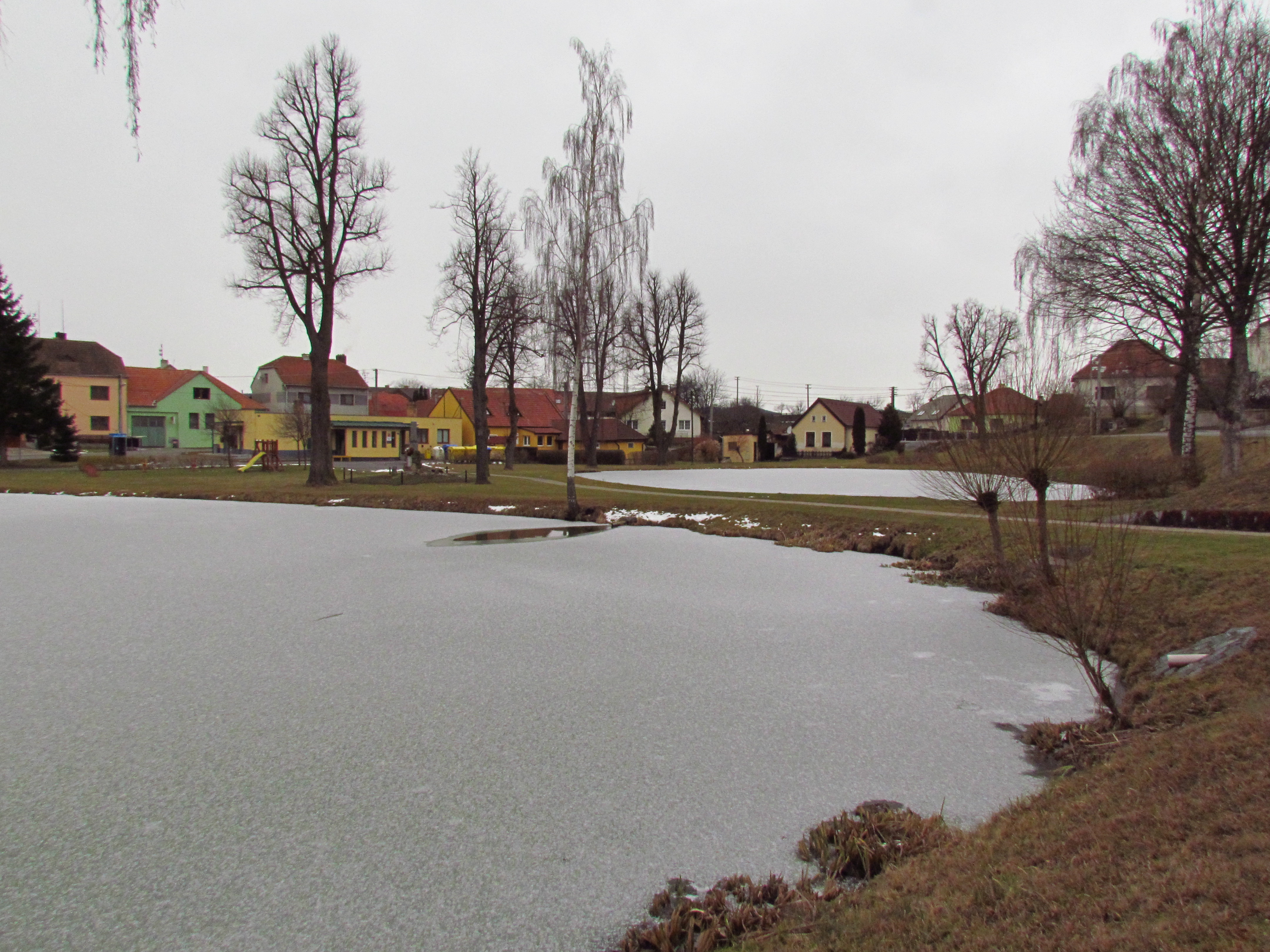
- Centre of Nová Ves

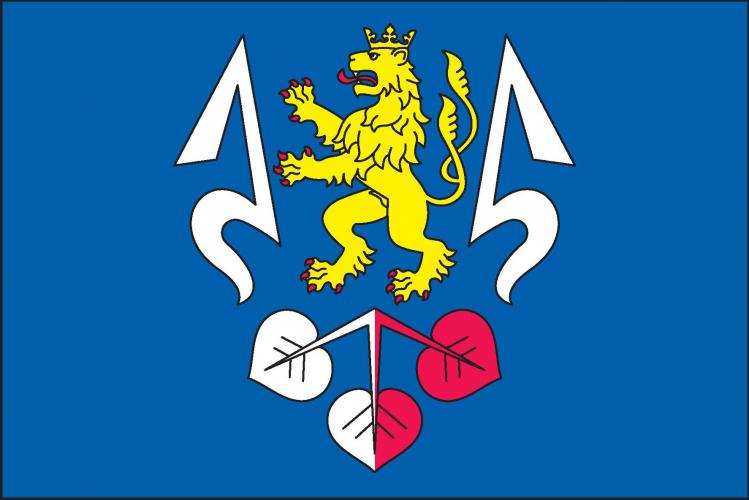
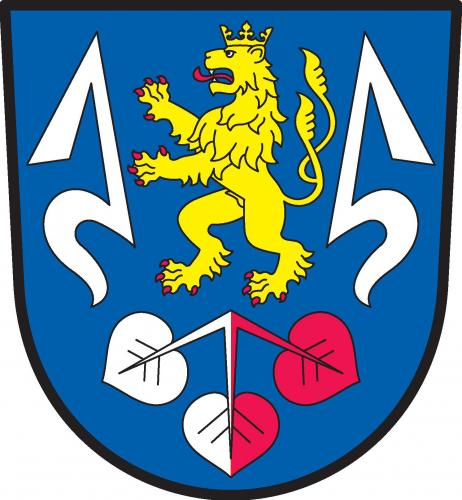
- Flag Coat of arms

- Location in the Czech Republic
- Coordinates: 49°14′55″N 15°48′14″E
- Country: Czech Republic
- Region: Vysočina
- District: Třebíč
- First mentioned: 1459

Area
  - Total: 4.35 km^{2} (1.68 sq mi)
- Elevation: 438 m (1,437 ft)

Population (2026-01-01)
  - Total: 262
  - Density: 60.2/km^{2} (156/sq mi)
- Time zone: UTC+1 (CET)
  - Summer (DST): UTC+2 (CEST)
- Postal code: 675 21
- Website: www.ou-nova-ves.cz

Nová Ves is a municipality and village in Třebíč District in the Vysočina Region of the Czech Republic. It has about 300 inhabitants.

Nová Ves lies approximately 7 kilometres (4 mi) north-west of Třebíč, 23 km (14 mi) south-east of Jihlava, and 136 km (85 mi) south-east of Prague.

== Demographics ==
Historical population
Year	Pop.	±%
1869	186	—
1880	202	+8.6%
1890	215	+6.4%
1900	198	−7.9%
1910	209	+5.6%
1921	207	−1.0%
1930	222	+7.2%
1950	210	−5.4%
1961	242	+15.2%
1970	213	−12.0%
1980	214	+0.5%
1991	188	−12.1%
2001	201	+6.9%
2011	202	+0.5%
2021	246	+21.8%
Source: Censuses
