= Zaječov =

- Municipality
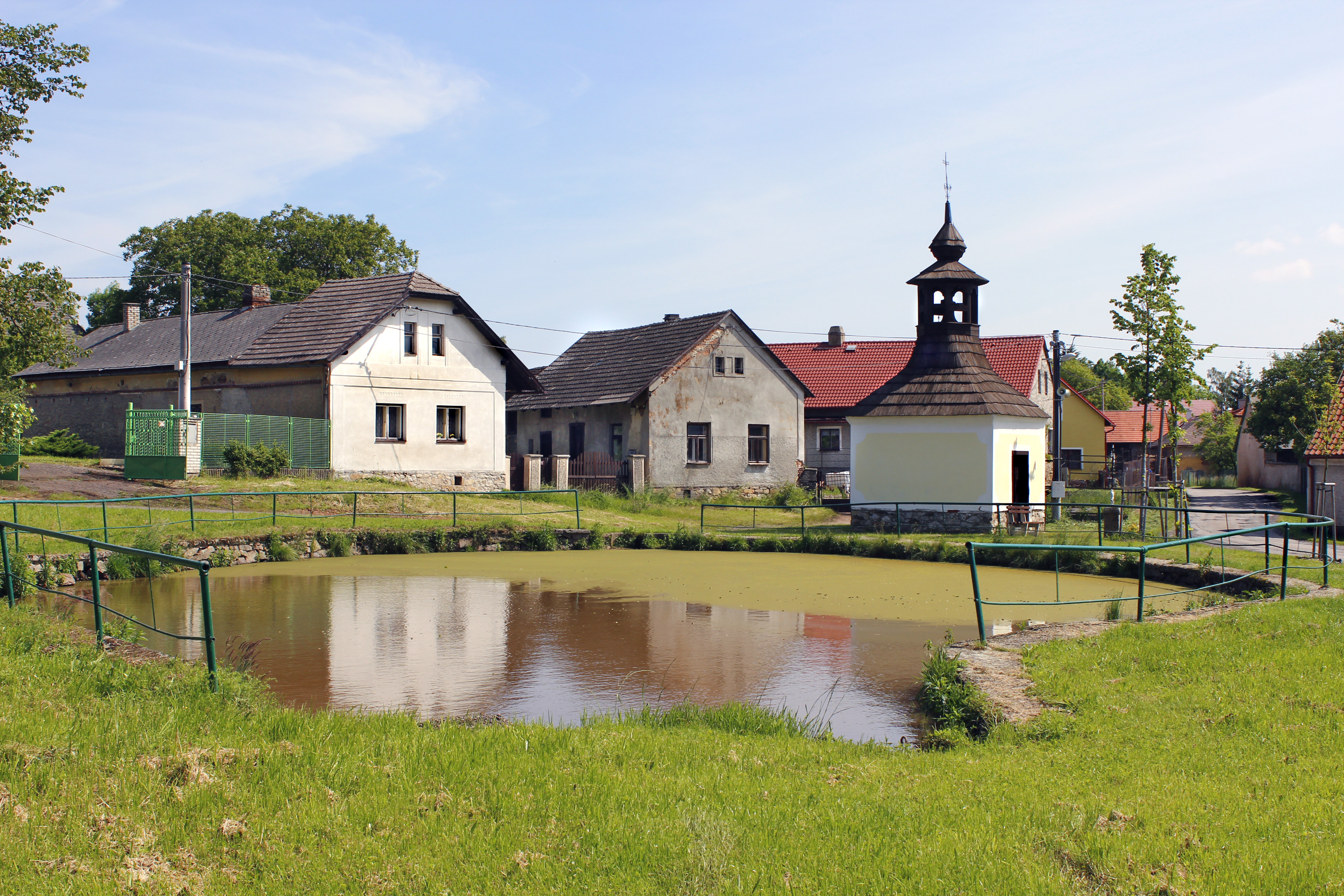
- Upper common

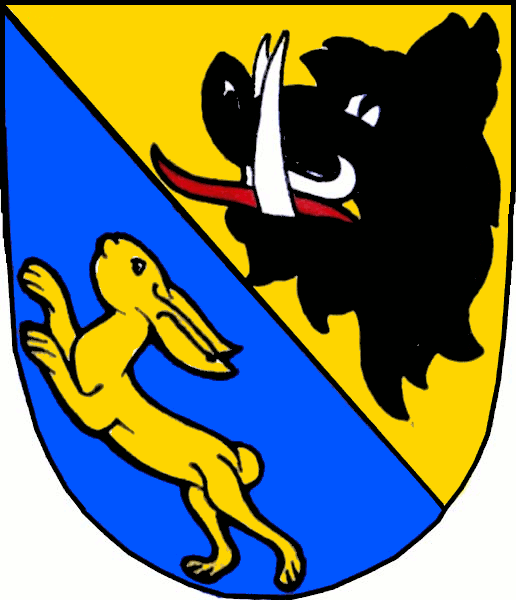
- Flag Coat of arms

- Location in the Czech Republic
- Coordinates: 49°46′28″N 13°50′27″E
- Country: Czech Republic
- Region: Central Bohemian
- District: Beroun
- First mentioned: 1578

Area
  - Total: 22.25 km^{2} (8.59 sq mi)
- Elevation: 458 m (1,503 ft)

Population (2026-01-01)
  - Total: 1,510
  - Density: 67.9/km^{2} (176/sq mi)
- Time zone: UTC+1 (CET)
  - Summer (DST): UTC+2 (CEST)
- Postal codes: 267 62, 267 63
- Website: www.zajecov.cz

Zaječov is a municipality and village in Beroun District in the Central Bohemian Region of the Czech Republic. It has about 1,500 inhabitants.

== Administrative division ==
Zaječov consists of three municipal parts (in brackets population according to the 2021 census):

- Zaječov (783)
- Kvaň (451)
- Nová Ves (211)

== Etymology ==
The name Zaječov is derived from the adjective zaječí (from the Czech word zajíc, i.e. 'hare').

== Geography ==
Zaječov is located about 25 kilometres (16 mi) southwest of Beroun and 47 km (29 mi) southwest of Prague. It lies in the Brdy Highlands. The highest point is the mountain Jordán at 826 m (2,710 ft) above sea level. The southern part of the municipal territory lies in the Brdy Protected Landscape Area.

== History ==
The first written mention of Zaječov is from 1578. On 1 January 1976, the municipalities of Zaječov and Kvaň were merged.

== Demographics ==
Historical population

Year	Pop.	±%
1869	2,003	—
1880	1,956	−2.3%
1890	1,927	−1.5%
1900	1,971	+2.3%
1910	2,001	+1.5%

Year	Pop.	±%
1921	1,920	−4.0%
1930	1,896	−1.2%
1950	2,576	+35.9%
1961	1,677	−34.9%
1970	1,565	−6.7%

Year	Pop.	±%
1980	1,415	−9.6%
1991	1,359	−4.0%
2001	1,346	−1.0%
2011	1,407	+4.5%
2021	1,445	+2.7%

Source: Censuses

== Transport ==
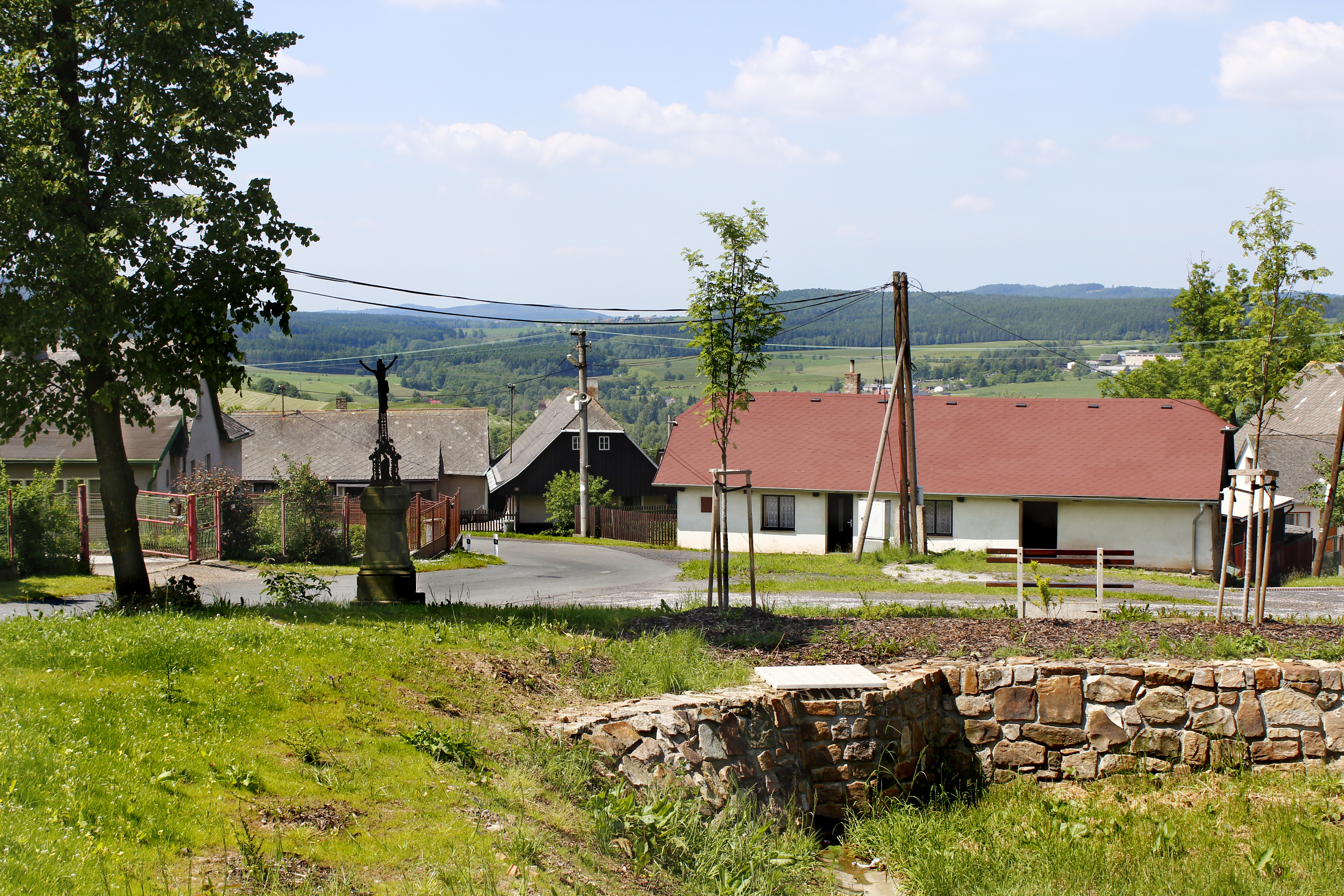
The village of Kvaň

There are no railways or major roads passing through the municipality.

== Sights ==
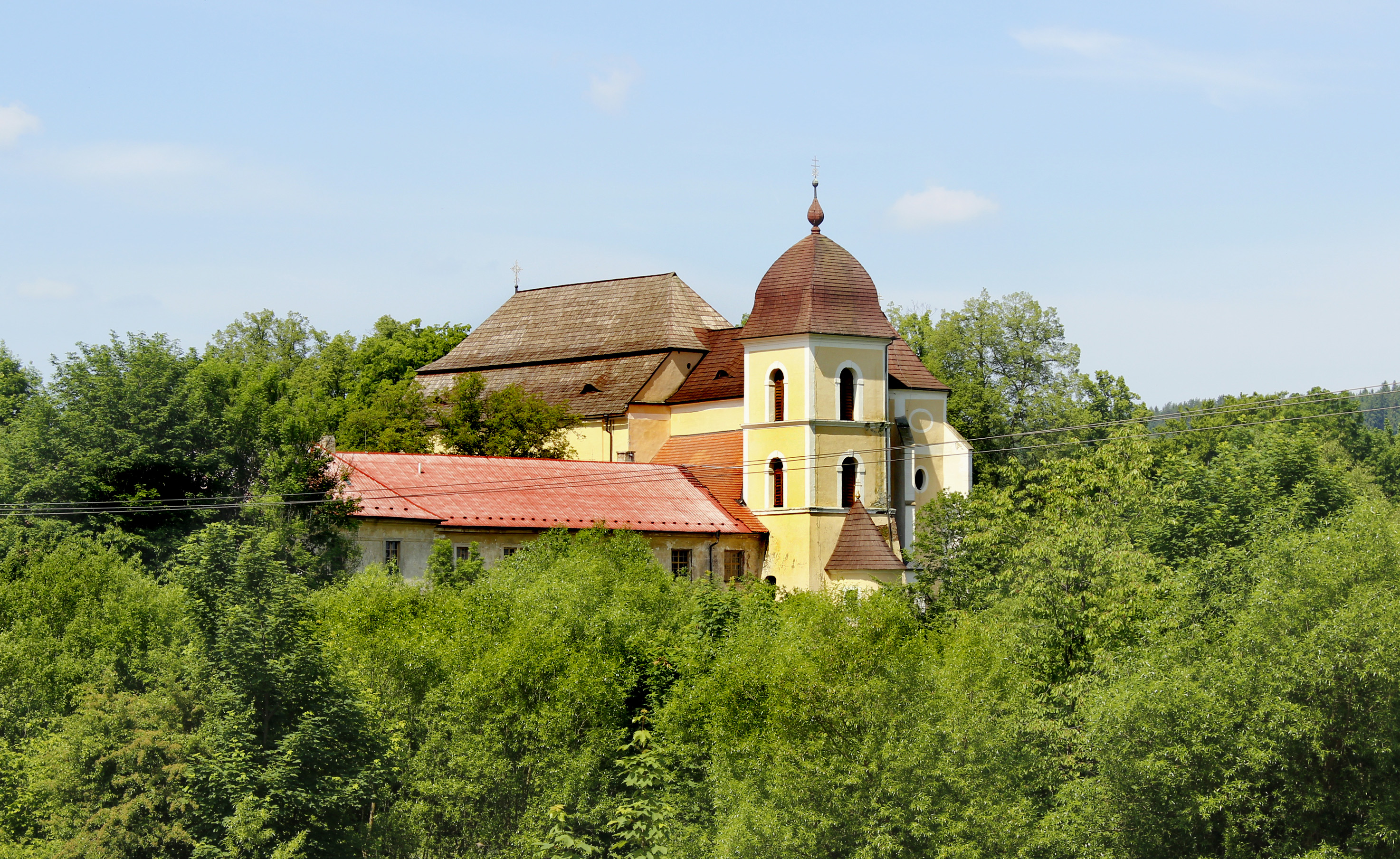
Svatá Dobrotivá Monastery

The Svatá Dobrotivá Monastery was founded in 1262–1263 as the first Augustinian monastery in the Czech lands. The Gothic building was rebuilt in the Baroque style in the 17th century, the monastery church of the Annunciation was rebuilt in 1713–1719. In 1785, the monastery was abolished and the building converted into a rectory and a school. In 1990, the area was returned to the Augustinians.
