= Kocbeře =

- Municipality
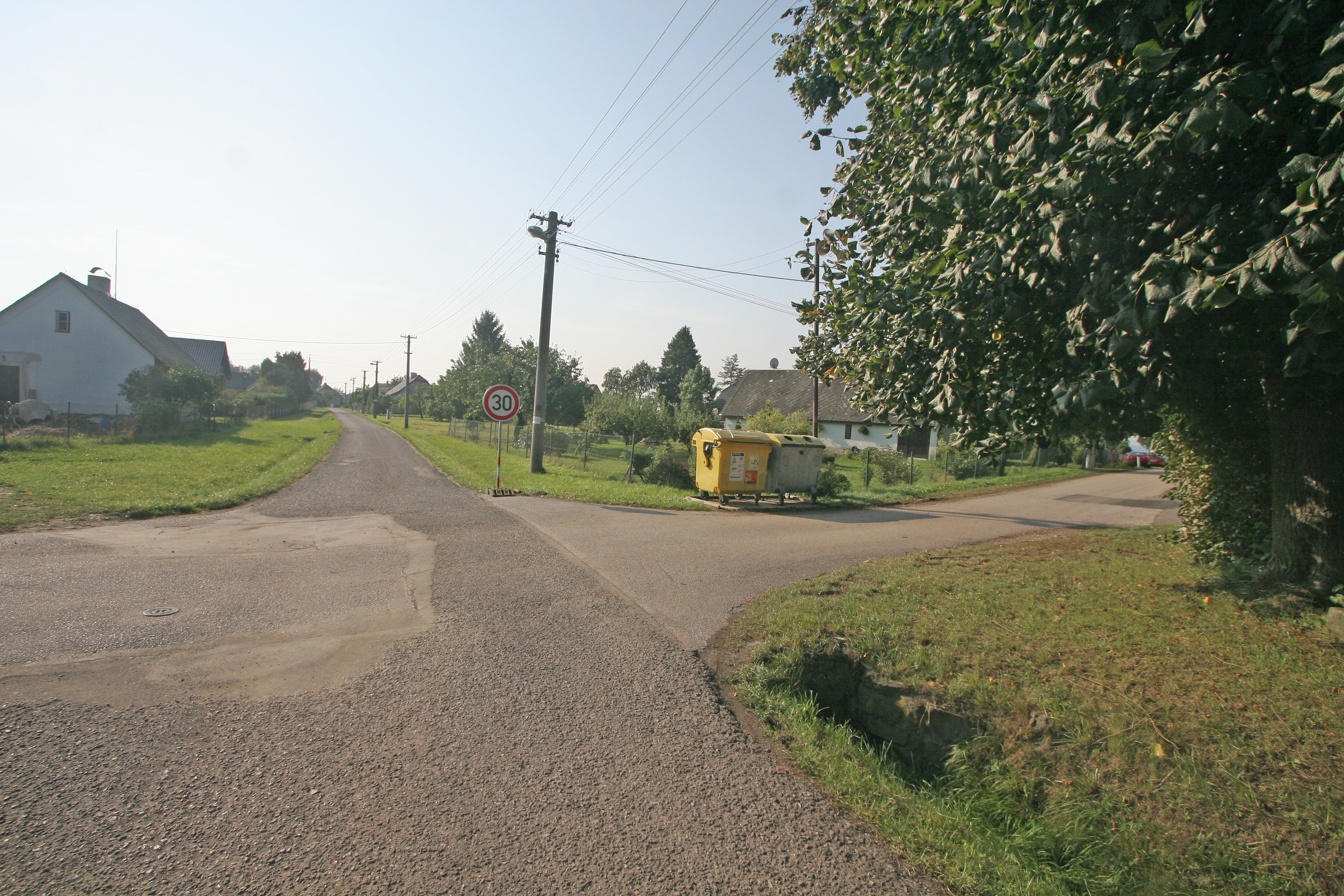
- Centre of Kocbeře

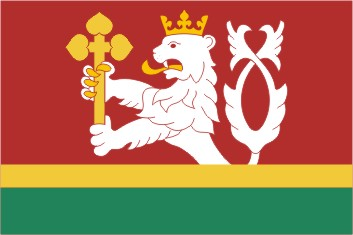
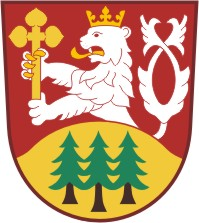
- Flag Coat of arms

- Location in the Czech Republic
- Coordinates: 50°27′13″N 15°51′32″E
- Country: Czech Republic
- Region: Hradec Králové
- District: Trutnov
- First mentioned: 1415

Area
  - Total: 10.93 km^{2} (4.22 sq mi)
- Elevation: 439 m (1,440 ft)

Population (2026-01-01)
  - Total: 517
  - Density: 47.3/km^{2} (123/sq mi)
- Time zone: UTC+1 (CET)
  - Summer (DST): UTC+2 (CEST)
- Postal code: 544 64
- Website: www.kocbere.cz

Kocbeře (German: Rettendorf) is a municipality and village in Trutnov District in the Hradec Králové Region of the Czech Republic. It has about 500 inhabitants.

== Administrative division ==
Kocbeře consists of three municipal parts (in brackets population according to the 2021 census):

- Kocbeře (263)
- Nová Ves (43)
- Nové Kocbeře (194)

== Demographics ==
Historical population
Year	Pop.	±%
1869	1,099	—
1880	1,063	−3.3%
1890	1,030	−3.1%
1900	1,112	+8.0%
1910	985	−11.4%
1921	881	−10.6%
1930	995	+12.9%
1950	670	−32.7%
1961	728	+8.7%
1970	627	−13.9%
1980	568	−9.4%
1991	497	−12.5%
2001	505	+1.6%
2011	525	+4.0%
2021	500	−4.8%
Source: Censuses
