= Nová Ves u Chýnova =

- Municipality
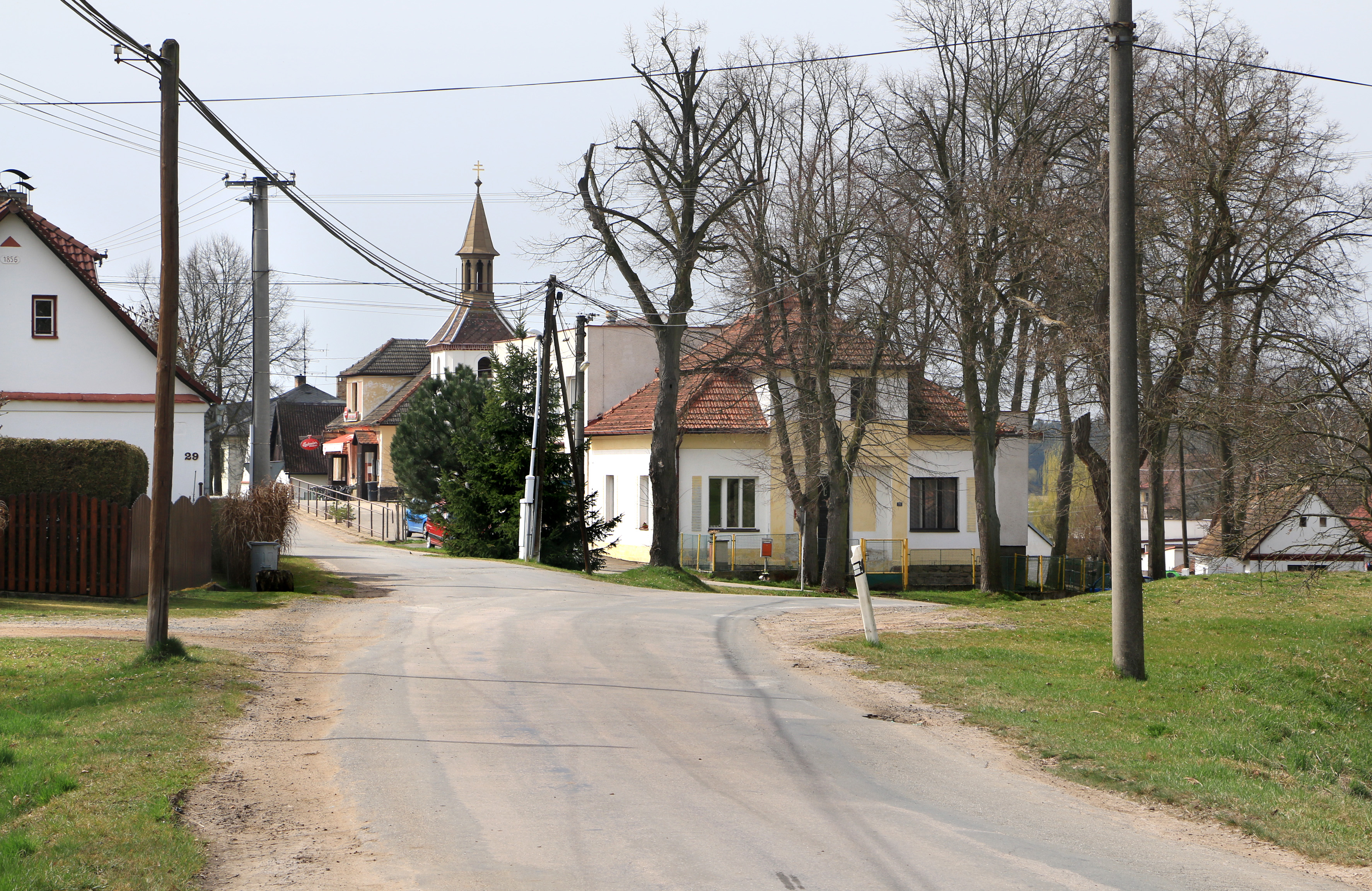
- Eastern part of Nová Ves u Chýnova

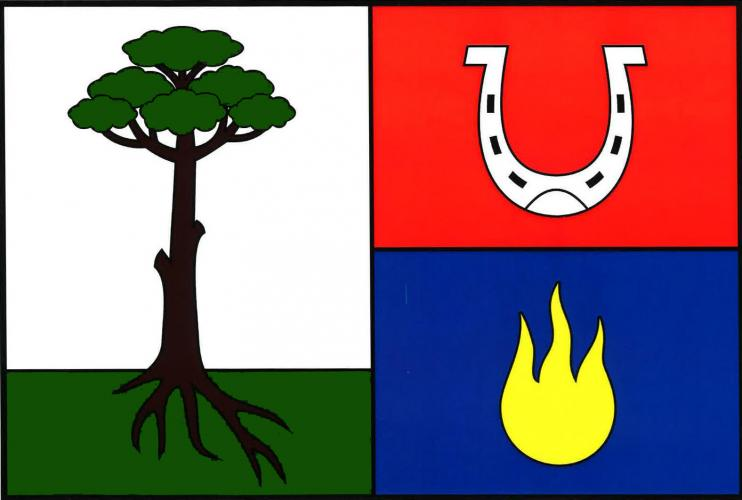
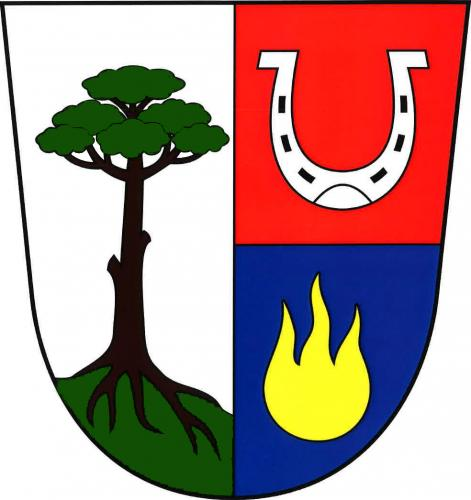
- Flag Coat of arms

- Location in the Czech Republic
- Coordinates: 49°23′34″N 14°46′59″E
- Country: Czech Republic
- Region: South Bohemian
- District: Tábor
- First mentioned: 1379

Area
  - Total: 6.62 km^{2} (2.56 sq mi)
- Elevation: 425 m (1,394 ft)

Population (2026-01-01)
  - Total: 331
  - Density: 50.0/km^{2} (129/sq mi)
- Time zone: UTC+1 (CET)
  - Summer (DST): UTC+2 (CEST)
- Postal code: 391 55
- Website: www.novavesuchynova.cz

Nová Ves u Chýnova is a municipality and village in Tábor District in the South Bohemian Region of the Czech Republic. It has about 300 inhabitants.

Nová Ves u Chýnova lies approximately 10 kilometres (6 mi) east of Tábor, 52 km (32 mi) north-east of České Budějovice, and 82 km (51 mi) south of Prague.

== Demographics ==
Historical population
Year	Pop.	±%
1869	432	—
1880	490	+13.4%
1890	433	−11.6%
1900	373	−13.9%
1910	330	−11.5%
1921	322	−2.4%
1930	311	−3.4%
1950	287	−7.7%
1961	286	−0.3%
1970	236	−17.5%
1980	220	−6.8%
1991	222	+0.9%
2001	226	+1.8%
2011	273	+20.8%
2021	322	+17.9%
Source: Censuses
