= Nová Ves (Strakonice District) =

- Municipality
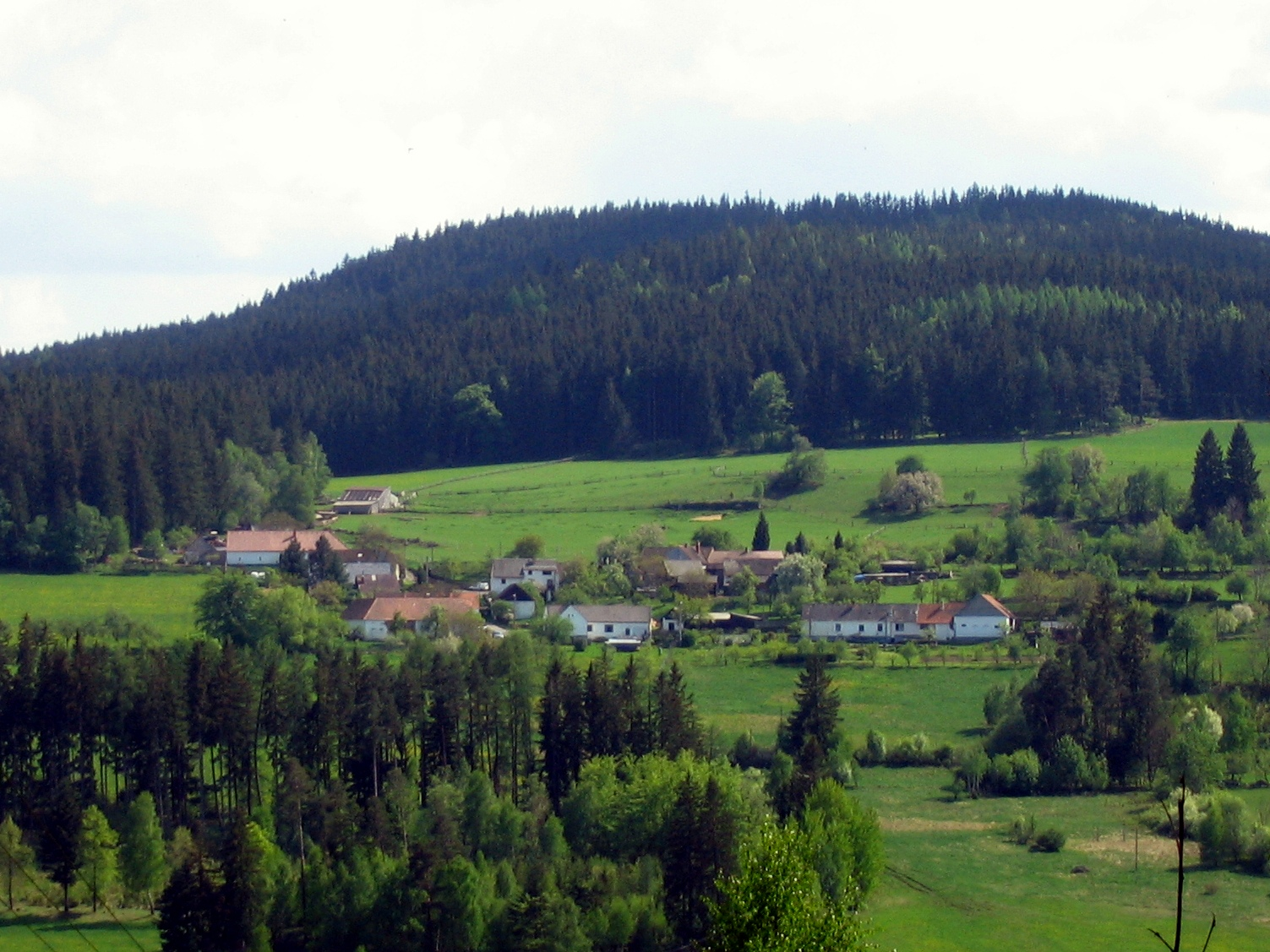
- Lhota pod Kůstrým, a part of Nová Ves

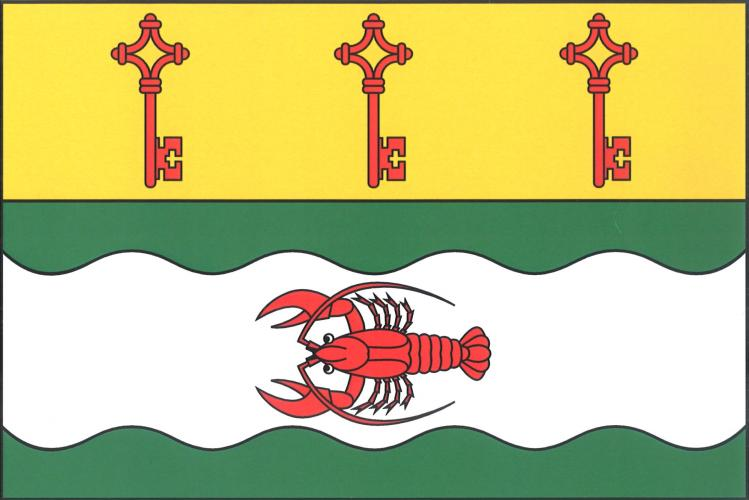
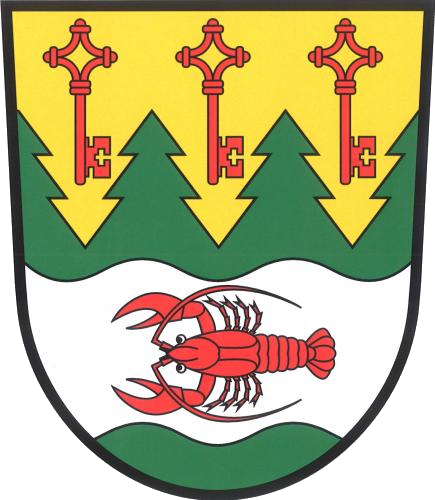
- Flag Coat of arms

- Location in the Czech Republic
- Coordinates: 49°11′15″N 13°44′1″E
- Country: Czech Republic
- Region: South Bohemian
- District: Strakonice
- First mentioned: 1549

Area
  - Total: 8.52 km^{2} (3.29 sq mi)
- Elevation: 599 m (1,965 ft)

Population (2026-01-01)
  - Total: 105
  - Density: 12.3/km^{2} (31.9/sq mi)
- Time zone: UTC+1 (CET)
  - Summer (DST): UTC+2 (CEST)
- Postal codes: 342 01, 387 19
- Website: www.obecnovaves.eu

Nová Ves is a municipality and village in Strakonice District in the South Bohemian Region of the Czech Republic. It has about 100 inhabitants.

Nová Ves lies approximately 15 kilometres (9 mi) south-west of Strakonice, 59 km (37 mi) north-west of České Budějovice, and 112 km (70 mi) south-west of Prague.

== Administrative division ==
Nová Ves consists of three municipal parts (in brackets population according to the 2021 census):

- Nová Ves (60)
- Lhota pod Kůstrým (7)
- Víska (30)

== Demographics ==
Historical population
| Year | Pop. | ±% |
|---|---|---|
| 1869 | 644 | — |
| 1880 | 688 | +6.8% |
| 1890 | 699 | +1.6% |
| 1900 | 693 | −0.9% |
| 1910 | 740 | +6.8% |
| 1921 | 624 | −15.7% |
| 1930 | 519 | −16.8% |
| 1950 | 379 | −27.0% |
| 1961 | 337 | −11.1% |
| 1970 | 240 | −28.8% |
| 1980 | 160 | −33.3% |
| 1991 | 116 | −27.5% |
| 2001 | 86 | −25.9% |
| 2011 | 91 | +5.8% |
| 2021 | 97 | +6.6% |
Source: Censuses
