= Nová Ves (Domažlice District) =

- Municipality
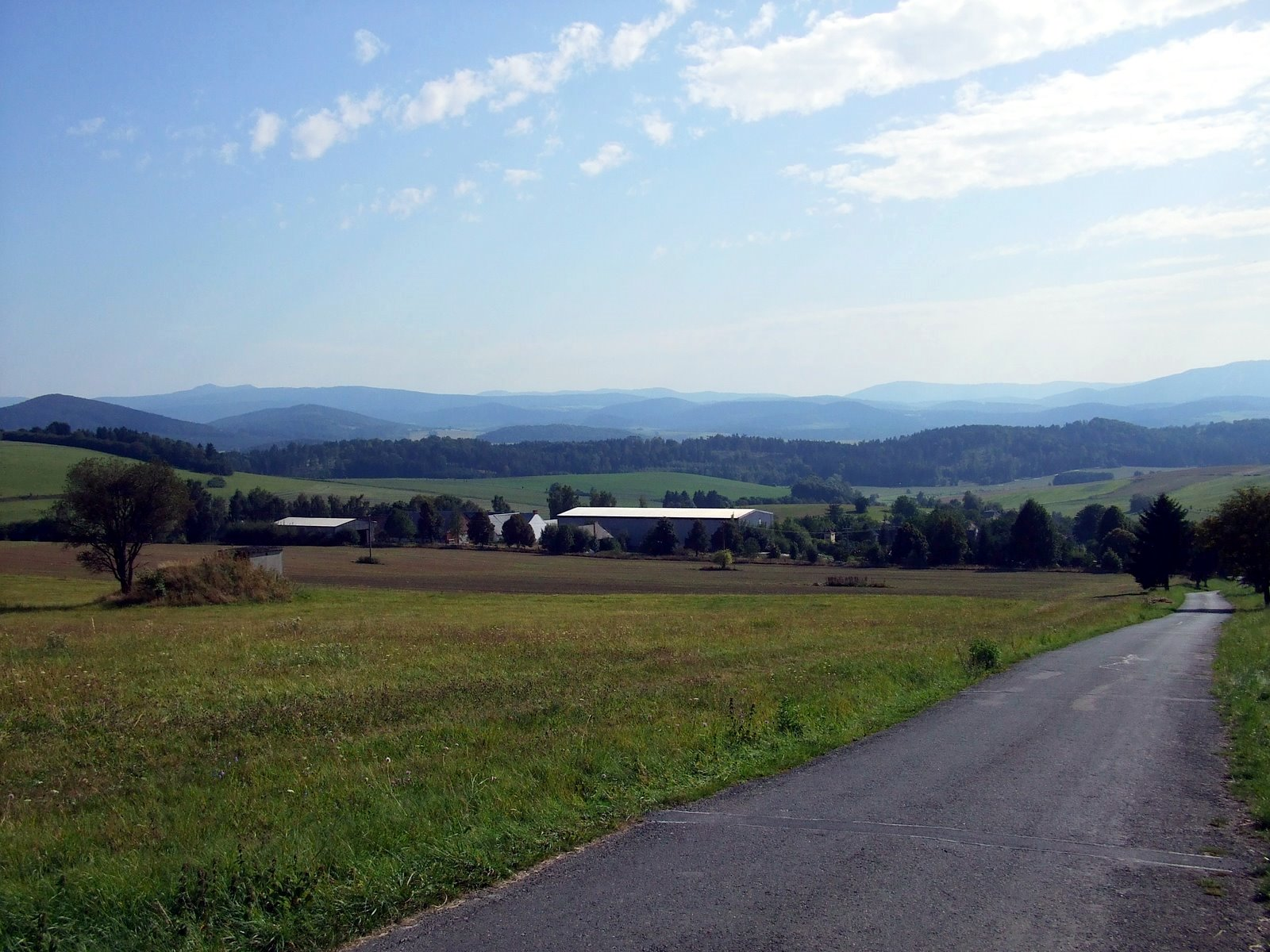
- View from the village

- Flag Coat of arms

- Location in the Czech Republic
- Coordinates: 49°22′0″N 13°2′20″E
- Country: Czech Republic
- Region: Plzeň
- District: Domažlice
- First mentioned: 1508

Area
  - Total: 4.66 km^{2} (1.80 sq mi)
- Elevation: 518 m (1,699 ft)

Population (2026-01-01)
  - Total: 146
  - Density: 31.3/km^{2} (81.1/sq mi)
- Time zone: UTC+1 (CET)
  - Summer (DST): UTC+2 (CEST)
- Postal code: 345 06
- Website: www.novaveskd.cz

Nová Ves is a municipality and village in Domažlice District in the Plzeň Region of the Czech Republic. It has about 100 inhabitants.

Nová Ves lies approximately 12 kilometres (7 mi) south-east of Domažlice, 50 km (31 mi) south-west of Plzeň, and 129 km (80 mi) south-west of Prague.

== Demographics ==
Historical population
Year	Pop.	±%
1869	319	—
1880	338	+6.0%
1890	304	−10.1%
1900	295	−3.0%
1910	329	+11.5%
1921	351	+6.7%
1930	318	−9.4%
1950	237	−25.5%
1961	235	−0.8%
1970	189	−19.6%
1980	153	−19.0%
1991	150	−2.0%
2001	158	+5.3%
2011	132	−16.5%
2021	139	+5.3%
Source: Censuses
