= Nová Ves u Leštiny =

- Municipality
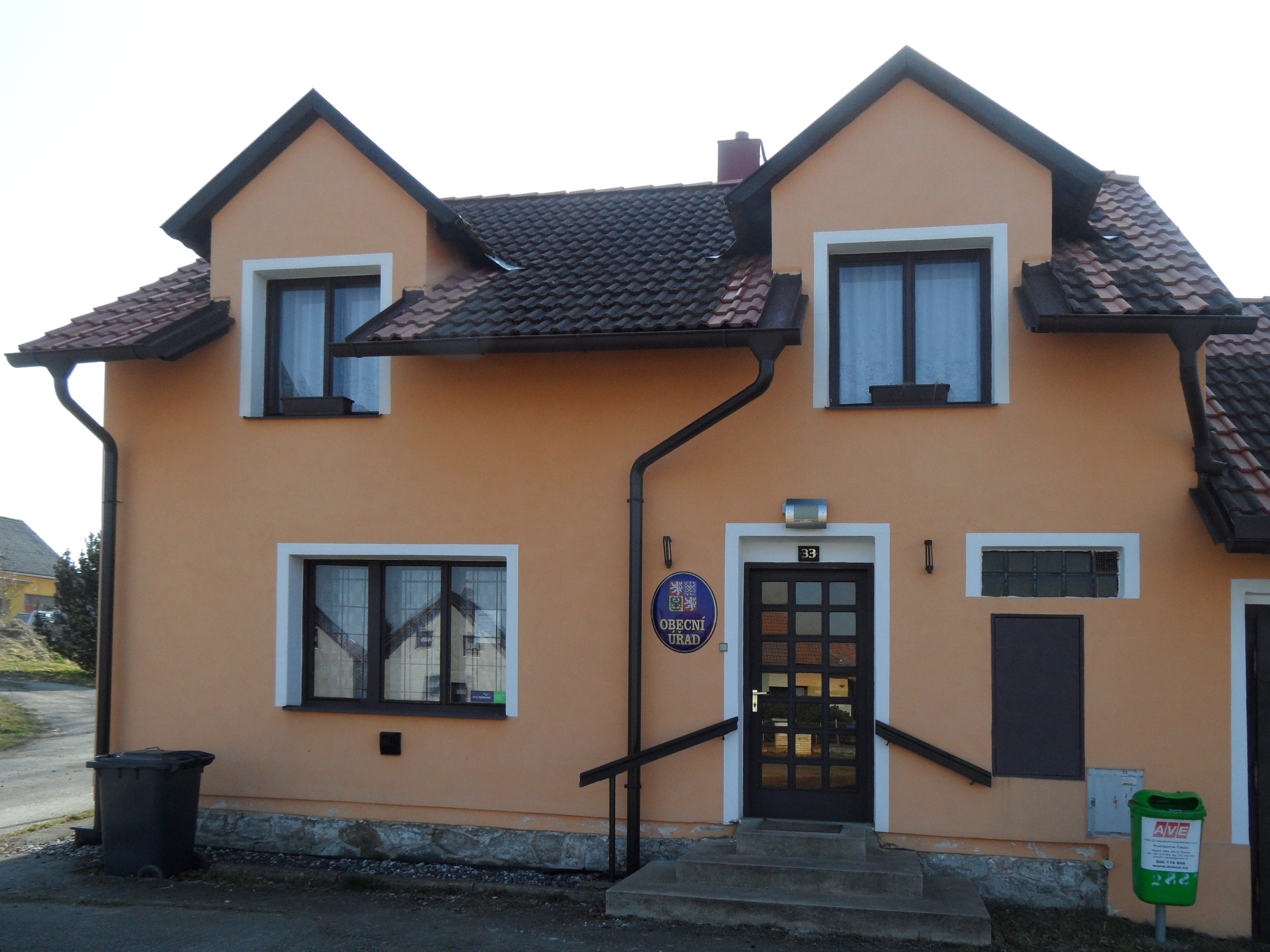
- Municipal office

- Location in the Czech Republic
- Coordinates: 49°47′9″N 15°24′14″E
- Country: Czech Republic
- Region: Vysočina
- District: Havlíčkův Brod
- First mentioned: 1391

Area
  - Total: 5.13 km^{2} (1.98 sq mi)
- Elevation: 450 m (1,480 ft)

Population (2026-01-01)
  - Total: 116
  - Density: 22.6/km^{2} (58.6/sq mi)
- Time zone: UTC+1 (CET)
  - Summer (DST): UTC+2 (CEST)
- Postal code: 582 82
- Website: www.novavesulestiny.cz

Nová Ves u Leštiny is a municipality and village in Havlíčkův Brod District in the Vysočina Region of the Czech Republic. It has about 100 inhabitants.

Nová Ves u Leštiny lies approximately 25 kilometres (16 mi) north-west of Havlíčkův Brod, 46 km (29 mi) north of Jihlava, and 78 km (48 mi) south-east of Prague.

== Demographics ==
Historical population
| Year | Pop. | ±% |
|---|---|---|
| 1869 | 326 | — |
| 1880 | 295 | −9.5% |
| 1890 | 274 | −7.1% |
| 1900 | 237 | −13.5% |
| 1910 | 224 | −5.5% |
| 1921 | 258 | +15.2% |
| 1930 | 208 | −19.4% |
| 1950 | 168 | −19.2% |
| 1961 | 178 | +6.0% |
| 1970 | 141 | −20.8% |
| 1980 | 129 | −8.5% |
| 1991 | 102 | −20.9% |
| 2001 | 105 | +2.9% |
| 2011 | 102 | −2.9% |
| 2021 | 114 | +11.8% |
Source: Censuses
