= Hradečno =

- Municipality
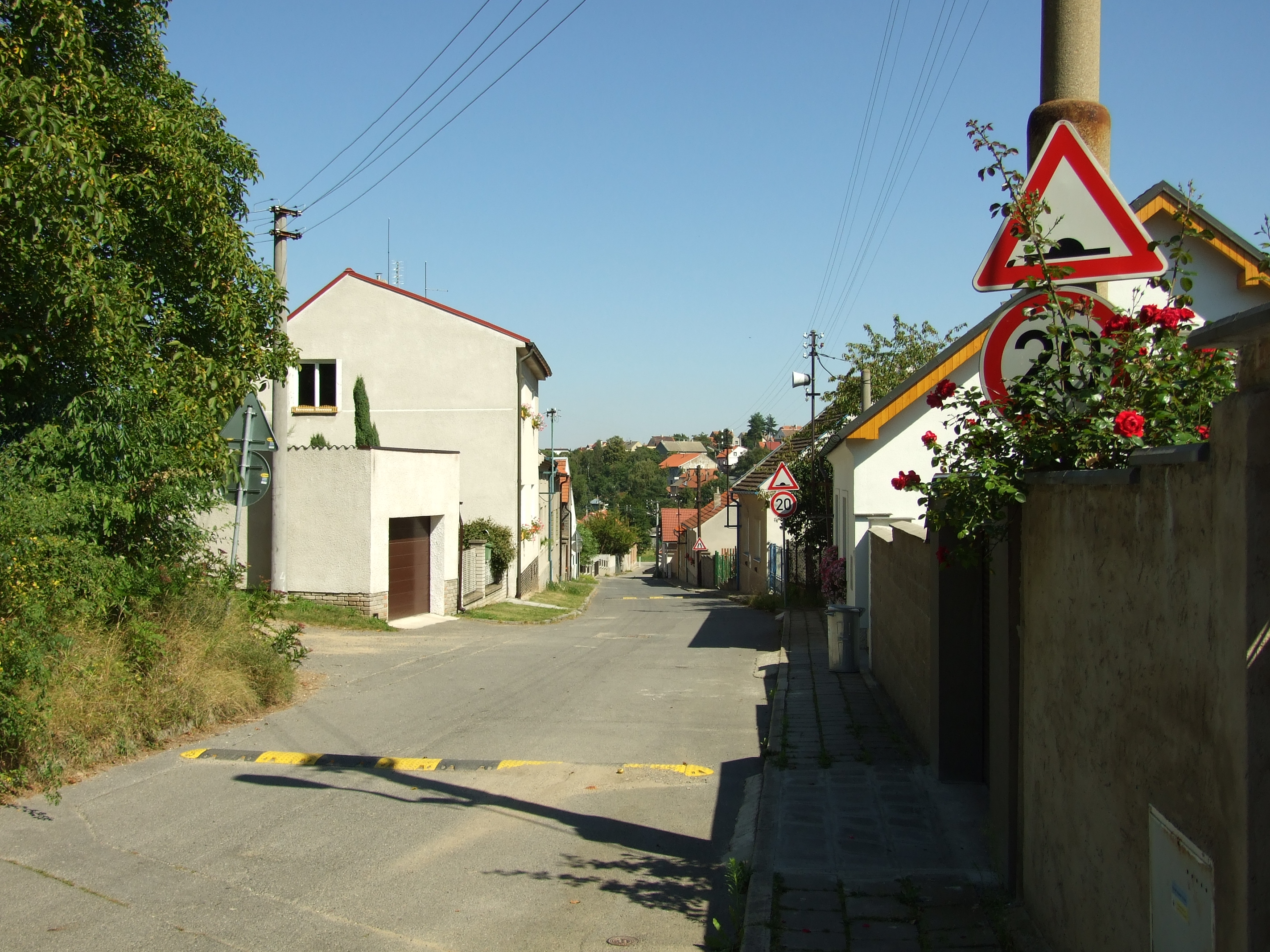
- A road in Hradečno

- Location in the Czech Republic
- Coordinates: 50°11′18″N 13°59′29″E
- Country: Czech Republic
- Region: Central Bohemian
- District: Kladno
- First mentioned: 1523

Area
  - Total: 6.84 km^{2} (2.64 sq mi)
- Elevation: 275 m (902 ft)

Population (2026-01-01)
  - Total: 562
  - Density: 82.2/km^{2} (213/sq mi)
- Time zone: UTC+1 (CET)
  - Summer (DST): UTC+2 (CEST)
- Postal code: 273 04
- Website: www.hradecno.cz

Hradečno is a municipality and village in Kladno District in the Central Bohemian Region of the Czech Republic. It has about 600 inhabitants.

== Administrative division ==
Hradečno consists of three municipal parts (in brackets population according to the 2021 census):

- Hradečno (153)
- Nová Studnice (103)
- Nová Ves (246)

== Demographics ==
Historical population
Year	Pop.	±%
1869	376	—
1880	364	−3.2%
1890	339	−6.9%
1900	435	+28.3%
1910	604	+38.9%
1921	574	−5.0%
1930	507	−11.7%
1950	521	+2.8%
1961	563	+8.1%
1970	542	−3.7%
1980	483	−10.9%
1991	436	−9.7%
2001	425	−2.5%
2011	497	+16.9%
2021	502	+1.0%
Source: Censuses
