= Hodětín =

- Municipality
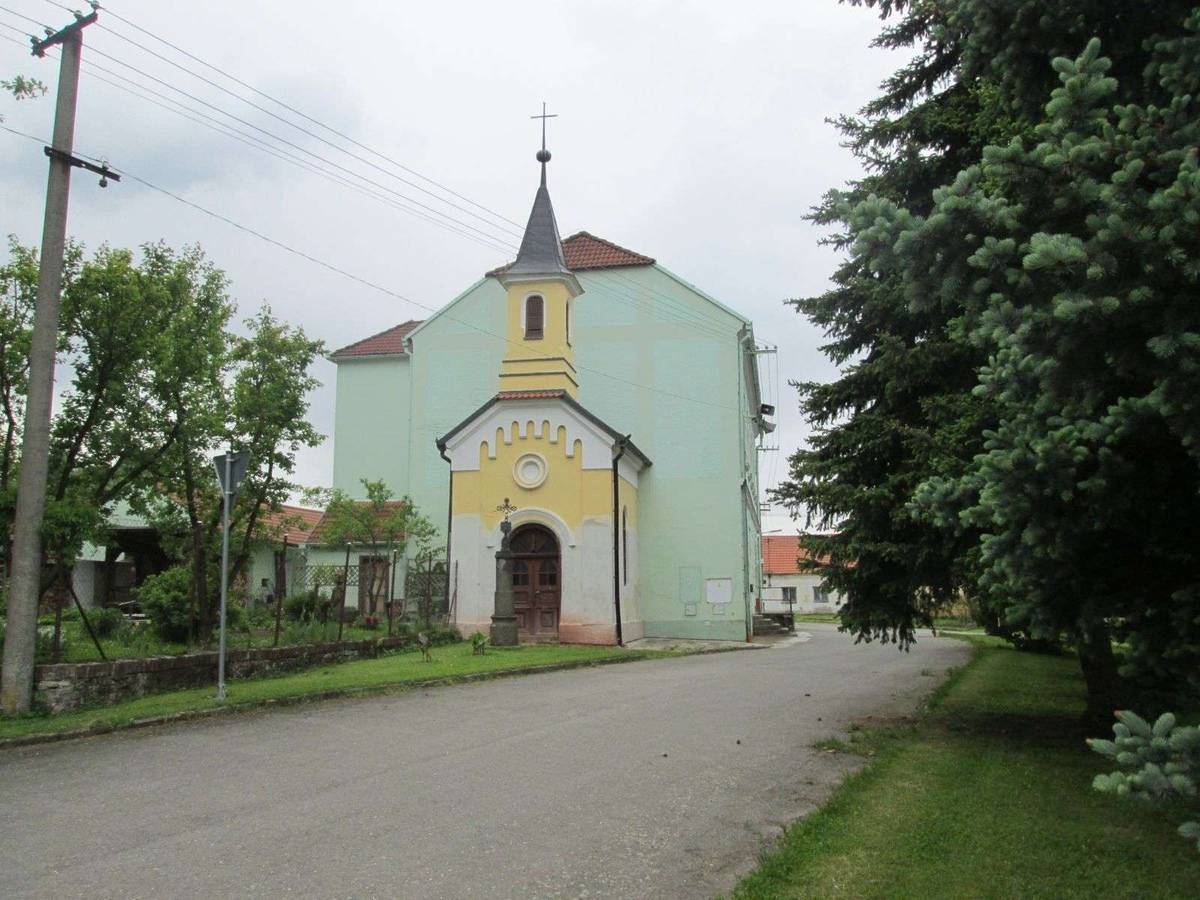
- Chapel in Hodětín

- Location in the Czech Republic
- Coordinates: 49°15′8″N 14°32′55″E
- Country: Czech Republic
- Region: South Bohemian
- District: Tábor
- First mentioned: 1521

Area
  - Total: 18.87 km^{2} (7.29 sq mi)
- Elevation: 455 m (1,493 ft)

Population (2026-01-01)
  - Total: 90
  - Density: 4.8/km^{2} (12/sq mi)
- Time zone: UTC+1 (CET)
  - Summer (DST): UTC+2 (CEST)
- Postal code: 391 65
- Website: www.hodetin.cz

Hodětín is a municipality and village in Tábor District in the South Bohemian Region of the Czech Republic. It has about 90 inhabitants.

Hodětín lies approximately 20 kilometres (12 mi) south of Tábor, 31 km (19 mi) north of České Budějovice, and 94 km (58 mi) south of Prague.

== Administrative division ==
Hodětín consists of three municipal parts (in brackets population according to the 2021 census):

- Hodětín (57)
- Blatec (19)
- Nová Ves (19)

== Demographics ==
Historical population
Year	Pop.	±%
1869	475	—
1880	449	−5.5%
1890	399	−11.1%
1900	414	+3.8%
1910	412	−0.5%
1921	420	+1.9%
1930	416	−1.0%
1950	255	−38.7%
1961	270	+5.9%
1970	193	−28.5%
1980	158	−18.1%
1991	113	−28.5%
2001	81	−28.3%
2011	86	+6.2%
2021	95	+10.5%
Source: Censuses
