= Černovický potok =

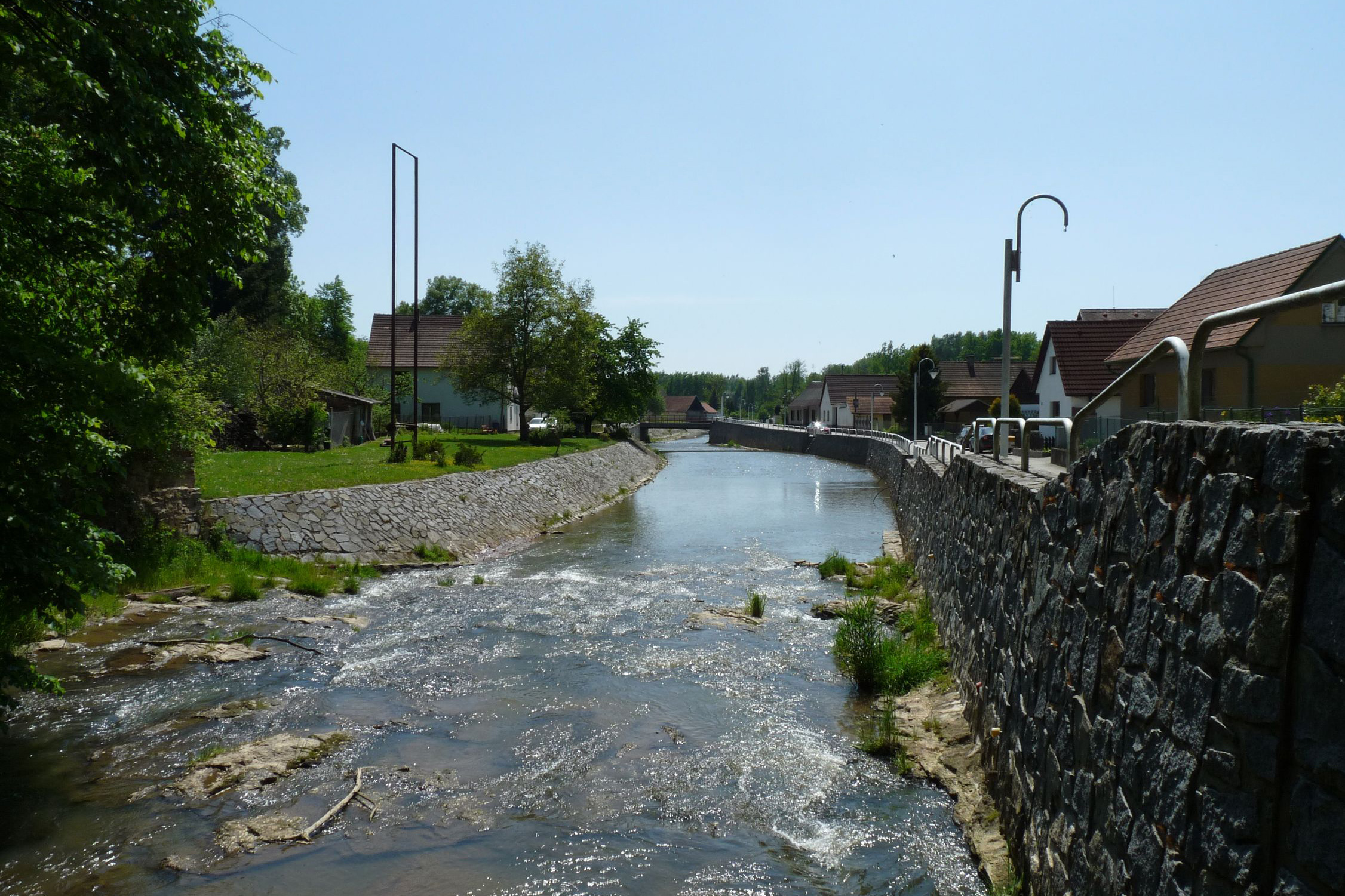
- The Černovický potok in Budislav

Location
- Country: Czech Republic
- Regions: South Bohemian; Vysočina

Physical characteristics
- Source
  - location: Lidmaň, Křemešník Highlands
  - coordinates: 49°23′10″N 15°0′23″E
  - elevation: 661 m (2,169 ft)
- Mouth
  - location: Lužnice
  - coordinates: 49°15′27″N 14°42′52″E
  - elevation: 400 m (1,300 ft)
- Length: 40.3 km (25.0 mi)
- Basin size: 137.1 km^{2} (52.9 sq mi)
- Discharge
  - average: 0.79 m^{3}/s (28 cu ft/s) near estuary

Basin features
- Progression: Lužnice→ Vltava→ Elbe→ North Sea

The Černovický potok is a stream in the Czech Republic, a right tributary of the Lužnice River. It flows through the South Bohemian and Vysočina regions. It is 40.3 km (25.0 mi) long.

== Etymology ==
The name means 'Černovice stream' in Czech, referring to a town on the upper course of the stream.

== Characteristic ==
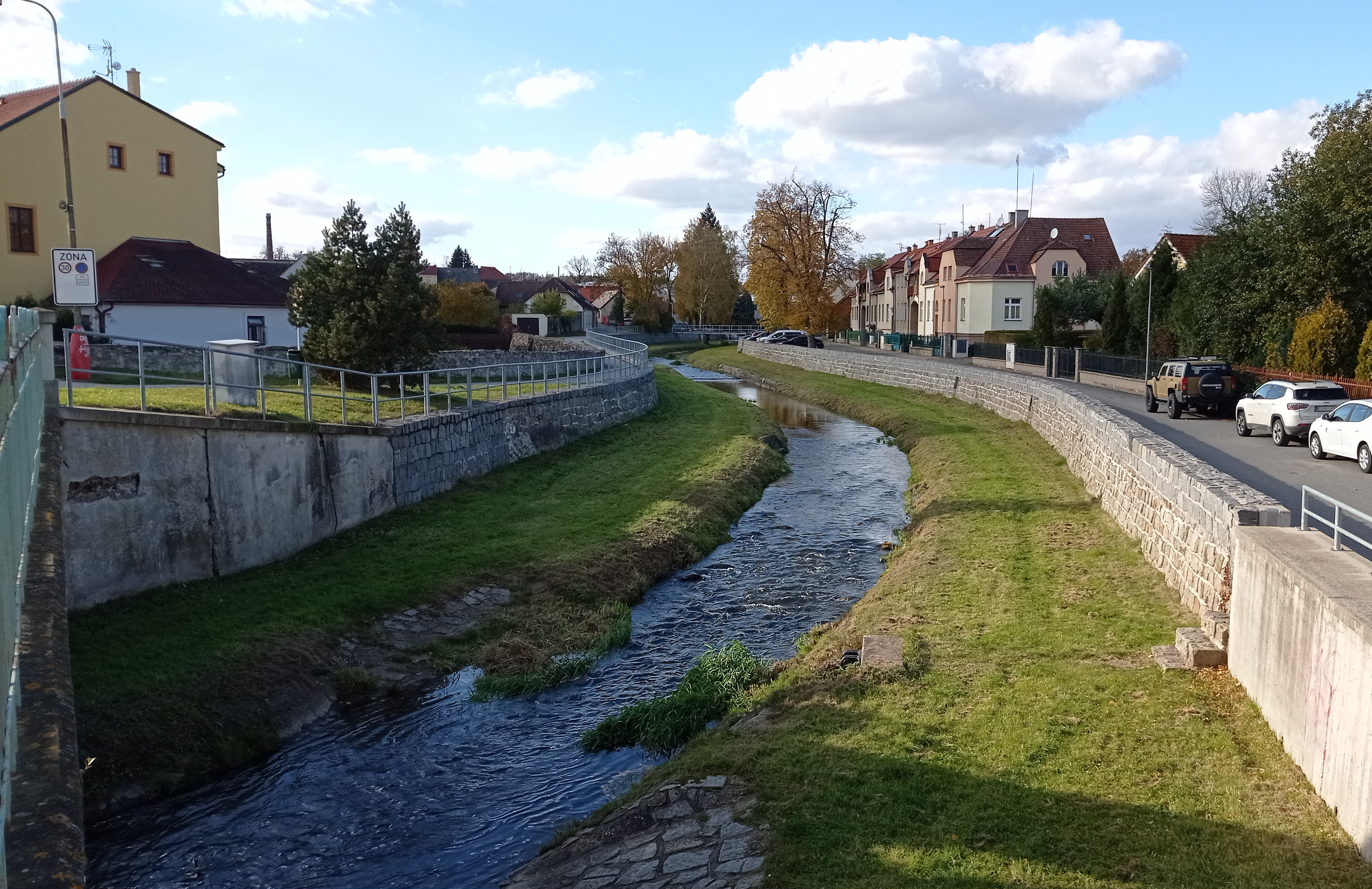
The Černovický potok in Soběslav

The Černovický potok originates in the territory of Lidmaň in the Křemešník Highlands at an elevation of 661 m (2,169 ft) and flows to Soběslav, where it enters the Lužnice River at an elevation of 400 m (1,300 ft). It is 40.3 km (25.0 mi) long. Its drainage basin has an area of 125.4 km^{2} (48.4 sq mi).

The longest tributaries of the Černovický potok are:

Tributary	Length (km)	Side
Katovský potok	6.9	left
Vlčeveský potok	5.8	right
Hojovický potok	5.6	left

== Course ==
The stream flows through the municipal territories of Lidmaň, Černovice, Vlčeves, Hojovice, Mlýny, Psárov, Choustník, Budislav, Tučapy, Zvěrotice, Sedlečko u Soběslavě, Klenovice and Soběslav.

== Bodies of water ==
There are 162 bodies of water in the basin area. The largest of them is the fishpond Pokoj with an area of 26.4 ha (65 acres), built directly on the Černovický potok. The stream also supplies several other small fishponds.

== See also ==
- List of rivers of the Czech Republic
