= Bohutín =

Bohutín may refer to places in the Czech Republic:

- Bohutín (Příbram District), a municipality and village in the Central Bohemian Region
- Bohutín (Šumperk District), a municipality and village in the Olomouc Region
- Bohutín, a village and part of Lidmaň in the Vysočina Region
