= Soběslav (given name) =

Soběslav is a Czech masculine given name. It means 'having own glory', 'glorious to himself'. It is a cognate of the Polish name Sobiesław. The feminine form of the name is Soběslava. Notable people with the name include:

- Jan Soběslav of Moravia (c. 1357 – c. 1380), feudal lord in Moravia
- Soběslav (died 1004), Bohemian nobleman
- Soběslav I, Duke of Bohemia (c. 1075 – 1140)
- Soběslav II, Duke of Bohemia (c. 1128 – 1180)
- Soběslav Pinkas (1827–1901), Czech painter

== See also ==
- Soběslav, a town in the Czech Republic
