= Bohdalín =

- Municipality
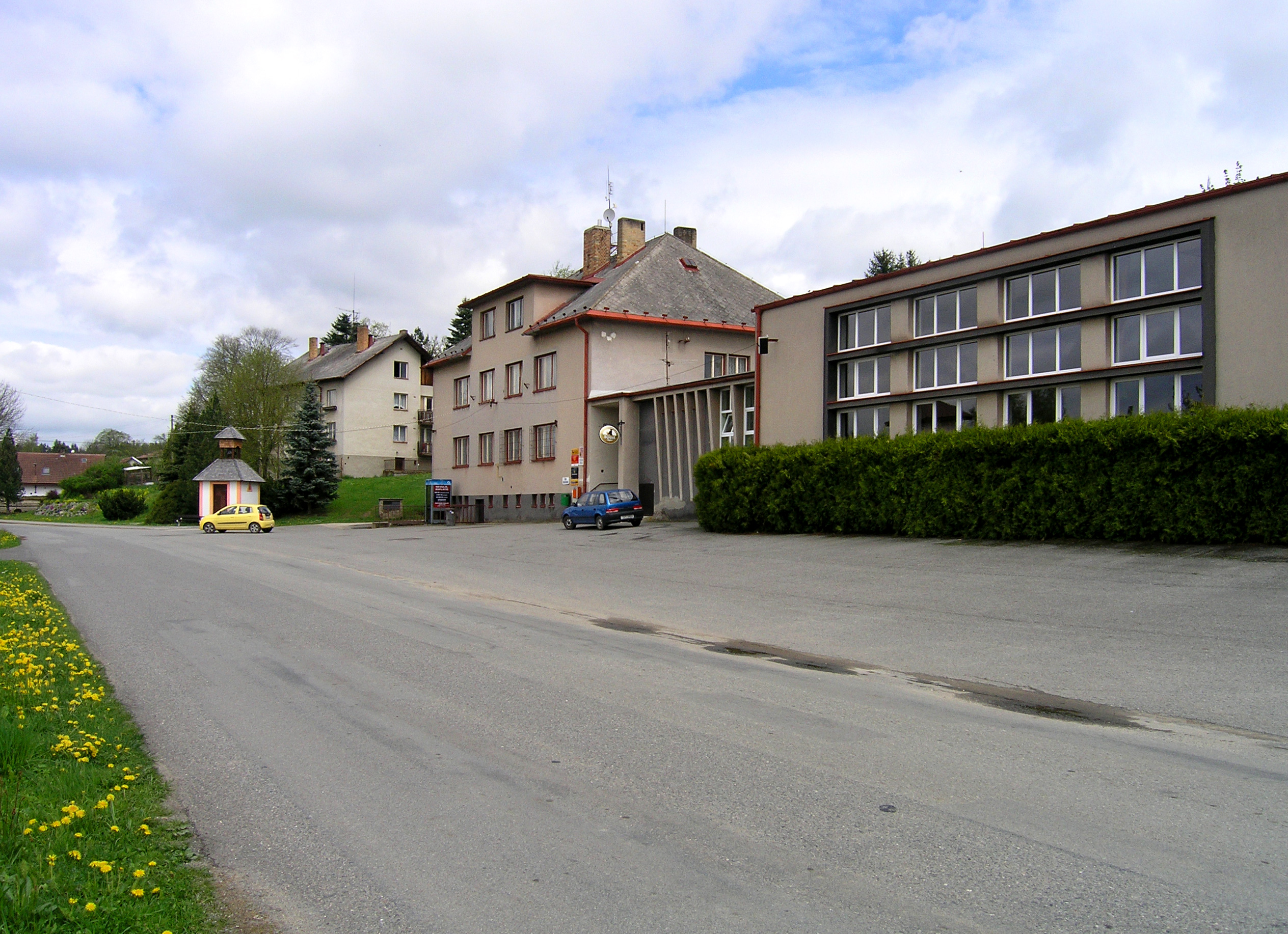
- Municipal office

- Flag Coat of arms

- Location in the Czech Republic
- Coordinates: 49°18′28″N 15°0′57″E
- Country: Czech Republic
- Region: Vysočina
- District: Pelhřimov
- First mentioned: 1379

Area
  - Total: 7.74 km^{2} (2.99 sq mi)
- Elevation: 598 m (1,962 ft)

Population (2026-01-01)
  - Total: 187
  - Density: 24.2/km^{2} (62.6/sq mi)
- Time zone: UTC+1 (CET)
  - Summer (DST): UTC+2 (CEST)
- Postal code: 394 91
- Website: www.bohdalin.cz

Bohdalín is a municipality and village in Pelhřimov District in the Vysočina Region of the Czech Republic. It has about 200 inhabitants.

== Etymology ==
The name Bohdalín is derived from the surname Bohdal. The village was founded on a field that belonged to Bohdal and initially was called Bohdalovo pole (literally 'Bohdal's field'), but the name was soon abbreviated to its present form.

== Geography ==
Bohdalín is located about 20 kilometres (12 mi) southwest of Pelhřimov and 42 km (26 mi) west of Jihlava. It lies in the Křemešník Highlands. The highest point is at 647 m (2,123 ft) above sea level. The stream Bohdalínský potok flows through the municipality and supplies here a set of small fishponds.

== History ==
The first mention of Bohdalín is in the land register of the Rosenberg family from 1379. In 1610, Bohdalín was acquired by Václav Vencelík of Vrchoviště, but his properties were confiscated in 1620 as a result of the Battle of White Mountain. Bohdalín belonged to the estate that was purchased by foreign nobleman Jindřich Paradys of Eskaide in 1623. After the death of Jindřich Paradys, the estate was divided and Bohdalín became a part of the Černovice estate, which was inherited by the Talmberk family. In 1680, the village was hit by a plague epidemic.

== Demographics ==
Historical population

Year	Pop.	±%
1869	457	—
1880	491	+7.4%
1890	482	−1.8%
1900	540	+12.0%
1910	540	+0.0%

Year	Pop.	±%
1921	514	−4.8%
1930	447	−13.0%
1950	311	−30.4%
1961	321	+3.2%
1970	290	−9.7%

Year	Pop.	±%
1980	279	−3.8%
1991	229	−17.9%
2001	228	−0.4%
2011	190	−16.7%
2021	170	−10.5%

Source: Censuses

== Transport ==
There are no major roads passing through Bohdalín. The railway that runs through the municipality is unused.

== Sights ==
There are no protected cultural monuments in the municipality.
