= Sabinov =

- Municipality
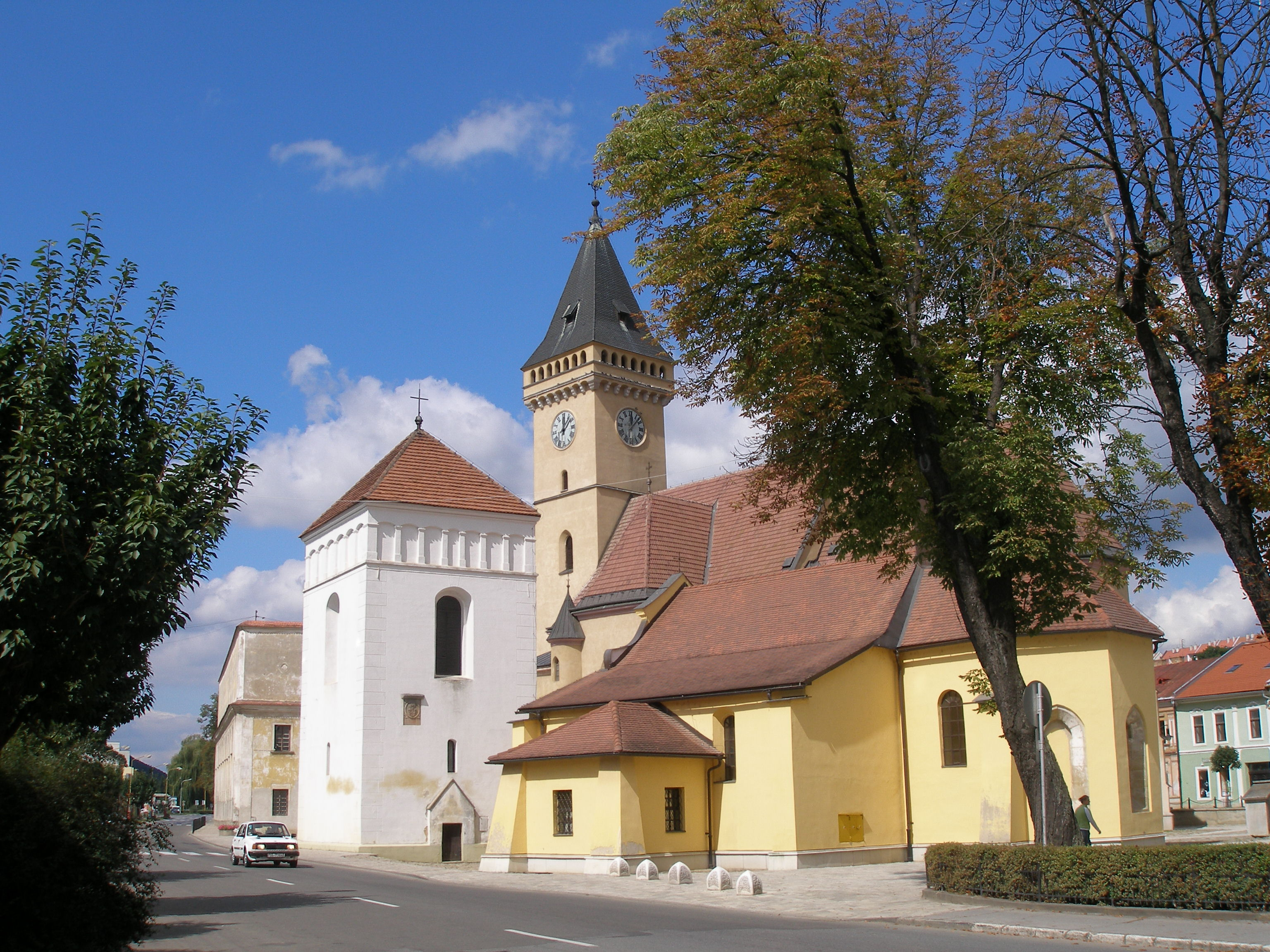

- Flag Coat of arms
- Interactive map of Sabinov
- Coordinates: 49.11°N 21.09°E
- Country: Slovakia
- Region: Prešov Region
- District: Sabinov District
- First mentioned: 1248

Government
  - Mayor: Peter Molčan

Area
  - Total: 23.83 km^{2} (9.20 sq mi)
- Elevation: 333 m (1,093 ft)

Population (2025)
  - Total: 11,981
- Time zone: UTC+1 (CET)
  - Summer (DST): UTC+2 (CEST)
- Postal code: 830 1
- Area code: +421 51
- Vehicle registration plate (until 2022): SB
- Website: www.sabinov.sk

Sabinov (Latin: Сibinium, Hungarian: Kisszeben, German: Zeben) is a small town located in the Prešov Region (north-eastern Slovakia), approximately 20 km from Prešov and 55 km from Košice. The population of Sabinov is 12,700.

== Geography ==
The municipality lies at an altitude of 333 metres (1,093 ft) and covers an area of 23.83 km^{2} (9.20 sq mi) (2025).

== Etymology ==
The name apparently comes from some shortened Slavic personal name, e.g. Soba, Sobin, Sobina (probably a short form of Soběslav). In Poland, there are documented personal names Soba, Zoba, Sobien (Soben or Sobin), Sobon (Soboń) and medieval village names Szebne, Szobniow. In the Czech Republic, Sobyn, Sobień, Soběn and medieval village names Sobyenow, Sobíňov, Soběnov. The theory about the origin in a personal name is supported also by the common Slavic possessive suffix -ov preserved in later documents. The names Zob, Zoba, Zobas were used also in the Kingdom of Hungary in the 12th-13th century, but they may not be related to Soběslav and could be also of Hungarian origin.

As legend has it, the name derives from the daughter of the landlord of Tharkveley called Szabina who would have been the wife of Andrew II of Hungary, and the king built the city in remembrance of her.

1299 Scibinio, 1471 Sabinov, 1518 Kiss Zeben.

== History ==
The first written record about Sabinov is from the year 1248 (Sceben). Sabinov was initially a Slovak village until German settlers (more specifically Zipsers) came in the middle of the 13th century. In 1299 Sabinov received municipal privileges, and in 1405 it was declared a free royal town by king Sigismund, Holy Roman Emperor. In the 15th century Sabinov joined the Pentapolitana, an alliance of five towns of northeastern Kingdom of Hungary (Bardejov/Bártfa, Levoča/Lőcse, Košice/Kassa, Prešov/Eperjes and Sabinov/Kisszeben). The 16th and 17th century was the era of Sabinov's development and economic growth followed by the years of recession. In 1740, an important secondary school was established by the Piarists. The history of Sabinov is very similar to the history of other towns in this region.

== Population ==
Historical population
Year	Pop.	±%
1970	6,470	—
1980	7,948	+22.8%
1991	10,657	+34.1%
2001	12,290	+15.3%
2011	12,710	+3.4%
2021	12,349	−2.8%
Source: Censuses

Population statistic (10 years)
Year	1995	2005	2015	2025
Count	11,679	12,378	12,717	11,981
Difference		+5.98%	+2.73%	−5.78%

Population statistic
Year	2024	2025
Count	12,131	11,981
Difference		−1.23%

It has a population of 11,981 people (31 December 2025).

=== Ethnicity ===
Census 2021 (1+ %)
Ethnicity	Number	Fraction
Slovak	11,366	92.03%
Romani	1235	10%
Not found out	628	5.08%
Rusyn	188	1.52%
Total	12,349	

In year 2021 was 12,349 people by ethnicity 11,366 as Slovak, 1235 as Romani, 628 as Not found out, 188 as Rusyn, 51 as Czech, 28 as Ukrainian, 23 as Other, 13 as Polish, 12 as Russian, 6 as Hungarian, 4 as German, 3 as Irish, 3 as Romanian, 3 as English, 2 as Bulgarian, 1 as Jewish, 1 as Italian, 1 as Austrian, 1 as Moravian, 1 as Croatian and 1 as Albanian.

Note on population: The difference values of population numbers in the table "Population statistic" and in the sections "Ethnicity" & "Religion" is caused by the use of various statistical methods.

The town is home to a significant Roma community. In 2019, they constituted an estimated 17% of the local population, or 2115 people, mainly concentrated in two settlements.

=== Religion ===
Census 2021 (1+ %)
Religion	Number	Fraction
Roman Catholic Church	7011	56.77%
None	1576	12.76%
Greek Catholic Church	1163	9.42%
Not found out	673	5.45%
Apostolic Church	572	4.63%
Evangelical Church	514	4.16%
Eastern Orthodox Church	442	3.58%
Jehovah's Witnesses	199	1.61%
Total	12,349	

In year 2021 was 12,349 people by religion 7011 from Roman Catholic Church, 1576 from None, 1163 from Greek Catholic Church, 673 from Not found out, 572 from Apostolic Church, 514 from Evangelical Church, 442 from Eastern Orthodox Church, 199 from Jehovah's Witnesses, 75 from Other and not ascertained christian church, 50 from Christian Congregations in Slovakia, 32 from Ad hoc movements, 10 from Other, 8 from Church of the Brethren, 6 from Paganism and natural spirituality, 5 from United Methodist Church, 5 from Buddhism, 3 from Baptists Church, 2 from Jewish community, 1 from Calvinist Church, 1 from Hinduism and 1 from Seventh-day Adventist Church.

=== Historical ===
According to the 1880 census, the town had 2,825 inhabitants, 2,088 Slovaks (73.9%), 245 Hungarians (8.7%), 412 Germans (14.6%) and others.

According to the 1910 census, the town had 3,288 inhabitants, 1,640 Slovaks (49.9%), 1,168 Hungarians (35.5%), 341 Germans (10.4%), 120 Romanians (3.6%), and others.

According to the 2001 census, the town had 12,290 inhabitants. 90.62% of inhabitants were Slovaks, 6.40% Roma, 0.48% Czechs, and 0.14% Rusyns. Most of the Hungarians and Carpathian-Germans were expelled after World War II and their houses confiscated in the "Slovakization" of Sabinov. The religious makeup was 70.48% Roman Catholics, 10.53% Greek Catholics, 5.14% people with no religious affiliation and 4.16% Lutherans.

== The Shop on Main Street ==
The acclaimed Czechoslovak film, The Shop on Main Street, which was shot in Sabinov during 1964, was awarded the Academy Award for Best Foreign Language Film (of 1965) in Santa Monica, California in 1966. In 1967 the film's lead actress, Ida Kamińska, was nominated for the Best Actress in a Leading Role for her screen work in this motion picture. She and the lead actor, Jozef Kroner, were also honored at the Cannes Film Festival in France for their roles in the film.

== Notable people ==
- Károly Wagner (1732–1790), Hungarian historian, priest and teacher
- Ede Bartsch (1796–1871), Hungarian physician
- Bohuš Nosák-Nezabudov (1818–1877), poet, writer, journalist, member of Ľudovít Štúr's group
- Illés Trangus (Sabinov, 1704 – Miskolc, 1761) physician
- Tivadar Csontváry Kosztka (1853–1919), famous painter, born in Sabinov
- Pavol Peter Gojdič (1888–1960), Greek Catholic bishop, since 1917 worked in Sabinov as an assistant parish priest; in 2001 was beatified by Pope John-Paul II.
- Anton Prídavok (1904–1945), poet, writer, playwright, director
- Leslie Lawrance Foldy(1919–2001) was a theoretical physicist,

== Twin towns — sister cities ==
Sabinov is twinned with:

- Çubuk, Turkey
- Kenderes, Hungary
- Siedlce, Poland
- Soběslav, Czech Republic
