= Illés Trangus =

Hungarian physician

- Born: 1704; Kisszeben, Kingdom of Hungary
- Died: 11 December 1761 (aged 56–57); Miskolc, Kingdom of Hungary

Illés Trangus (Slovak: Eliáš Trangus, about 1704 – 11 December 1761) was a Hungarian physician, pharmacy owner, first chief physician (Hungarian: főorvos) of Gömör and Borsod County.

== Life ==
As the son of Illés Trangus Sr. (1669–1737), a lutheran pastor, and Zsuzsanna Katalin Alauda (1676–1733), he was probably born in Bardejov (Hungarian: Bártfa) since his parents lived there at that time but was raised in Sabinov (Hungarian: Kisszeben), and declared himself a Hungarian from Szeben, or Cibinio-Hungarian in Latin. Between 1728 and 1731, he completed his studies at Halle University (today: Martin Luther University), and in his dissertation he discussed the healing of the rich.

His first wife was Judit Kruss (1712–1741), his second wife was Erzsébet Mária Raymann (1718–1764), the daughter of János Ádám Raymann, a doctor from Prešov (Hungarian: Eperjes). He first lived in Rožňava (Hungarian: Rozsnyó), and in the early 1730s he settled in Miskolc, where he founded the Arany Szarvas (Golden Deer) Pharmacy and opened a medical practice.

Later his son, Mihály Teofil Gottlieb Trangus became a physician too.

== Works ==
- Dissertatio inauguralis medica de sanatione divitum difficili, quam auspice Deo Propitio Ex Consensu atque Auctoritate Gratiosa Facultatis Medicae in Alma Regia Fridericiana Praeside DN. D. Michaele Alberti Sacr[ae] Maj[estati] Reg[iae] Boruss[icae] Aulico et Consist. Magdeb. Consiliario, med. et philos. natur. professore publ. ordin. etc. decano H. T. spectatissimo Domino Patrono ac Promotore suo omni honoris cultu prosequando pro licentia summisque in medicina honoribus et privilegiis doctoralibus legitime impterandis hotis locoque consuetis Anno MDCCXXXI D. Septembr. publicae ac placidae eruditorum ventilationi subjiciet. Halae Magdeburgicae. 1731.
