= Mlýny =

- Municipality
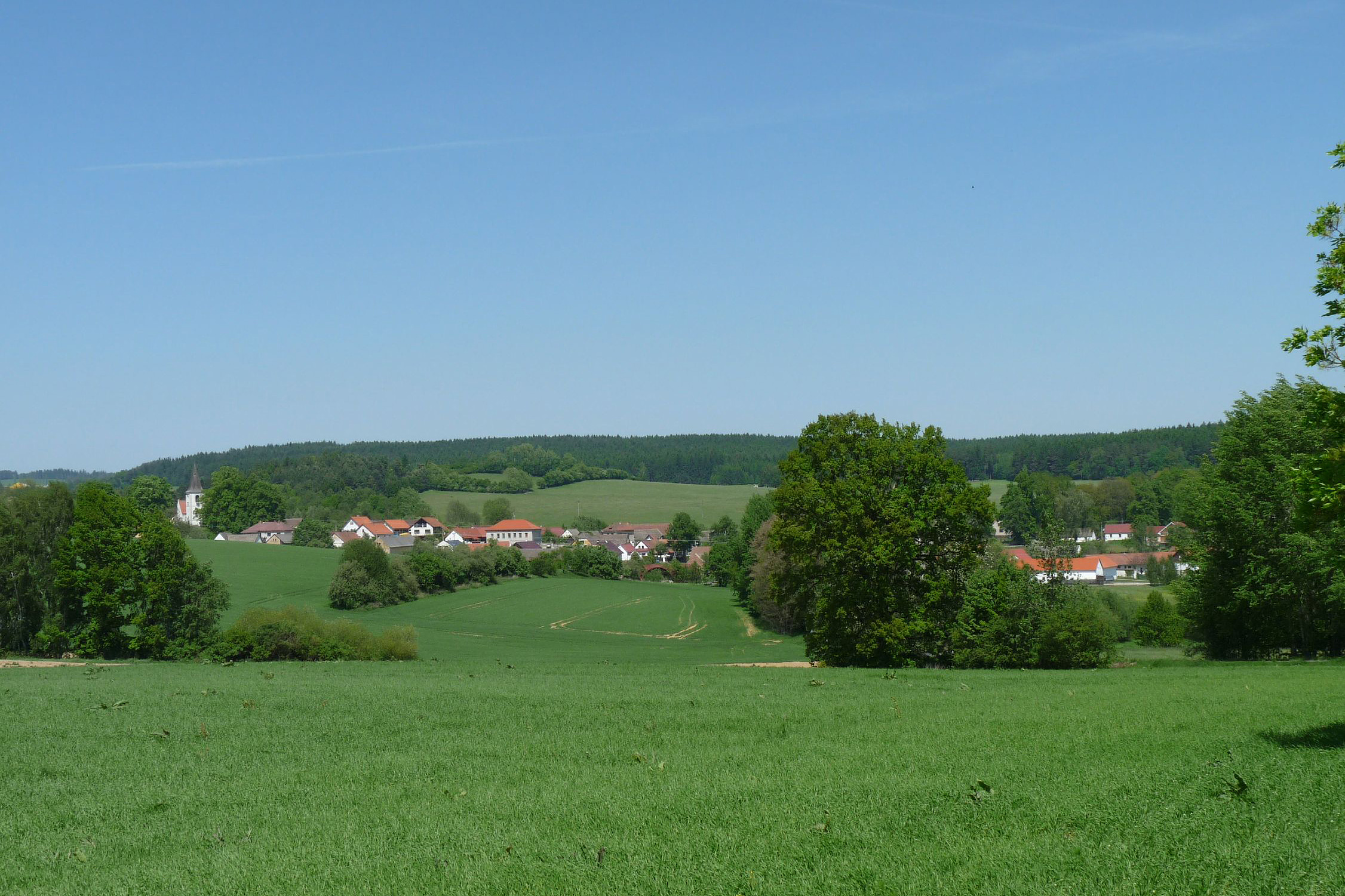
- View from the south

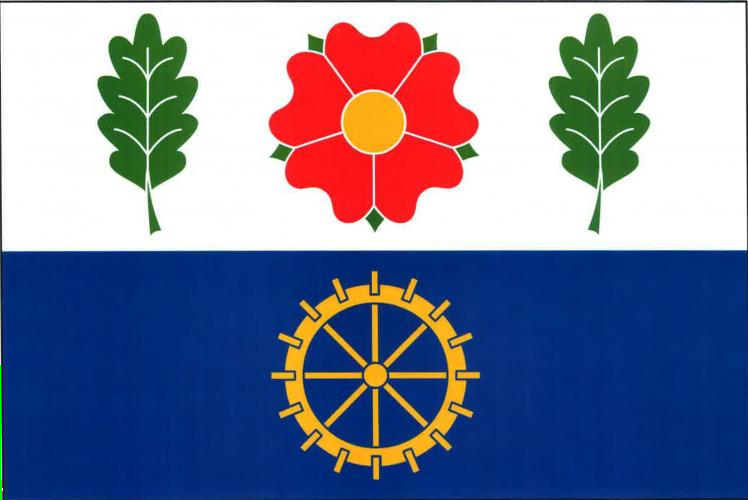
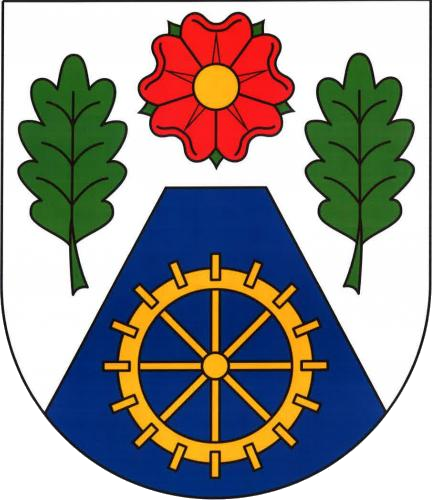
- Flag Coat of arms

- Location in the Czech Republic
- Coordinates: 49°20′11″N 14°52′37″E
- Country: Czech Republic
- Region: South Bohemian
- District: Tábor
- First mentioned: 1379

Area
  - Total: 7.70 km^{2} (2.97 sq mi)
- Elevation: 515 m (1,690 ft)

Population (2026-01-01)
  - Total: 119
  - Density: 15.5/km^{2} (40.0/sq mi)
- Time zone: UTC+1 (CET)
  - Summer (DST): UTC+2 (CEST)
- Postal code: 392 01
- Website: www.obecmlyny.cz

Mlýny (German: Mühlen) is a municipality and village in Tábor District in the South Bohemian Region of the Czech Republic. It has about 100 inhabitants.

== Etymology ==
The name means 'mills' in Czech.

== Geography ==
Mlýny is located about 16 kilometres (10 mi) southeast of Tábor and 49 km (30 mi) northeast of České Budějovice. It lies in the Křemešník Highlands. The highest point is a nameless hill at 604 m (1,982 ft) above sea level. The stream Černovický potok flows through the municipality.

== History ==
The first written mention of Mlýny is from 1379. The village belonged to the Choustník estate and shared its owners and destinies.

== Demographics ==
Historical population

| Year | Pop. | ±% |
|---|---|---|
| 1869 | 398 | — |
| 1880 | 383 | −3.8% |
| 1890 | 419 | +9.4% |
| 1900 | 354 | −15.5% |
| 1910 | 365 | +3.1% |

| Year | Pop. | ±% |
|---|---|---|
| 1921 | 328 | −10.1% |
| 1930 | 323 | −1.5% |
| 1950 | 215 | −33.4% |
| 1961 | 219 | +1.9% |
| 1970 | 186 | −15.1% |

| Year | Pop. | ±% |
|---|---|---|
| 1980 | 143 | −23.1% |
| 1991 | 150 | +4.9% |
| 2001 | 151 | +0.7% |
| 2011 | 149 | −1.3% |
| 2021 | 120 | −19.5% |

Source: Censuses

== Transport ==
There are no railways or major roads passing through the municipality.

== Sights ==
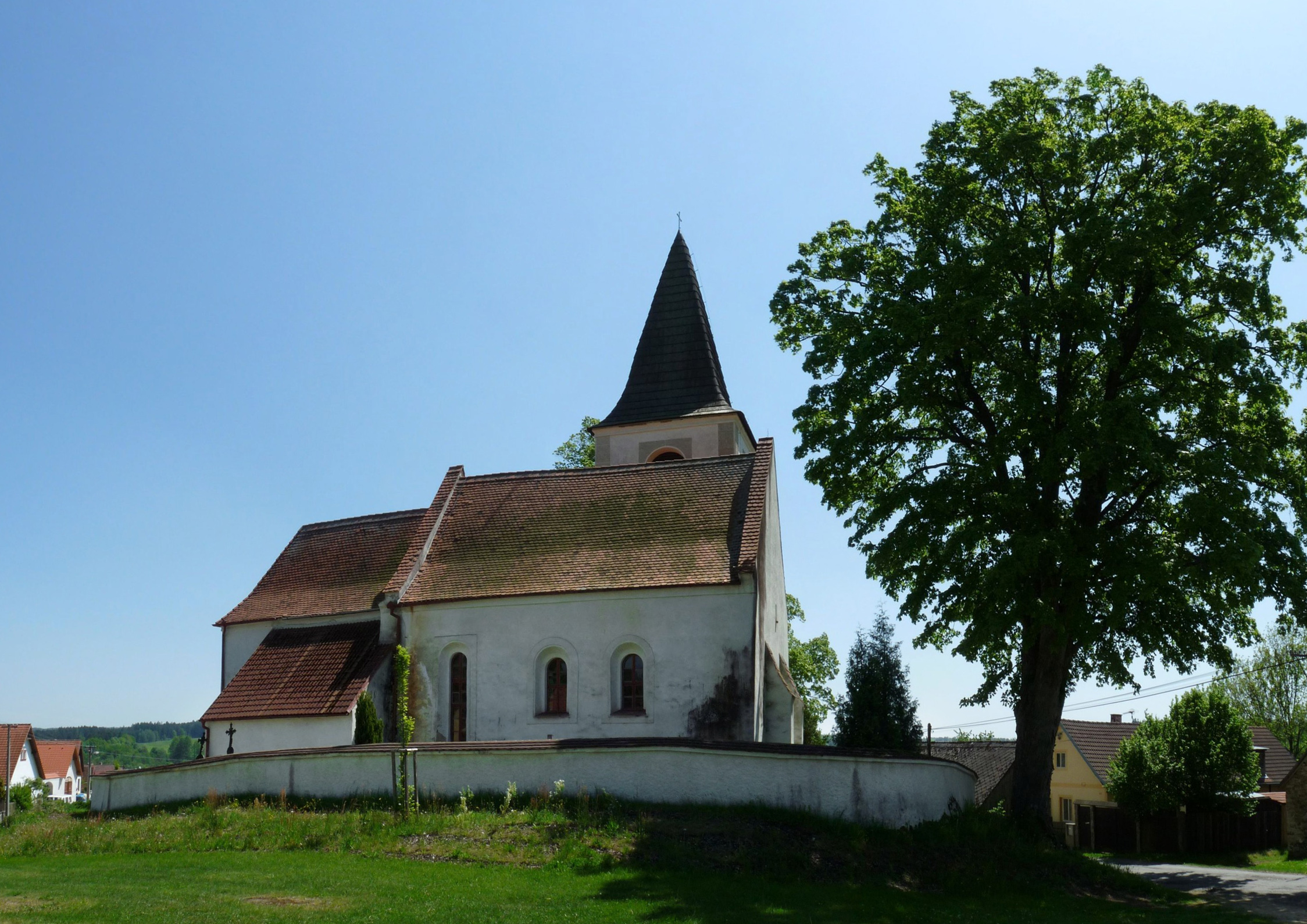
Church of Saint Catherine

The main landmark of Mlýny is the Church of Saint Catherine. Originally a Gothic church from the mid-14th century, it was rebuilt in 1609. In 1957, it was reconstructed and modified to its present form.
