= Soběslav Pinkas =

Czech painter

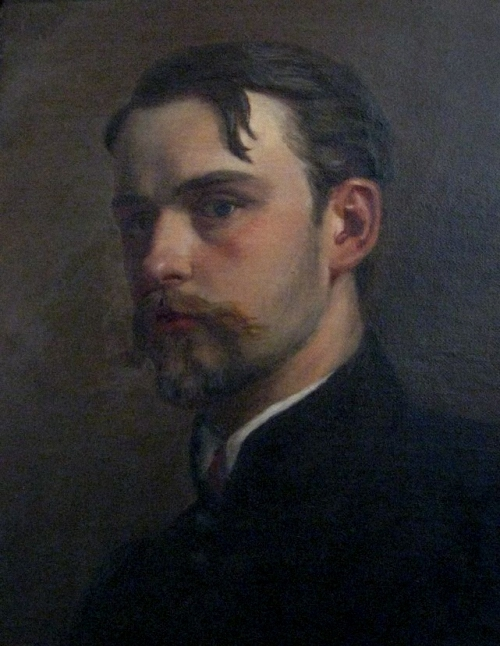
Self-portrait (1853)

Soběslav Pinkas, originally Hippolyt Karel Maria František Pinkas (7 October 1827, Prague - 30 December 1901, Prague) was a Czech genre painter and political caricaturist.

== Biography ==
His father, Adolf Maria Pinkas, was a politician and, later, a leading figure in the Revolutions of 1848. After completing his basic education, he studied law. At that time, he changed his name to "Soběslav" to show his support for Czech nationalism. He is believed to have been among the group of students that held Count Leopold von Thun hostage during the June Uprising.

In 1849, after the revolution was suppressed, he found it necessary to change careers and enrolled at the Academy of Fine Arts where he worked in the studios of Christian Ruben. On the advice of Josef Mánes, he transferred to the Academy of Fine Arts, Munich, but stayed for only two months before taking private lessons from Johann Baptist Berdellé. In 1854, he received a scholarship to study in France, where he worked in the studios of Thomas Couture. While there, he exhibited at the Salon, got married, and came under the influence of Jean-François Millet. He also was a frequent visitor to the art colony in Bourron-Marlotte.

He returned to Bohemia after his father's death in 1865 to look after his family. Later, he accepted a position as a drawing teacher, which he held for twenty-five years. He also taught courses for women at the Academy's graduate school and participated in planning the National Theater. Throughout his later years, he maintained his contacts with France; working for the Alliance Française and contributing to publications such as Le Siècle and Le Soleil. In 1885, he built a cottage in Sázava, where he had been impressed by the scenery. Four years after his death, the actor George Voskovec, his grandson, was born at that cottage.

== Selected paintings ==
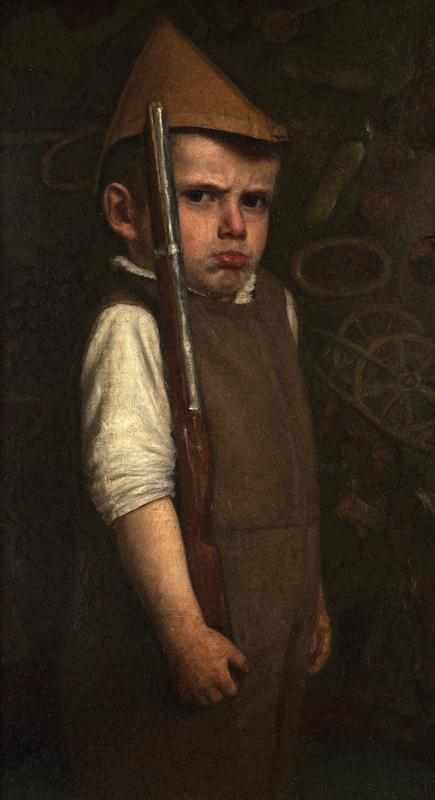
Boy with a Gun

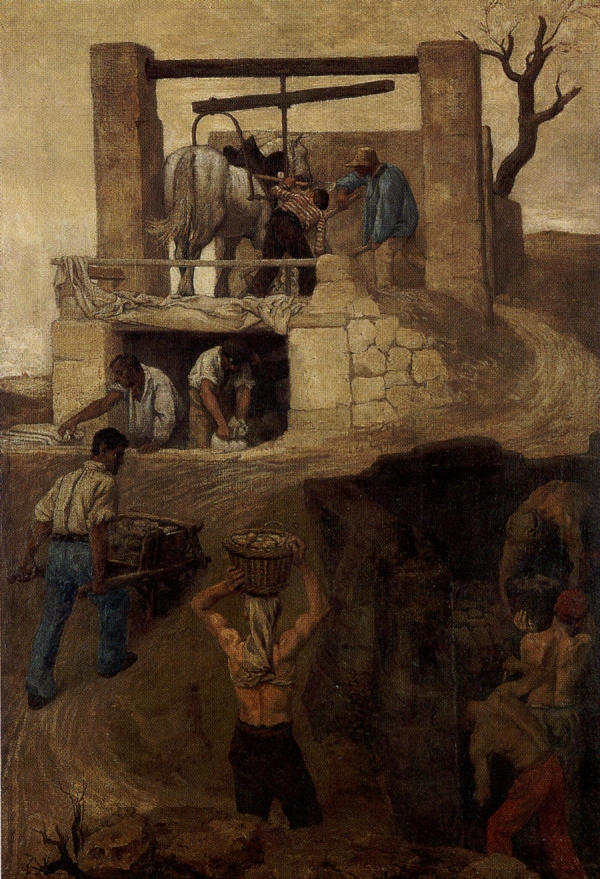
Workers on Montmartre

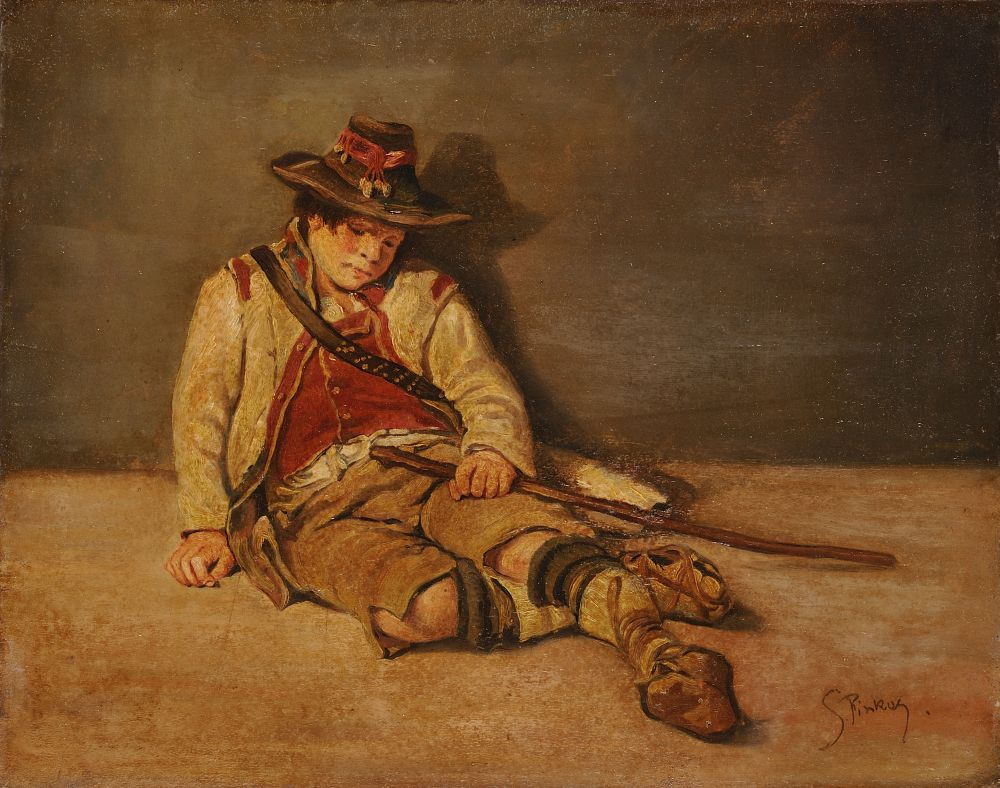
Resting Herdsman

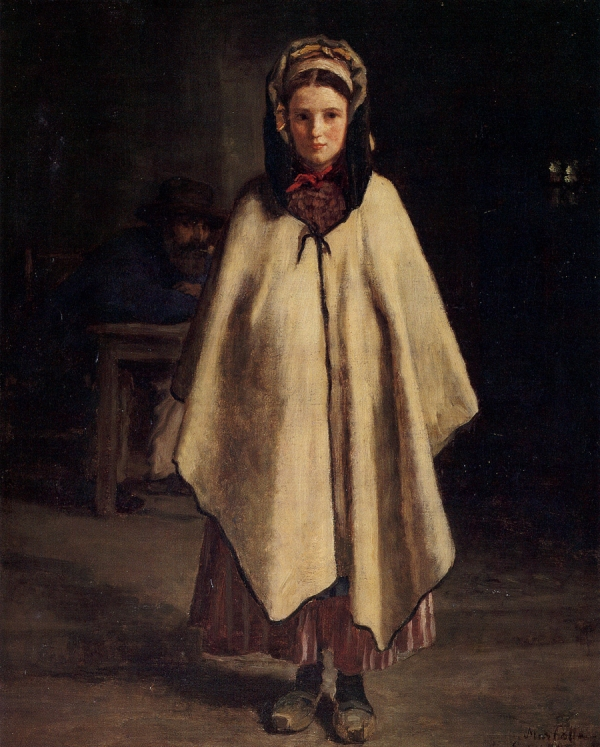
Shepherdess from Marlotte

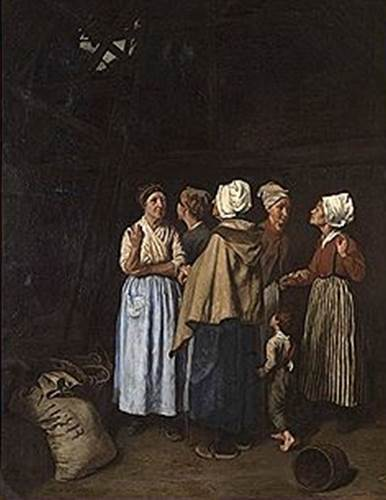
Prayer for a Hanged Man
