= Soběslav =

- Town
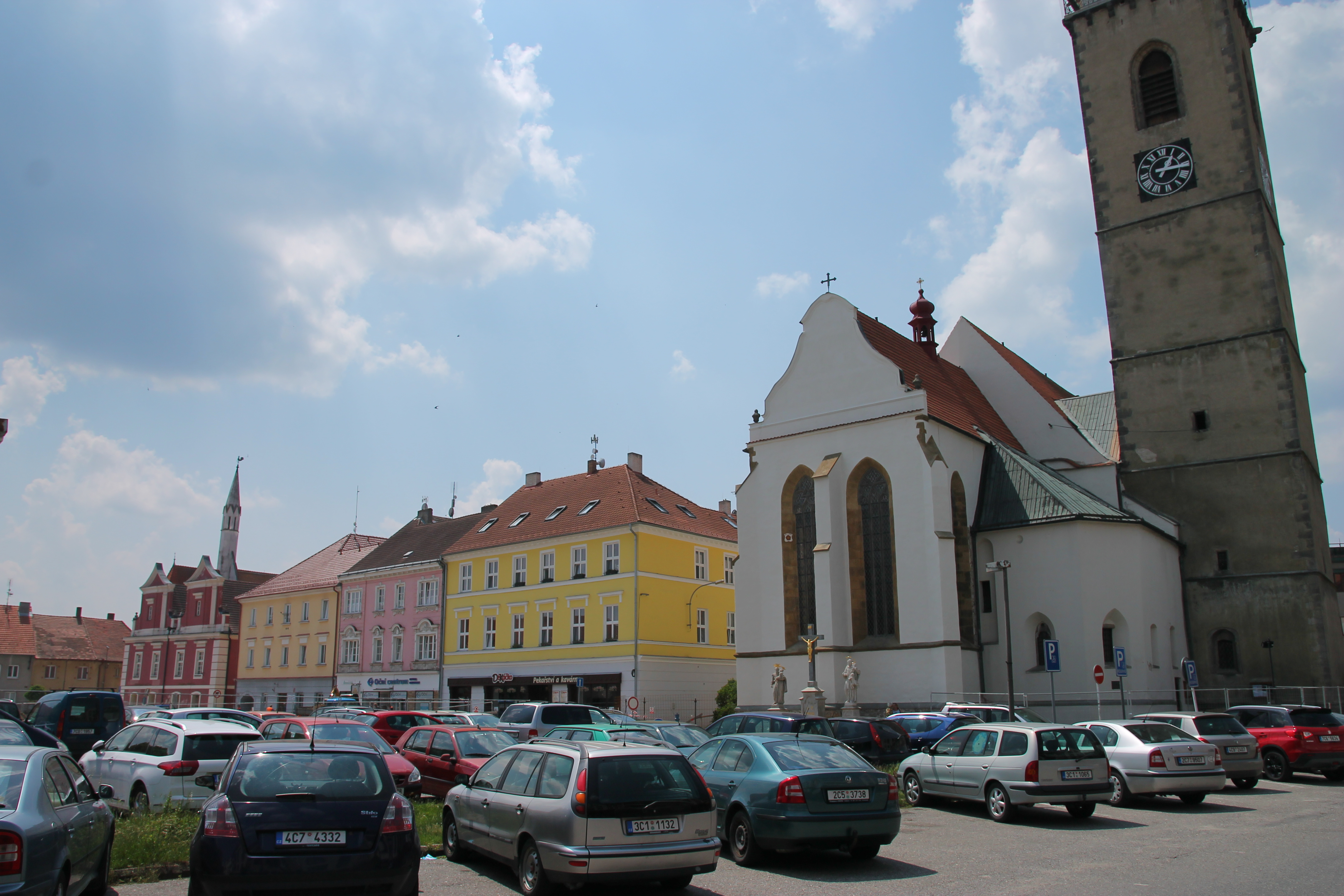
- The square Náměstí Republiky with the Church of Saints Peter and Paul

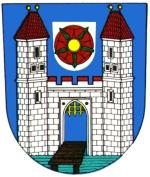
- Flag Coat of arms

- Location in the Czech Republic
- Coordinates: 49°15′36″N 14°43′7″E
- Country: Czech Republic
- Region: South Bohemian
- District: Tábor
- First mentioned: 1293

Government
  - Mayor: Jindřich Bláha (ODS)

Area
  - Total: 20.00 km^{2} (7.72 sq mi)
- Elevation: 405 m (1,329 ft)

Population (2026-01-01)
  - Total: 6,979
  - Density: 349.0/km^{2} (903.8/sq mi)
- Time zone: UTC+1 (CET)
  - Summer (DST): UTC+2 (CEST)
- Postal code: 392 17
- Website: www.musobeslav.cz

Soběslav (Czech pronunciation: [ˈsobjɛslaf]; German: Sobieslau) is a town in Tábor District in the South Bohemian Region of the Czech Republic. It has about 7,000 inhabitants. The town is located at the confluence of the river Lužnice and the stream Černovický potok, on the border between the Třeboň Basin and Tábor Uplands.

Soběslav became a town in 1390. The historic town centre is well preserved and is protected as an urban monument zone. Among the most important monuments are the Church of Saints Peter and Paul and the Soběslav Castle.

== Administrative division ==
Soběslav consists of five municipal parts (in brackets population according to the 2021 census):

- Soběslav I (964)
- Soběslav II (1,779)
- Soběslav III (3,767)
- Chlebov (190)
- Nedvědice (101)

== Etymology ==
The name is derived from the personal name Soběslav.

== Geography ==
Soběslav is located about 16 kilometres (10 mi) south of Tábor and 35 km (22 mi) northeast of České Budějovice. It lies on the border between the Třeboň Basin and Tábor Uplands.

The town is situated at the confluence of the Lužnice River and the stream Černovický potok. There are several fishponds in the territory of Soběslav. The fishpond Nový rybník with its surroundings is protected as the Nový rybník u Soběslavi Nature Monument.

== History ==
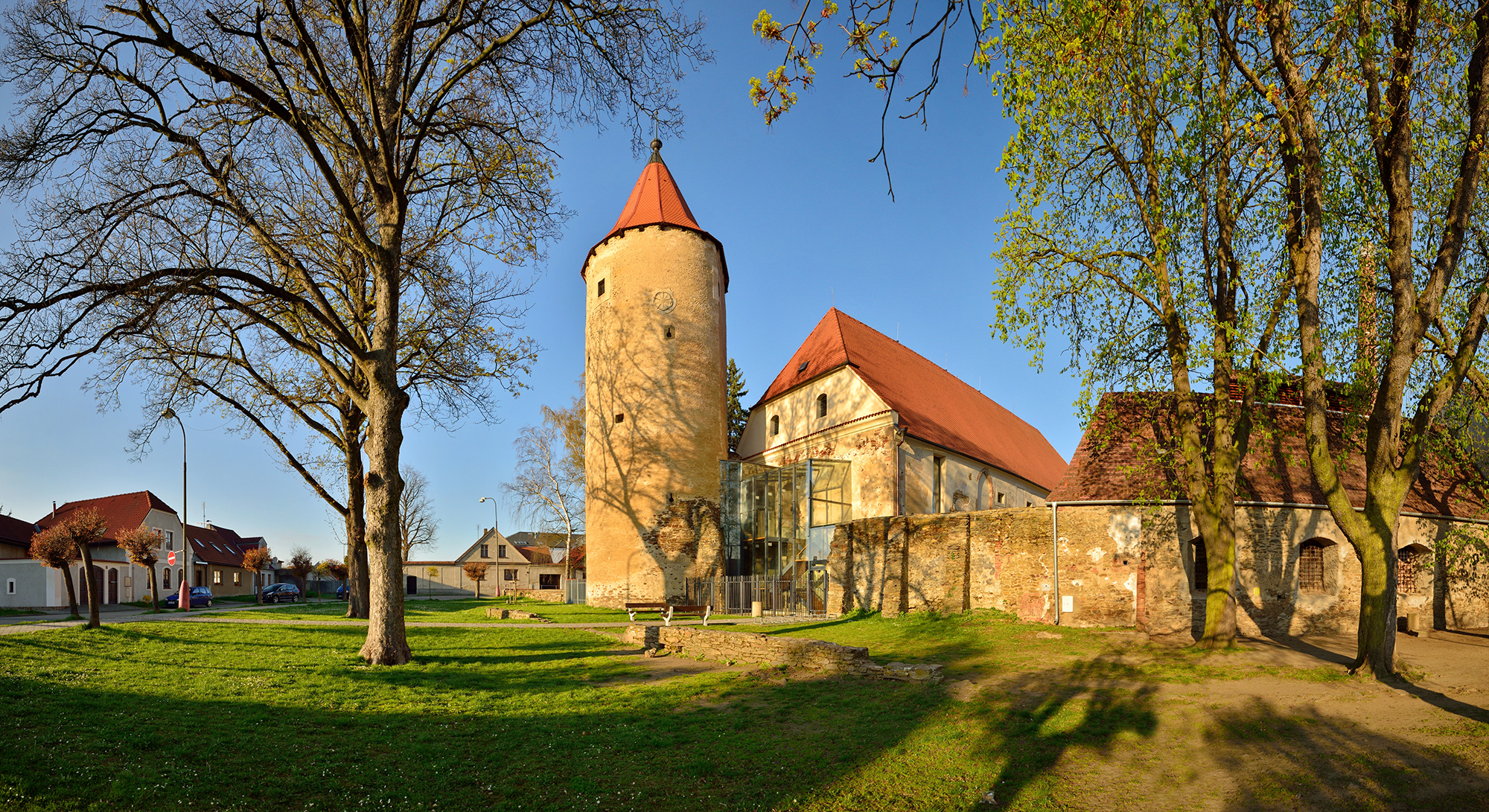
Soběslav Castle and Hláska Tower

The first written mention of Soběslav is from 1293, when the castle and surrounding areas belonged to the Rosenberg family. In obtained town rights in 1390. Four years later, King Wenceslaus IV imprisoned in the local castle. The town was burned down in 1421 (during the Hussite Wars) and then in 1435 (by the Taborites).

In the 16th century, Soběslav was the seat of Peter Vok of Rosenberg and one of the most important towns of the Rosenbergs' estate. It represented the economic centre of southern Bohemia with ties to Bavaria and Austria. This most important stage in the history of the town is evident in numerous historic buildings in the town to this day.

In 1871, the town was connected by a railway with Prague.

== Demographics ==
Historical population

Year	Pop.	±%
1869	3,706	—
1880	4,350	+17.4%
1890	4,251	−2.3%
1900	4,193	−1.4%
1910	4,232	+0.9%

Year	Pop.	±%
1921	4,312	+1.9%
1930	4,596	+6.6%
1950	4,785	+4.1%
1961	5,850	+22.3%
1970	6,304	+7.8%

Year	Pop.	±%
1980	6,988	+10.9%
1991	7,365	+5.4%
2001	7,292	−1.0%
2011	7,057	−3.2%
2021	6,801	−3.6%

Source: Censuses

== Transport ==
The D3 motorway (part of the European route E55) from Tábor to České Budějovice runs next to the town.

Soběslav is located on the railway line Prague–České Budějovice.

There is a small civil airport on the southern edge of the town.

== Sights ==
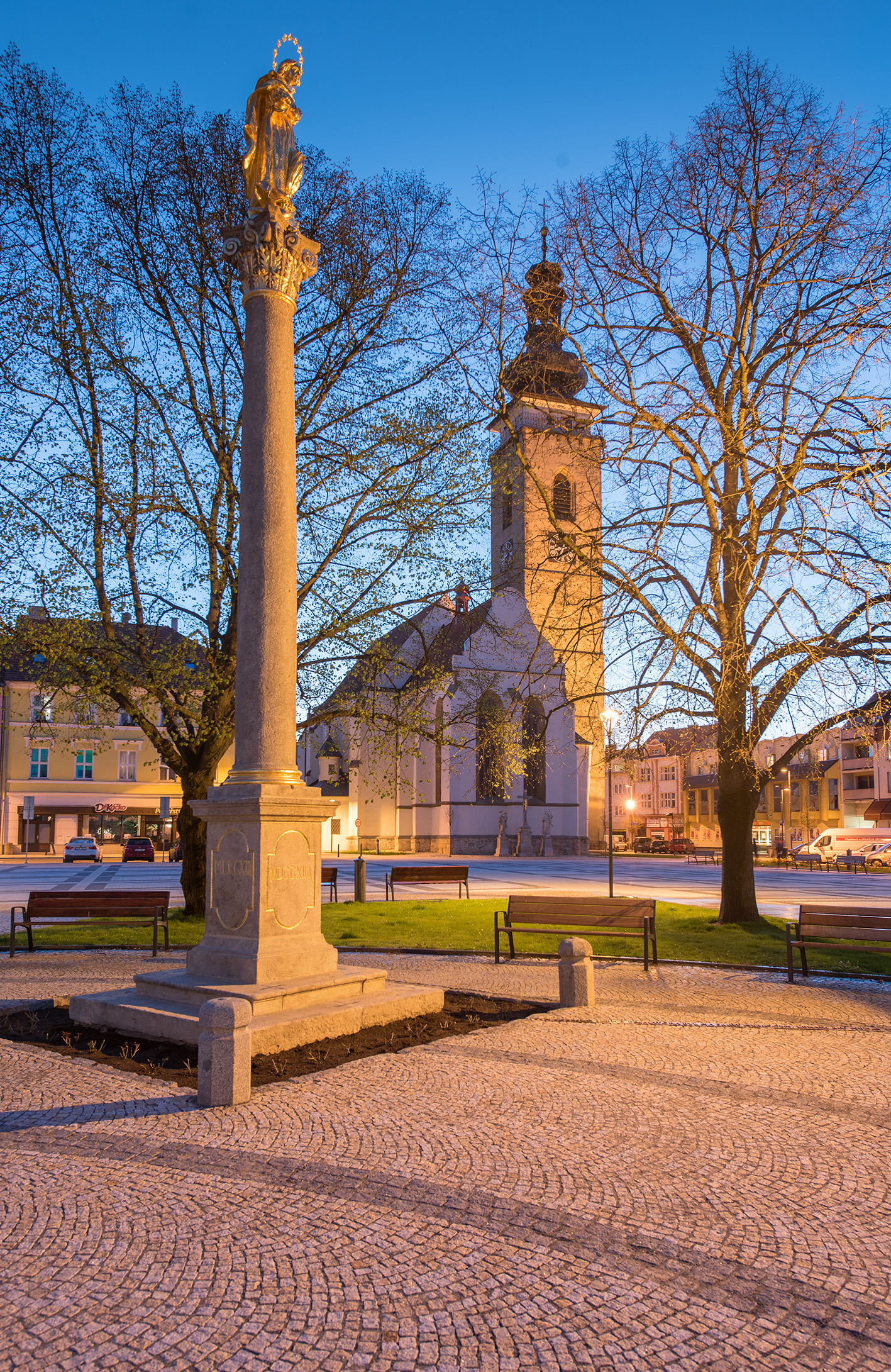
Main square

The historical part of the town is protected as an urban monument zone. The Church of Saint Vitus is a Gothic building from 1375, founded by Oldřich I of Rosenberg. It was modified in the 15th–18th centuries, but it retained its Gothic character.

The Soběslav Castle is known for its well-preserved cylindrical tower Hláska, which is among the main landmarks of the town. The castle fell into disrepair in the 1980s. Its northern wing was reconstructed in 2010 and today it houses the town library.

The Church of Saints Peter and Paul is the main landmark of the town square. An old church was completely rebuilt in the late Gothic style in 1493–1517. The parish church has a 68-metre (223 ft) high tower, open to the public as a lookout tower.

There are two museums in the town: Smrčkův dům ('Smrčka's house'; an ethnographic museum) and Rožmberský dům ('Rosenberg house'; a museum with nature-related expositions). They are located in two Renaissance houses.

On the outskirts of Soběslav is a forest and hill called Svákov. On the hill is the Svákov observation tower, remains of a Slavic gord and the Chapel of Our Lady of Sorrows. The chapel dates from 1867 and the path to it is lined with the Stations of the Cross.

== Notable people ==
- Otakar Ostrčil (1879–1935), pedagogue, composer and conductor; visited regularly the town and composed here

== Twin towns – sister cities ==
Soběslav is twinned with:

- Sabinov, Slovakia
