= Sedlečko u Soběslavě =

- Municipality
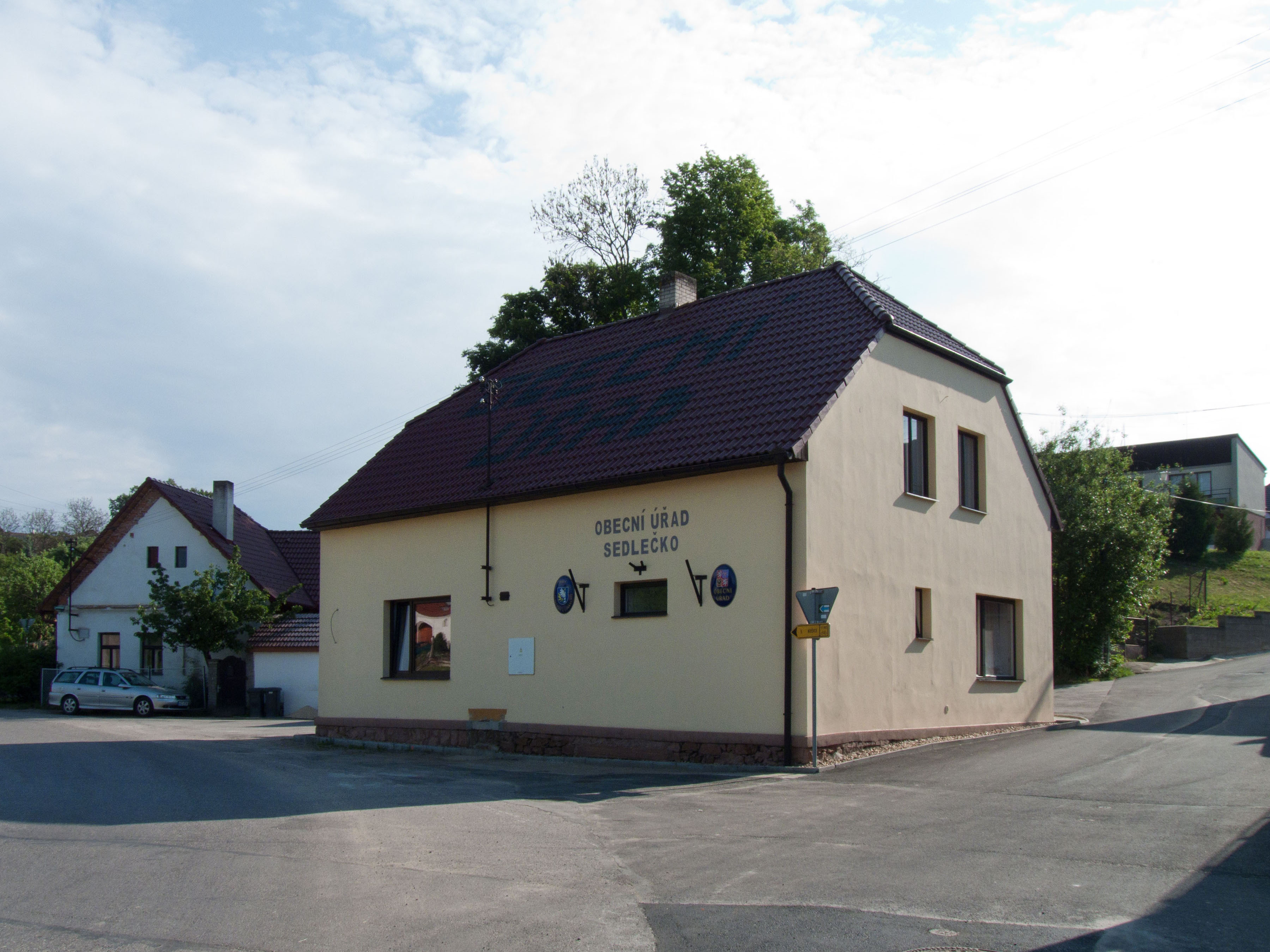
- Municipal office

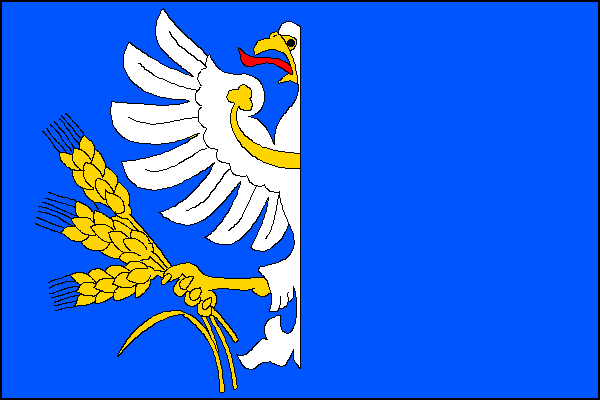
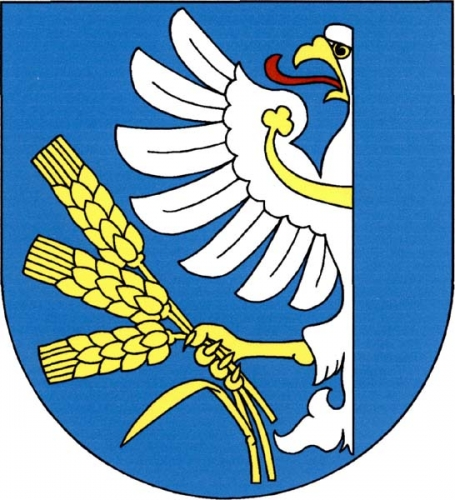
- Flag Coat of arms

- Location in the Czech Republic
- Coordinates: 49°16′58″N 14°44′34″E
- Country: Czech Republic
- Region: South Bohemian
- District: Tábor
- First mentioned: 1366

Area
  - Total: 2.86 km^{2} (1.10 sq mi)
- Elevation: 423 m (1,388 ft)

Population (2026-01-01)
  - Total: 227
  - Density: 79.4/km^{2} (206/sq mi)
- Time zone: UTC+1 (CET)
  - Summer (DST): UTC+2 (CEST)
- Postal code: 392 01
- Website: www.sedleckousobeslave.cz

Sedlečko u Soběslavě is a municipality and village in Tábor District in the South Bohemian Region of the Czech Republic. It has about 200 inhabitants.

Sedlečko u Soběslavě lies approximately 16 kilometres (10 mi) south-east of Tábor, 40 km (25 mi) north-east of České Budějovice, and 93 km (58 mi) south of Prague.

== Demographics ==
Historical population
Year	Pop.	±%
1869	183	—
1880	193	+5.5%
1890	195	+1.0%
1900	198	+1.5%
1910	195	−1.5%
1921	185	−5.1%
1930	184	−0.5%
1950	142	−22.8%
1961	142	+0.0%
1970	138	−2.8%
1980	121	−12.3%
1991	102	−15.7%
2001	102	+0.0%
2011	125	+22.5%
2021	172	+37.6%
Source: Censuses
