= Klenovice =

- Municipality
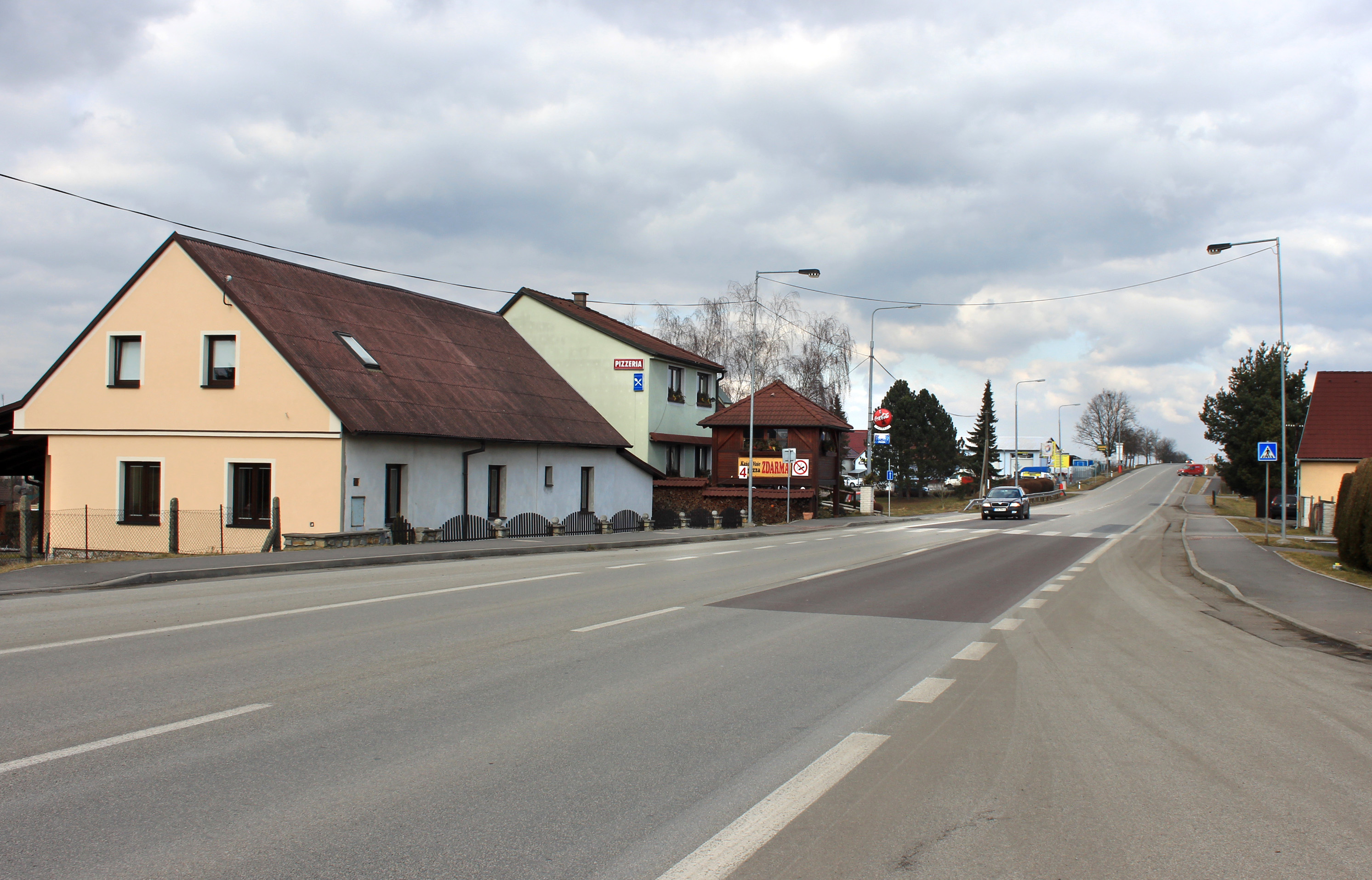
- Main road

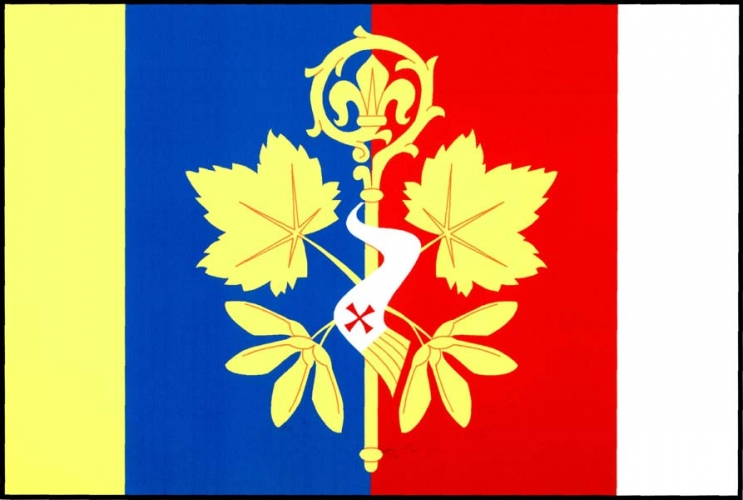
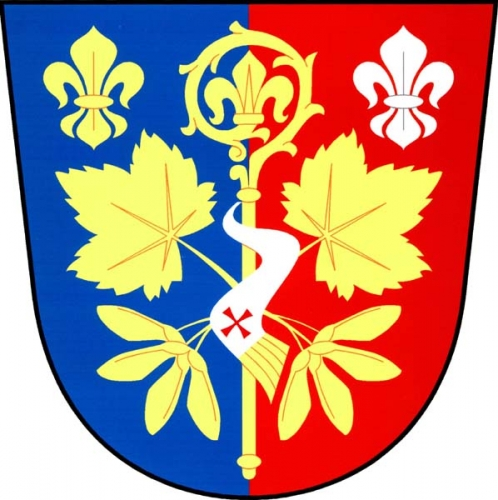
- Flag Coat of arms

- Location in the Czech Republic
- Coordinates: 49°16′44″N 14°42′56″E
- Country: Czech Republic
- Region: South Bohemian
- District: Tábor
- First mentioned: 1398

Area
  - Total: 6.57 km^{2} (2.54 sq mi)
- Elevation: 418 m (1,371 ft)

Population (2026-01-01)
  - Total: 704
  - Density: 107/km^{2} (278/sq mi)
- Time zone: UTC+1 (CET)
  - Summer (DST): UTC+2 (CEST)
- Postal code: 392 01
- Website: www.klenovice.cz

Klenovice is a municipality and village in Tábor District in the South Bohemian Region of the Czech Republic. It has about 700 inhabitants.

Klenovice lies approximately 16 kilometres (10 mi) south of Tábor, 39 km (24 mi) north-east of České Budějovice, and 92 km (57 mi) south of Prague.

== Demographics ==
Historical population
| Year | Pop. | ±% |
|---|---|---|
| 1869 | 371 | — |
| 1880 | 389 | +4.9% |
| 1890 | 377 | −3.1% |
| 1900 | 395 | +4.8% |
| 1910 | 393 | −0.5% |
| 1921 | 389 | −1.0% |
| 1930 | 417 | +7.2% |
| 1950 | 348 | −16.5% |
| 1961 | 375 | +7.8% |
| 1970 | 380 | +1.3% |
| 1980 | 354 | −6.8% |
| 1991 | 357 | +0.8% |
| 2001 | 380 | +6.4% |
| 2011 | 634 | +66.8% |
| 2021 | 662 | +4.4% |
Source: Censuses
