= Bohutín (Šumperk District) =

- Municipality
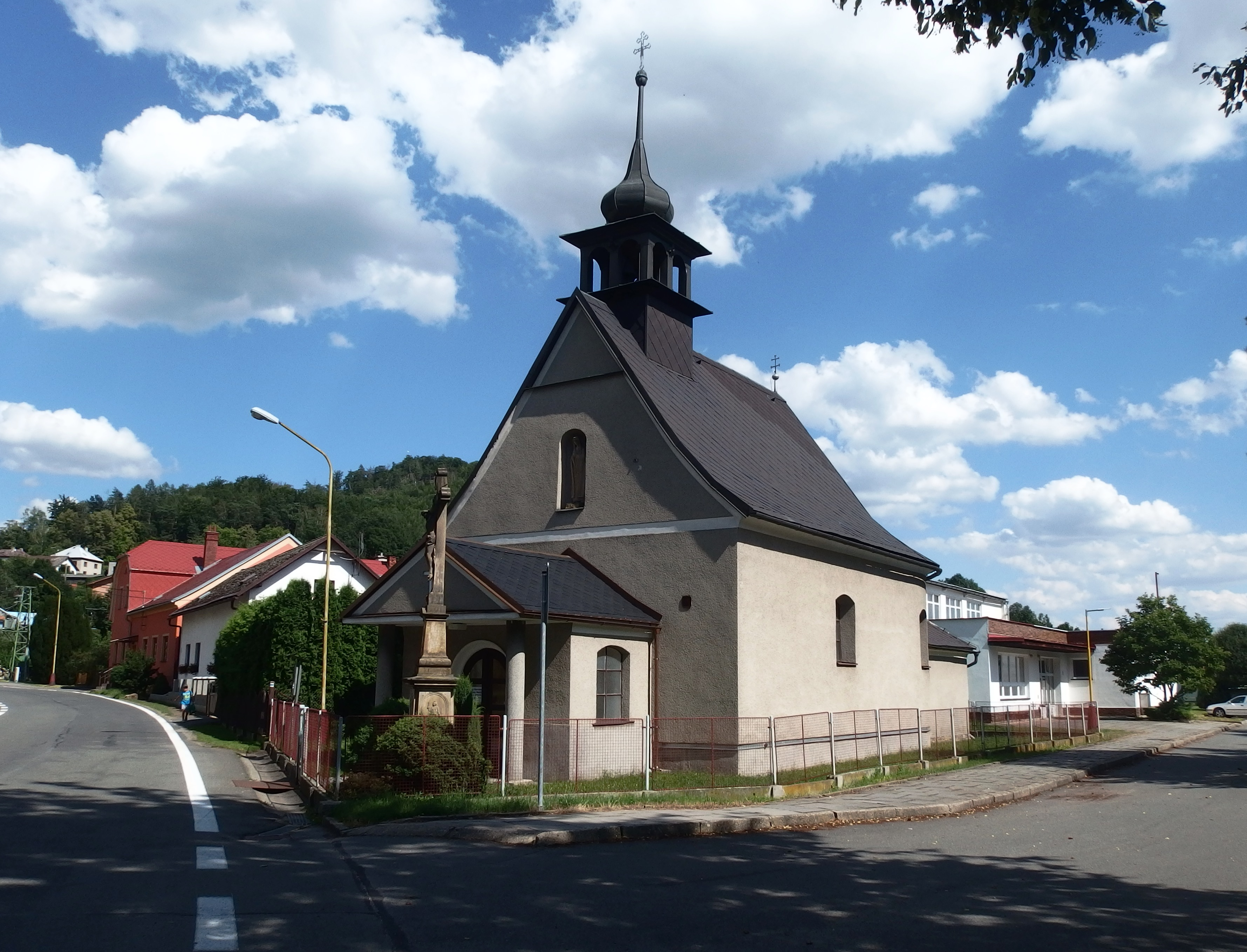
- Chapel of the Nativity of the Virgin Mary

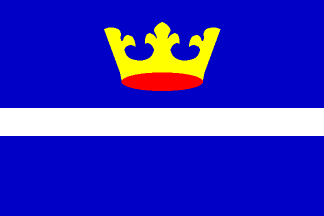
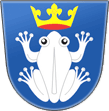
- Flag Coat of arms

- Location in the Czech Republic
- Coordinates: 49°57′13″N 16°52′55″E
- Country: Czech Republic
- Region: Olomouc
- District: Šumperk
- First mentioned: 1371

Area
  - Total: 2.25 km^{2} (0.87 sq mi)
- Elevation: 340 m (1,120 ft)

Population (2026-01-01)
  - Total: 764
  - Density: 340/km^{2} (879/sq mi)
- Time zone: UTC+1 (CET)
  - Summer (DST): UTC+2 (CEST)
- Postal codes: 789 62
- Website: www.bohutin.cz

Bohutín is a municipality and village in Šumperk District in the Olomouc Region of the Czech Republic. It has about 800 inhabitants.

Bohutín lies approximately 7 kilometres (4 mi) west of Šumperk and 49 km (30 mi) north-west of Olomouc.

== History ==
The first written mention of Bohutín is from 1371.

== Demographics ==
Historical population
Year	Pop.	±%
1869	401	—
1880	402	+0.2%
1890	407	+1.2%
1900	400	−1.7%
1910	448	+12.0%
1921	473	+5.6%
1930	494	+4.4%
1950	415	−16.0%
1961	496	+19.5%
1970	618	+24.6%
1980	953	+54.2%
1991	912	−4.3%
2001	880	−3.5%
2011	761	−13.5%
2021	709	−6.8%
Source: Censuses
