= Černovice (Pelhřimov District) =

- Town
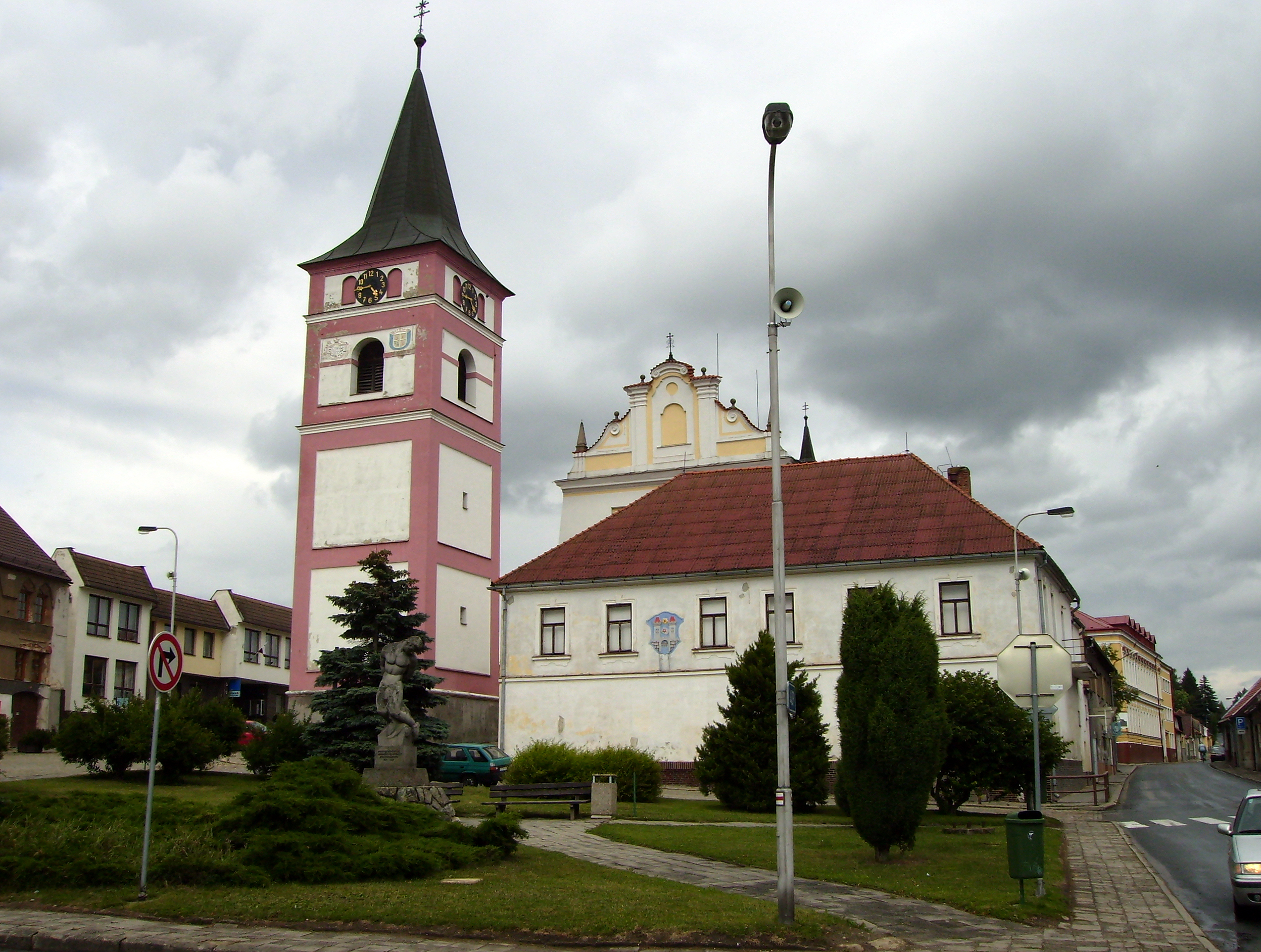
- Town square

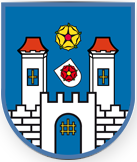
- Flag Coat of arms

- Location in the Czech Republic
- Coordinates: 49°22′22″N 14°57′39″E
- Country: Czech Republic
- Region: Vysočina
- District: Pelhřimov
- First mentioned: 1322

Government
  - Mayor: Jan Brožek

Area
  - Total: 36.53 km^{2} (14.10 sq mi)
- Elevation: 594 m (1,949 ft)

Population (2026-01-01)
  - Total: 1,782
  - Density: 48.78/km^{2} (126.3/sq mi)
- Time zone: UTC+1 (CET)
  - Summer (DST): UTC+2 (CEST)
- Postal codes: 394 70, 394 94
- Website: www.mestocernovice.cz

Černovice (Czech pronunciation: [ˈtʃɛrnovɪtsɛ]; German: Tschernowitz) is a town in Pelhřimov District in the Vysočina Region of the Czech Republic. It has about 1,800 inhabitants.

== Administrative division ==
Černovice consists of nine municipal parts (in brackets population according to the 2021 census):

- Černovice (1,406)
- Benešov (69)
- Dobešov (84)
- Panské Mlýny (4)
- Rytov (26)
- Střítež (14)
- Svatava (56)
- Vackov (21)
- Vlkosovice (48)

== Etymology ==
The initial name of the settlement was Črnějovice. The name was derived from the personal name Črněj, meaning "the village of Črněj's people". Already in the second half of the 14th century, the name Černovice began to appear.

== Geography ==
Černovice is located about 20 kilometres (12 mi) west of Pelhřimov and 44 km (27 mi) west of Jihlava. It lies in the Křemešník Highlands. The highest point is at 730 m (2,400 ft) above sea level. The upper course of the stream Černovický potok flows through the town. The town is surrounded by several small fishponds.

== History ==
The first written mention of Černovice is from 1322. From 1322 to 1597, it was a property of the Rosenberg family. Černovice was burned down during the Hussite Wars and damaged several times by fires between 1611 and 1857, so almost no historical buildings have survived to this day. Černovice was a market town, which was promoted to a town in the mid-19th century.

== Demographics ==
Historical population

Year	Pop.	±%
1869	3,697	—
1880	3,650	−1.3%
1890	3,657	+0.2%
1900	3,529	−3.5%
1910	3,411	−3.3%

Year	Pop.	±%
1921	3,357	−1.6%
1930	3,023	−9.9%
1950	2,549	−15.7%
1961	2,335	−8.4%
1970	2,135	−8.6%

Year	Pop.	±%
1980	2,003	−6.2%
1991	1,901	−5.1%
2001	1,846	−2.9%
2011	1,824	−1.2%
2021	1,728	−5.3%

Source: Censuses

== Transport ==
Černovice is located on the Jindřichův Hradec narrow-gauge railway, leading from Jindřichův Hradec to Obrataň. It serves mostly as a tourist attraction.

== Sights ==
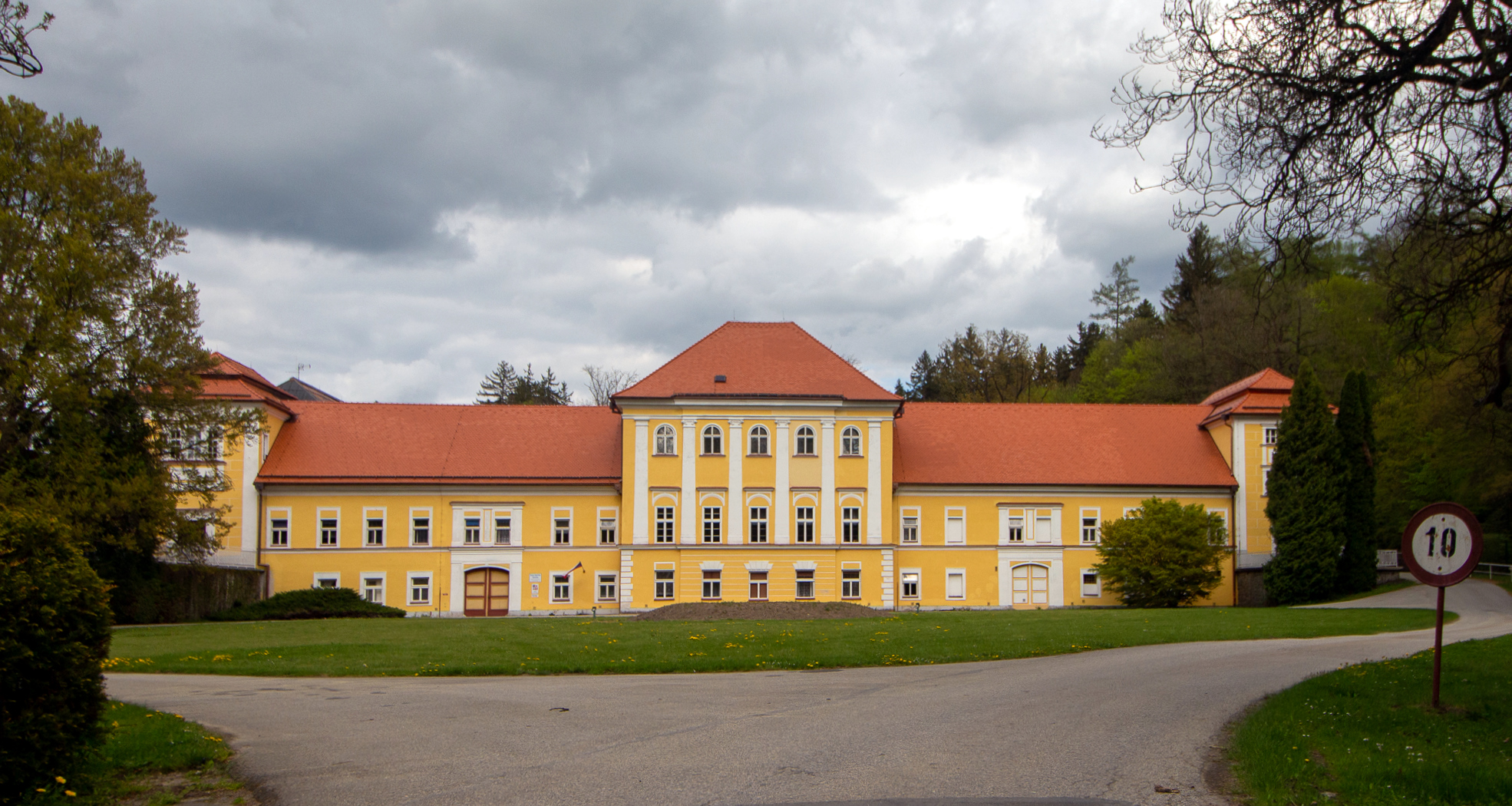
Černovice Castle

The main landmark of the town square is the Church of the Exaltation of the Holy Cross. It was a Gothic church from the 14th century, rebuilt in the Baroque style. Next to the church is a separate bell tower.

The Černovice Castle is a late Neoclassical building, surrounded by an extensive landscape park. Today it houses an institute of social care.

== Twin towns – sister cities ==
Černovice is twinned with:

- Biglen, Switzerland
