= Psárov =

- Municipality
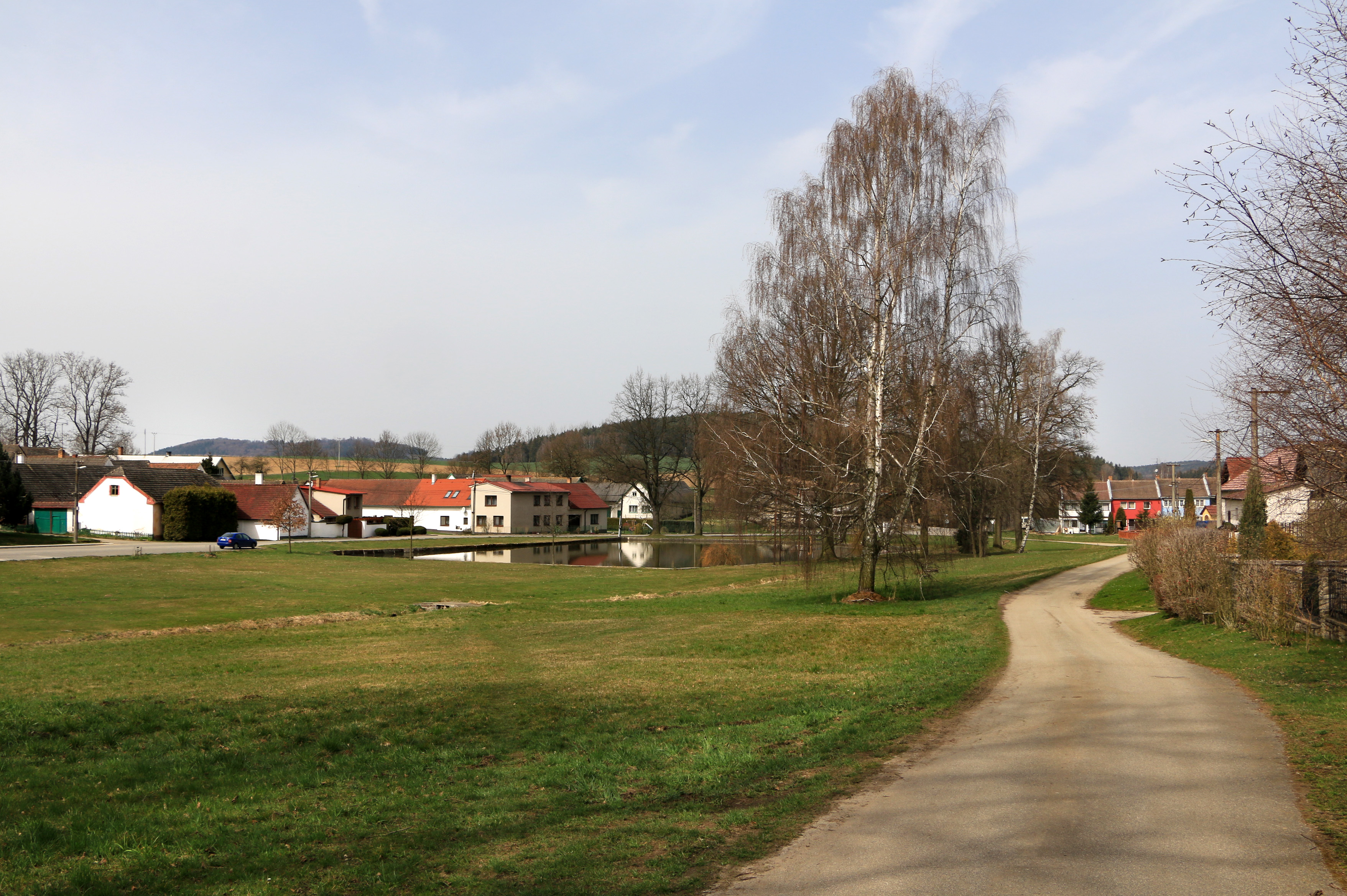
- Centre of Psárov

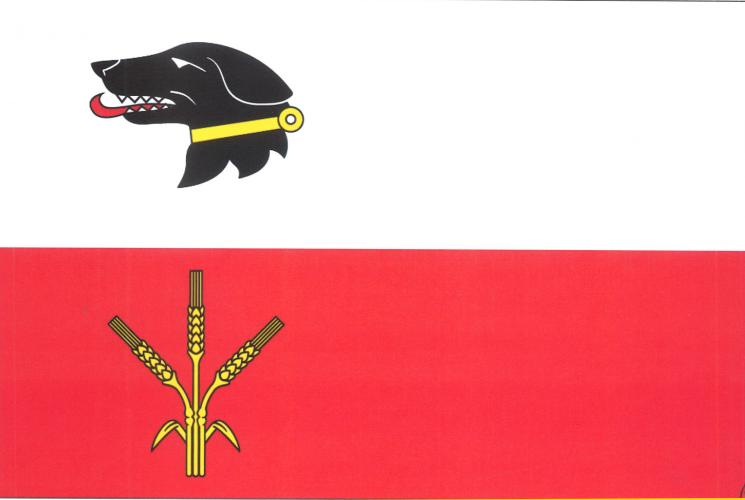
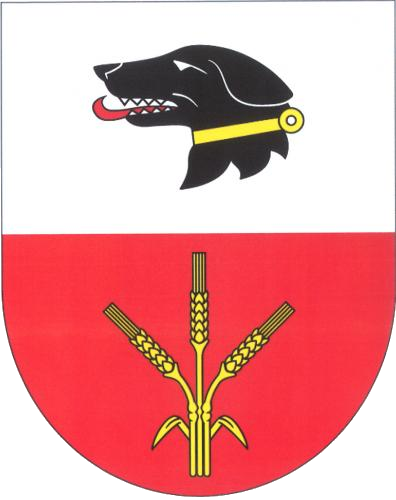
- Flag Coat of arms

- Location in the Czech Republic
- Coordinates: 49°19′8″N 14°54′20″E
- Country: Czech Republic
- Region: South Bohemian
- District: Tábor
- First mentioned: 1379

Area
  - Total: 10.89 km^{2} (4.20 sq mi)
- Elevation: 550 m (1,800 ft)

Population (2026-01-01)
  - Total: 106
  - Density: 9.73/km^{2} (25.2/sq mi)
- Time zone: UTC+1 (CET)
  - Summer (DST): UTC+2 (CEST)
- Postal code: 392 01
- Website: www.triklasovice-psarov.cz

Psárov is a municipality and village in Tábor District in the South Bohemian Region of the Czech Republic. It has about 100 inhabitants.

Psárov lies approximately 21 kilometres (13 mi) south-east of Tábor, 50 km (31 mi) north-east of České Budějovice, and 93 km (58 mi) south of Prague.

== Administrative division ==
Psárov consists of two municipal parts (in brackets population according to the 2021 census):

- Psárov (78)
- Tříklasovice (34)

== Demographics ==
Historical population
Year	Pop.	±%
1869	522	—
1880	501	−4.0%
1890	481	−4.0%
1900	514	+6.9%
1910	467	−9.1%
1921	432	−7.5%
1930	391	−9.5%
1950	293	−25.1%
1961	277	−5.5%
1970	262	−5.4%
1980	232	−11.5%
1991	189	−18.5%
2001	163	−13.8%
2011	114	−30.1%
2021	112	−1.8%
Source: Censuses
