= Budislav (Tábor District) =

- Municipality
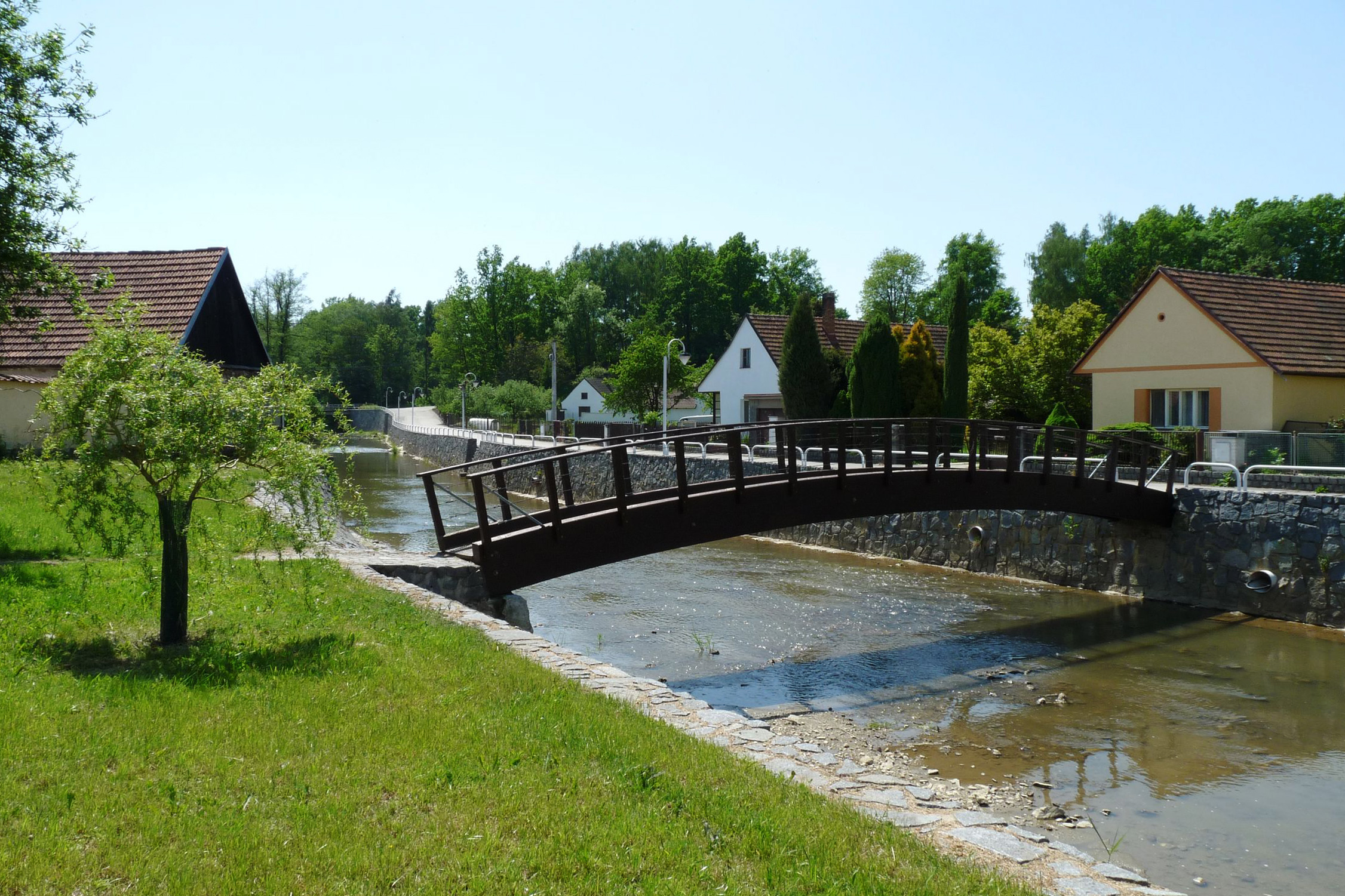
- Černovický potok flowing through Budislav

- Flag Coat of arms

- Location in the Czech Republic
- Coordinates: 49°17′38″N 14°50′15″E
- Country: Czech Republic
- Region: South Bohemian
- District: Tábor
- First mentioned: 1357

Area
  - Total: 8.85 km^{2} (3.42 sq mi)
- Elevation: 455 m (1,493 ft)

Population (2026-01-01)
  - Total: 379
  - Density: 42.8/km^{2} (111/sq mi)
- Time zone: UTC+1 (CET)
  - Summer (DST): UTC+2 (CEST)
- Postal code: 392 01
- Website: www.jihoceskabudislav.cz

Budislav is a municipality and village in Tábor District in the South Bohemian Region of the Czech Republic. It has about 400 inhabitants.

Budislav lies approximately 19 kilometres (12 mi) south-east of Tábor, 45 km (28 mi) north-east of České Budějovice, and 94 km (58 mi) south of Prague.

== Administrative division ==
Budislav consists of three municipal parts (in brackets population according to the 2021 census):

- Budislav (297)
- Hlavňov (56)
- Záluží u Budislavě (39)

== Demographics ==
Historical population
Year	Pop.	±%
1869	960	—
1880	912	−5.0%
1890	950	+4.2%
1900	870	−8.4%
1910	816	−6.2%
1921	801	−1.8%
1930	623	−22.2%
1950	531	−14.8%
1961	602	+13.4%
1970	541	−10.1%
1980	540	−0.2%
1991	477	−11.7%
2001	449	−5.9%
2011	405	−9.8%
2021	392	−3.2%
Source: Censuses
