= Lidmaň =

- Municipality
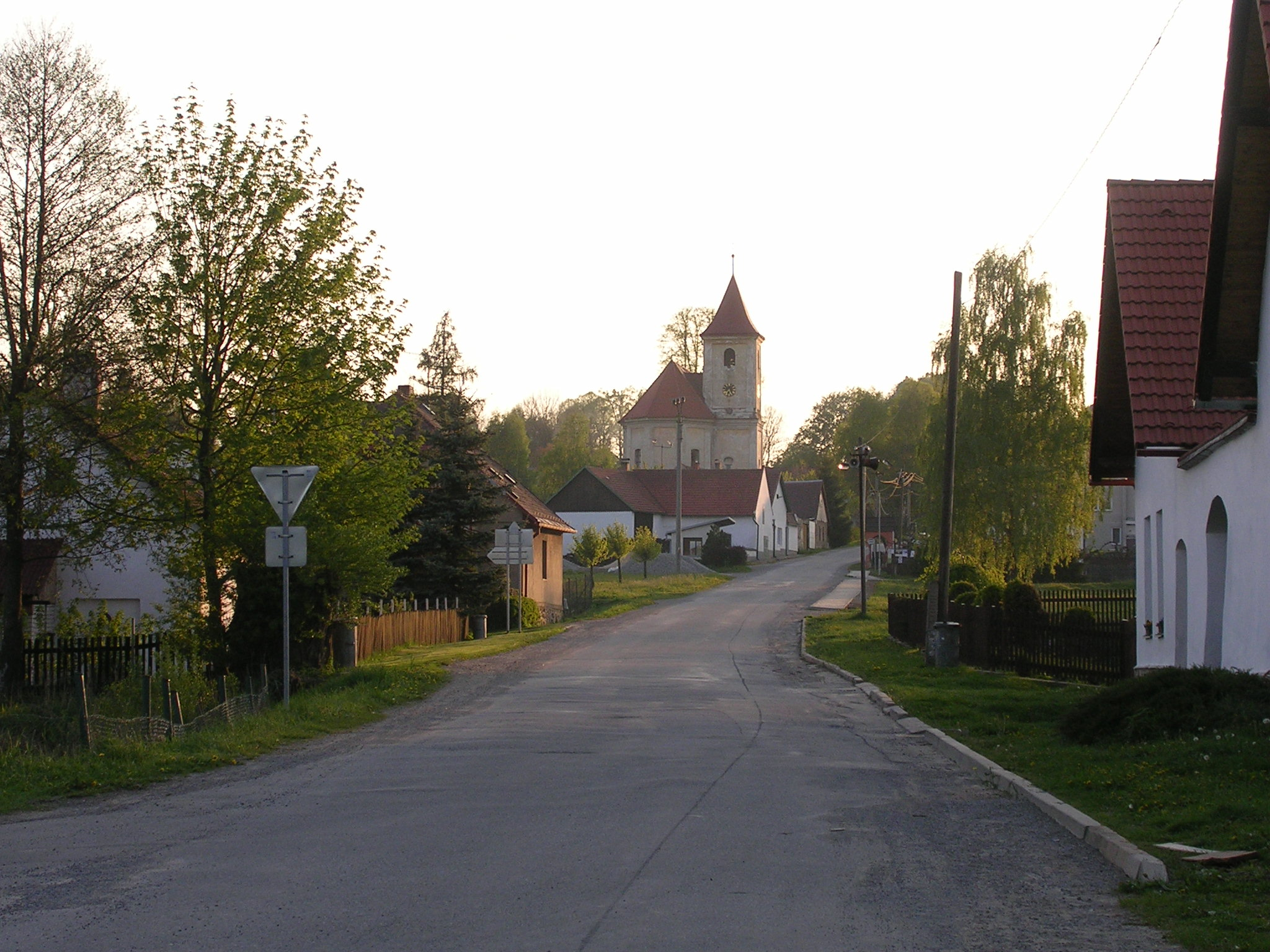
- Church of the Nativity of the Virgin Mary

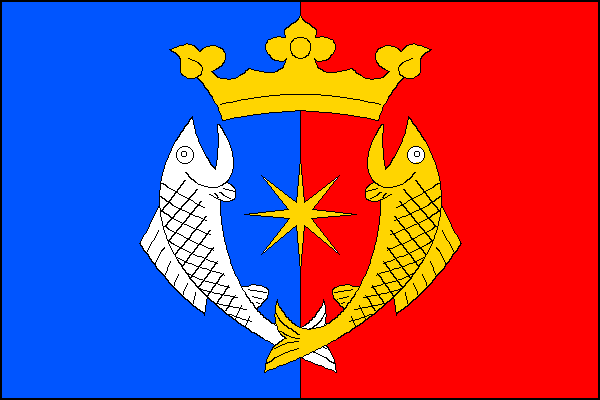
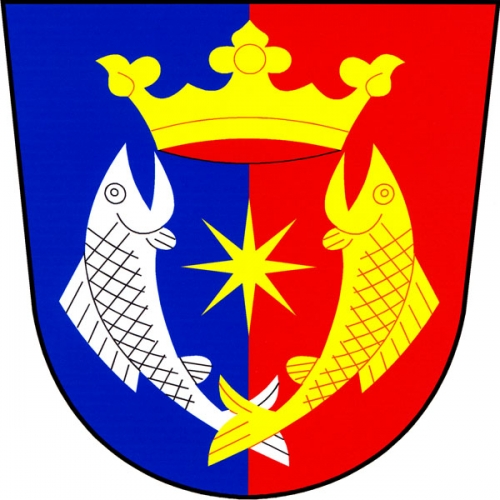
- Flag Coat of arms

- Location in the Czech Republic
- Coordinates: 49°22′55″N 15°2′12″E
- Country: Czech Republic
- Region: Vysočina
- District: Pelhřimov
- First mentioned: 1359

Area
  - Total: 13.06 km^{2} (5.04 sq mi)
- Elevation: 631 m (2,070 ft)

Population (2026-01-01)
  - Total: 268
  - Density: 20.5/km^{2} (53.1/sq mi)
- Time zone: UTC+1 (CET)
  - Summer (DST): UTC+2 (CEST)
- Postal code: 395 01
- Website: www.lidman-ou.cz

Lidmaň is a municipality and village in Pelhřimov District in the Vysočina Region of the Czech Republic. It has about 300 inhabitants.

Lidmaň lies approximately 15 kilometres (9 mi) west of Pelhřimov, 41 km (25 mi) west of Jihlava, and 90 km (56 mi) south-east of Prague. The stream Černovický potok originates in the municipal territory.

== Administrative division ==
Lidmaň consists of four municipal parts (in brackets population according to the 2021 census):

- Lidmaň (216)
- Bohutín (8)
- Hojava (9)
- Lidmaňka (36)

== Demographics ==
Historical population
Year	Pop.	±%
1869	995	—
1880	1,051	+5.6%
1890	964	−8.3%
1900	914	−5.2%
1910	816	−10.7%
1921	779	−4.5%
1930	733	−5.9%
1950	436	−40.5%
1961	414	−5.0%
1970	327	−21.0%
1980	272	−16.8%
1991	278	+2.2%
2001	285	+2.5%
2011	268	−6.0%
2021	269	+0.4%
Source: Censuses
