= Vlčeves =

- Municipality
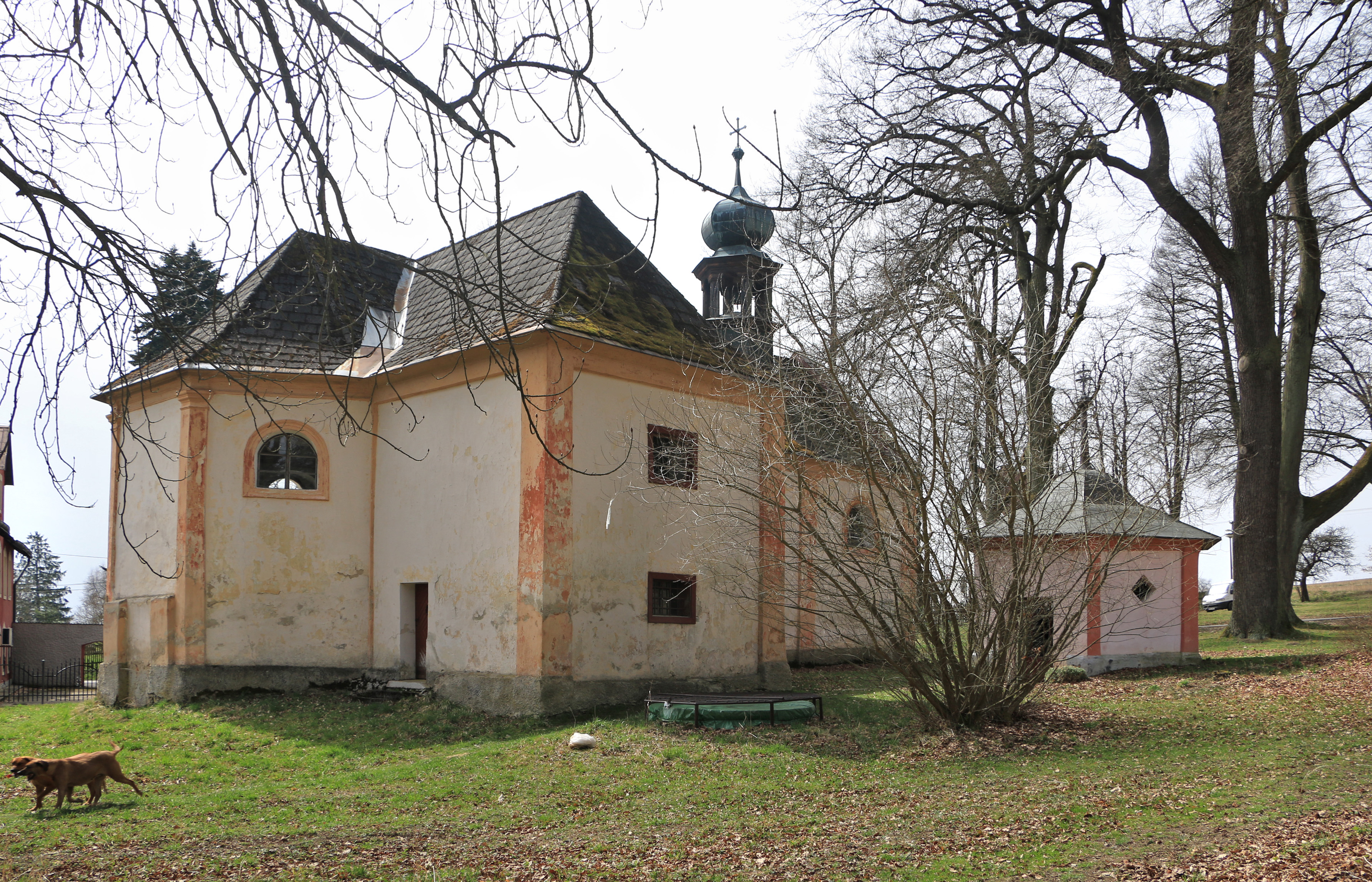
- Church of Saint Anne

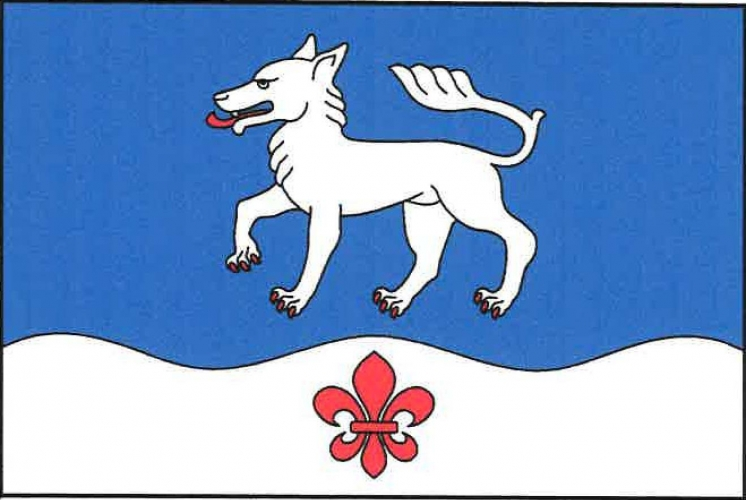
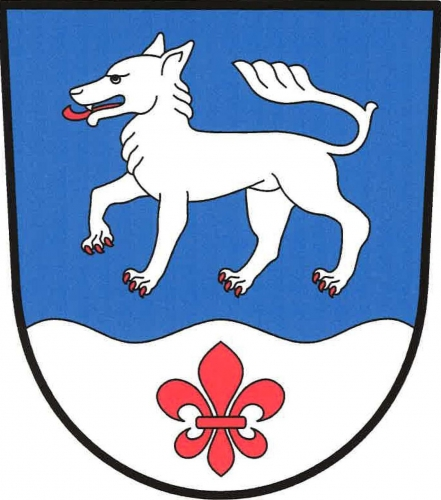
- Flag Coat of arms

- Location in the Czech Republic
- Coordinates: 49°21′26″N 14°54′2″E
- Country: Czech Republic
- Region: South Bohemian
- District: Tábor
- First mentioned: 1379

Area
  - Total: 6.39 km^{2} (2.47 sq mi)
- Elevation: 555 m (1,821 ft)

Population (2026-01-01)
  - Total: 103
  - Density: 16.1/km^{2} (41.7/sq mi)
- Time zone: UTC+1 (CET)
  - Summer (DST): UTC+2 (CEST)
- Postal code: 391 18
- Website: www.vlceves.cz

Vlčeves is a municipality and village in Tábor District in the South Bohemian Region of the Czech Republic. It has about 100 inhabitants.

Vlčeves lies approximately 20 kilometres (12 mi) east of Tábor, 53 km (33 mi) north-east of České Budějovice, and 89 km (55 mi) south-east of Prague.

== Administrative division ==
Vlčeves consists of two municipal parts (in brackets population according to the 2021 census):

- Vlčeves (103)
- Svatá Anna (6)

== Demographics ==
Historical population
Year	Pop.	±%
1869	591	—
1880	625	+5.8%
1890	607	−2.9%
1900	578	−4.8%
1910	538	−6.9%
1921	525	−2.4%
1930	440	−16.2%
1950	347	−21.1%
1961	336	−3.2%
1970	263	−21.7%
1980	185	−29.7%
1991	129	−30.3%
2001	95	−26.4%
2011	72	−24.2%
2021	109	+51.4%
Source: Censuses
