= Hojovice =

- Municipality
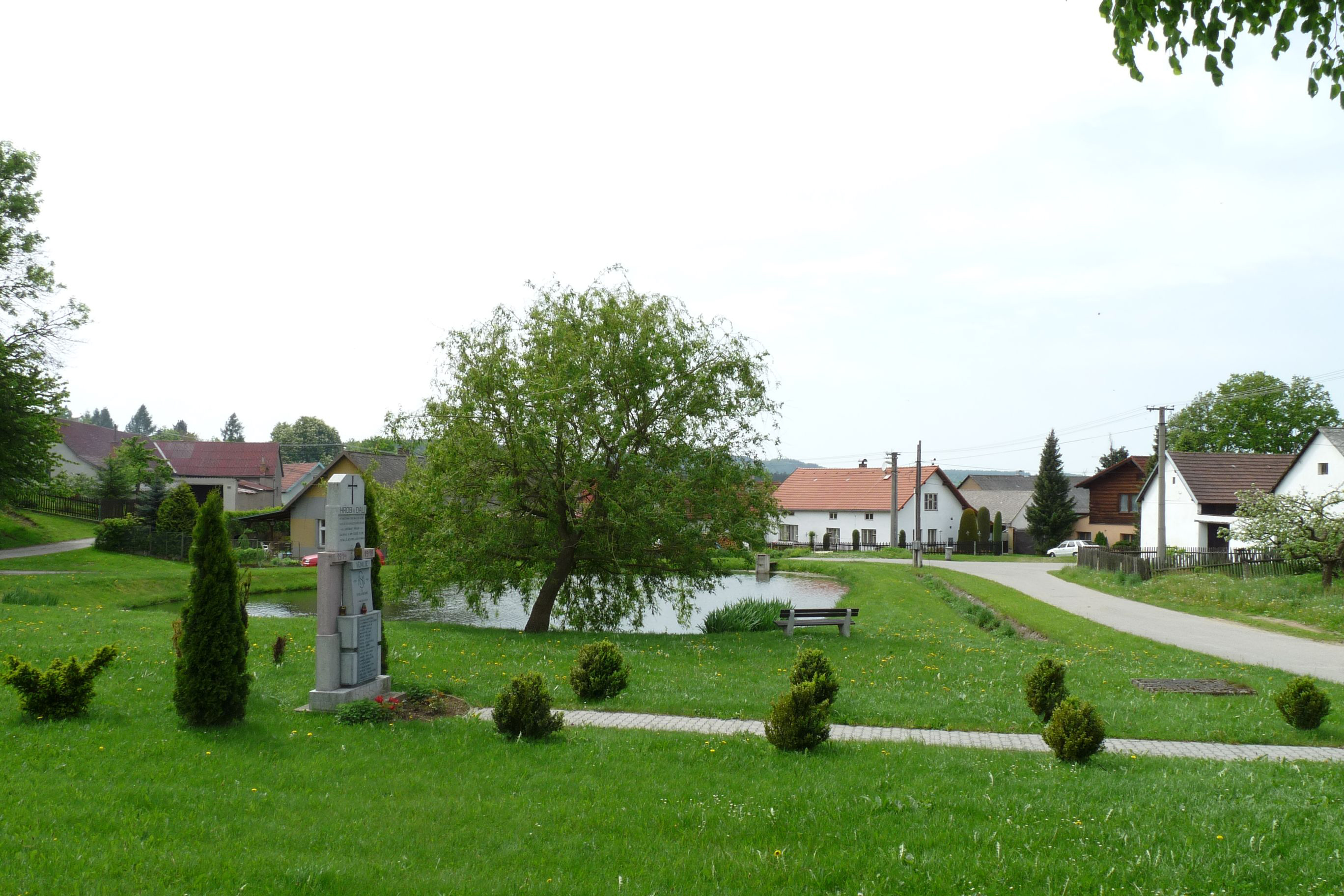
- Centre of Hojovice

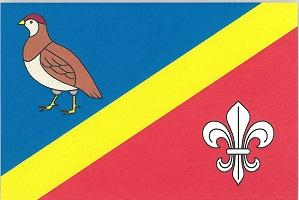
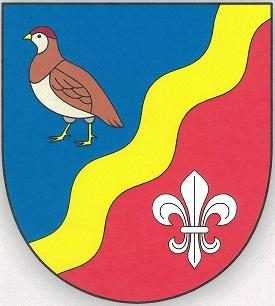
- Flag Coat of arms

- Location in the Czech Republic
- Coordinates: 49°19′42″N 14°55′11″E
- Country: Czech Republic
- Region: Vysočina
- District: Pelhřimov
- First mentioned: 1318

Area
  - Total: 5.77 km^{2} (2.23 sq mi)
- Elevation: 450 m (1,480 ft)

Population (2026-01-01)
  - Total: 84
  - Density: 15/km^{2} (38/sq mi)
- Time zone: UTC+1 (CET)
  - Summer (DST): UTC+2 (CEST)
- Postal code: 395 01
- Website: www.obec-hojovice.cz

Hojovice is a municipality and village in Pelhřimov District in the Vysočina Region of the Czech Republic. It has about 80 inhabitants.

Hojovice lies approximately 24 kilometres (15 mi) south-west of Pelhřimov, 49 km (30 mi) west of Jihlava, and 92 km (57 mi) south-east of Prague.

== Demographics ==
Historical population
Year	Pop.	±%
1869	525	—
1880	471	−10.3%
1890	484	+2.8%
1900	439	−9.3%
1910	416	−5.2%
1921	403	−3.1%
1930	355	−11.9%
1950	277	−22.0%
1961	257	−7.2%
1970	181	−29.6%
1980	141	−22.1%
1991	87	−38.3%
2001	87	+0.0%
2011	70	−19.5%
2021	75	+7.1%
Source: Censuses
