= Zvěrotice =

- Municipality
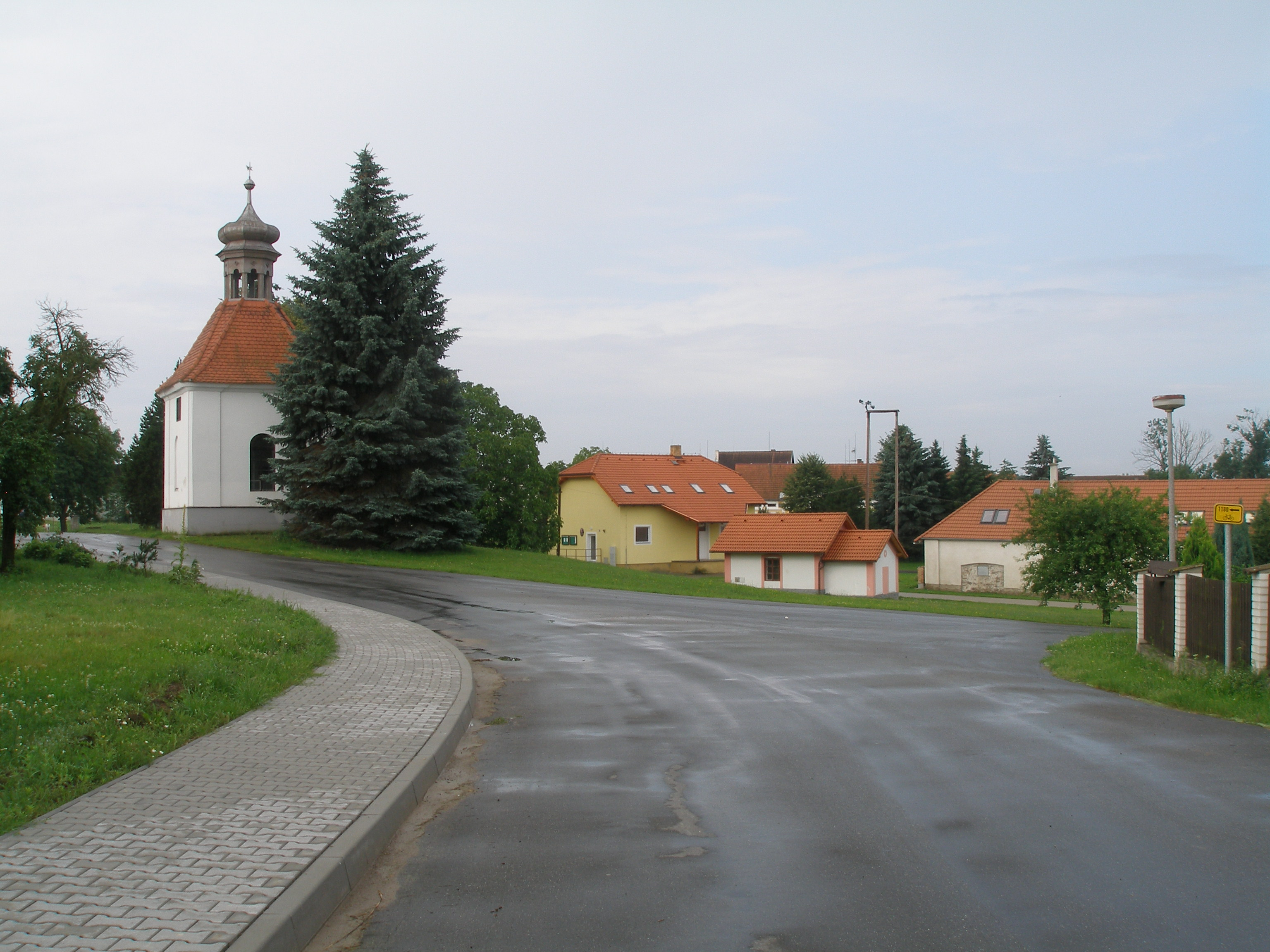
- Centre of Zvěrotice

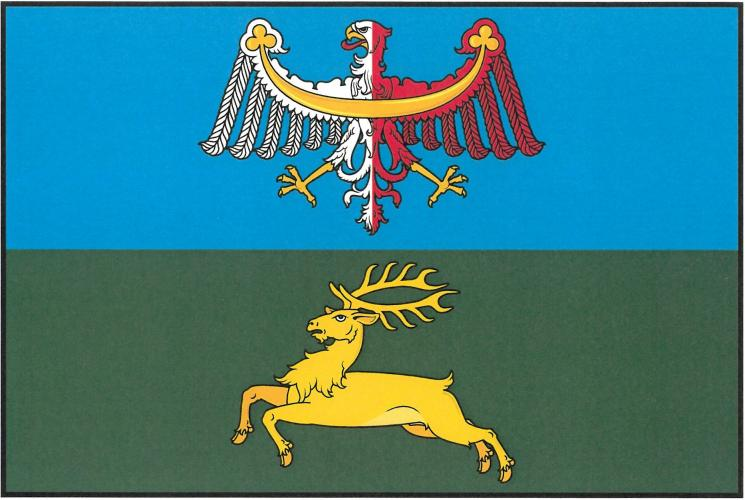
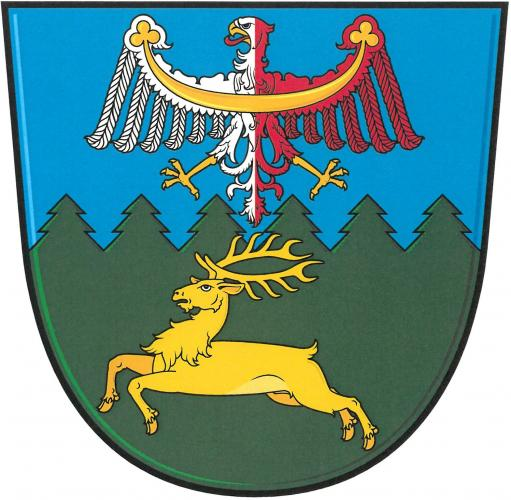
- Flag Coat of arms

- Location in the Czech Republic
- Coordinates: 49°16′19″N 14°44′41″E
- Country: Czech Republic
- Region: South Bohemian
- District: Tábor
- First mentioned: 1369

Area
  - Total: 6.40 km^{2} (2.47 sq mi)
- Elevation: 449 m (1,473 ft)

Population (2026-01-01)
  - Total: 399
  - Density: 62.3/km^{2} (161/sq mi)
- Time zone: UTC+1 (CET)
  - Summer (DST): UTC+2 (CEST)
- Postal code: 392 01
- Website: www.zverotice.cz

Zvěrotice is a municipality and village in Tábor District in the South Bohemian Region of the Czech Republic. It has about 400 inhabitants.

Zvěrotice lies approximately 18 kilometres (11 mi) south of Tábor, 39 km (24 mi) north-east of České Budějovice, and 94 km (58 mi) south of Prague.

== Demographics ==
Historical population
Year	Pop.	±%
1869	341	—
1880	346	+1.5%
1890	293	−15.3%
1900	323	+10.2%
1910	326	+0.9%
1921	323	−0.9%
1930	280	−13.3%
1950	254	−9.3%
1961	264	+3.9%
1970	242	−8.3%
1980	296	+22.3%
1991	344	+16.2%
2001	338	−1.7%
2011	369	+9.2%
2021	407	+10.3%
Source: Censuses
