= Sobiesław =

Sobiesław (Proto-Slavic: *Sobęslavь, Church Slavonic: Собѧславь, romanized: Sobęslavǐ) is a Polish masculine given name. By one hypothesis, it derived from sobie ('for me', 'myself') and sław ('glory', 'prestige'). Another suggestion is that derived from a Proto-Indo-European name meaning 'wise-famous', cognate with Sophocles (roots *sap and *ḱléwos). The Czech variant of the name is Soběslav. A similar name is Mojsław, "my glory". The feminine form is Sobiesława. Notable people with the name include:

- Sobiesław I, Duke of Pomerania (died 1177 or 1179)
- Sobiesław Zasada (born 1930), Polish rally driver

== See also ==
- Samborides, also known as House of Sobiesław, a Pomeranian dynasty
