= Komárov =

Komárov may refer to places:

== Czech Republic ==
- Komárov (Beroun District), a market town in the Central Bohemian Region
- Komárov (Olomouc District), a municipality and village in the Olomouc Region
- Komárov (Tábor District), a municipality and village in the South Bohemian Region
- Komárov (Zlín District), a municipality and village in the Zlín Region
- Komárov (Brno), a municipal part of Brno in the South Moravian Region
- Komárov, a village and part of Brzice in the Hradec Králové Region
- Komárov, a village and part of Chuchelna in the Liberec Region
- Komárov, a village and part of Dolní Roveň in the Pardubice Region
- Komárov, a village and part of Kladruby nad Labem in the Pardubice Region
- Komárov, a village and part of Nechanice in the Hradec Králové Region
- Komárov, a borough of Opava in the Moravian-Silesian Region
- Komárov, a village and part of Toužim in the Karlovy Vary Region
- Komárov, a village and part of Vítězná in the Hradec Králové Region

== Slovakia ==
- Komárov, Bardejov District, a municipality and village in the Prešov Region
- Komárov, a former village, which became part of Podunajské Biskupice (now a part of Bratislava)

== See also ==
- Komarov (disambiguation)
