= List of Czech serial killers =

A serial killer is typically a person who murders three or more people, with the murders taking place over more than a month and including a significant period of time between them. The Federal Bureau of Investigation (FBI) defines serial killing as "a series of two or more murders, committed as separate events, usually, but not always, by one offender acting alone".

== Identified serial killers ==
Name	Nickname / AKA	Years active	Proven victims	Possible victims	Status	Notes	Ref
Martin Roháč		1568–1571	59	N/A	Executed	Soldier turned robber and serial killer with the alleged highest number of victims in the Czech lands.	
Kateřina of Komárov		1529–1533	14	16	Exiled	Noblewoman who was infamous for the rumours of her mistreatment of the serfs on the estates of her spouse, which she tended during his absences. She was brought to trial in 1533 and convicted for the murder of 14 people, though she was allegedly the murderer of 30 people. She was sentenced to imprisonment in a tower in Prague Castle.	
Jaroslav and Dana Stodolovi		2001–2002	8	2	Life imprisonment	Pair of Czech-Slovak serial killers who robbed and murdered several retirees. Five people survived their attacks. In total, they were convicted of committing 17 serious crimes and both were sentenced to life imprisonment.	
Petr Zelenka	Heparin killer	2006	7	14	Life imprisonment	Male nurse in Havlíčkův Brod who murdered seven patients by lethal injection.	
Václav Mrázek	Death	1951–1956	7	Several	Executed	Convicted of killing at least seven people. While primarily sexually motivated, he also robbed his victims, and at trial, he was convicted of 127 total crimes.	
František Novotný		1888–1898	7	0	Executed	Bought a farm from the widow of serial killer Josef Englich and moved in with his wife. He gradually poisoned six children who were born to them on the farm. Unexplained deaths eventually led to the divorce and Novotný remarried. He also poisoned the son from this marriage. The motive was his general hatred of children.	
Anton Schimak	Moravian Babinský	1887	6	0	Executed	A robber murderer who, after his release from Mírov Prison murdered and robbed six people and shot a Catholic priest in just a few days.	
Karel Kopáč; Ludvík Černý; Vladimír Kuna	Orlík killers	1991–1993	5	0	Kopáč died in prison Černý: Life imprisonment Kuna released in 2013	Gang of serial killers who, between 1991 and 1993, killed five people (mostly businessmen) for monetary gain. One of the members committed a murder on his own and attempted another, but the victim in the latter attack survived.	
Hubert Pilčík		1948–1951	5	10+	Committed suicide in custody	Acted as a conduit through the Iron Curtain who killed and robbed several people he was supposed to smuggle across the border.	
Ivan Roubal		1991–1994	5	3	Died in prison	Killed for selfish reasons. He was not charged in the three murders because no bodies were found.	
Ladislav Hojer		1978–1981	5	3	Executed	Sexual murderer who committed murders during his trips around the country, making his capture much more difficult. He committed cannibalism on one of the victims.	
Oto Biederman		1993–1996	5	0	Life imprisonment	Member of the "Kolín Gang", sentenced to life imprisonment for murdering 5 people.	
Josef Englich		1885	5	0	Executed	Married on a farm in Komárov, where a widowed woman lived with her daughter, parents and grandparents. According to custom, he was supposed to pay them off and then house them in exchange and take care of them until they died. For financial reasons, he gradually poisoned all members of the household except his wife with arsenic.	
Ondrej Gažik; František Gaži; František Daniš		1990	5	0	Imprisonment	Pensioner killers. They killed their victims with objects they brought to the crime scene or found there. They also used punches and stomping on lying victims. The two attacked did not die until several days after the attack. Initially, all three perpetrators received a life sentence, Gaži and Daniš's sentence was reduced to 25 years.	
Martin Lecián	Moravian horror	1927	4	0	Executed	Murdered three policemen and a prison officer during escape attempt. He also attempted to kill seven other policemen.	
Jaroslava Fabiánová	The Czech Aileen Wuornos	1981–2003	4	0	Life imprisonment		
Jan Philopon Dambrovský		1572–1585	4	0	Executed	Roman Catholic priest and dean of the Olomouc chapter, responsible for the poisoning of four archbishops.	
Svatoslav Štěpánek	The Roudnice Monster	1926–1936	3	2+	Executed	Killed at least one child and two women around Roudnice nad Labem between 1926 and 1936. Convicted of these crimes and two attempted murders, he was sentenced to death and subsequently executed in 1938.	
Jan Janeček	Serynek	1870	3	1+	Executed	Robbed and murdered several people. Executed in 1871; last person to be publicly executed in Austria-Hungary.	
Jaroslav Malý		1986	3	1	Life imprisonment	After his release from prison, where he spent 30 months for two crimes of a violent nature, he decided to take revenge on society with one murder for every ten months of his "unjust" sentence and killed three random victims with a shot to the head. He was sentenced to death for his act, which was later commuted to life imprisonment. In prison, he likely helped a fellow inmate commit suicide.	
Karel Dvořák		1959–1973	3	0	Executed		
Miloslav Sláma		2002–2003	3	0	Life imprisonment	Brutally attacked and robbed elderly women. Four victims survived his attacks.	
Jiří Straka	Spartakiad killer	1985	3	0	Released in 2004		
David Virgulák	Taxi killer	2014	3	0	Life imprisonment	Killed three taxi drivers.	
Jaroslav Hejna		2003	3	0	Life imprisonment	Murdered three people for selfish reasons. His friend Marek Dohnal helped him remove the bodies of the first two victims.	
Michal Semanský		2009–2012	3	0	Life imprisonment	Killed during robberies in senior citizens' homes. Two of the victims were his relatives.	
Roman Horáček		1990–1991	3	0	Murdered in 2006	Murdered a doctor, his ex-wife and her sister in Litoměřice	
Karel Šťovíček		1998–2020	3	0	Life imprisonment	Caused the death of a pensioner during a robbery; after release, murdered two women in sexual encounters	

== Unidentified serial killers ==
Name	Years active	Proven victims	Possible victims	Region where active	Notes	Ref
1990–1991 Prague murders	1990–1991	3	0	Prague	Unknown killer murdered 3 women in 1990 and 1991 before going silent. Investigator of murders believes that the killer either left the country or died after the last murder.	

== Suspected serial killers ==
Name	Nickname / AKA	Years active	Proven victims	Possible victims	Status	Notes	Ref
Bohumil Vacík		1994–1995	4	1	Life imprisonment	In 1994, he killed a guard in Sokolov. Year later he murdered three members of a Vietnamese family, including a six-year-old child and a pregnant woman during one incident. Police also believed he committed another murder which was not proven to him at court due to procedural error.	
Marie Fikáčková	Sušice Monster	1957–1960	2	10+	Executed	Nurse convicted for the killing of two newborn babies in Sušice in 1960. She claimed to have killed at least ten newborns between 1957 and 1960, and was executed by hanging in 1961.	

== See also ==
- Lists of serial killers
  - List of serial killers by country
