= Bohumil Vacík =

Czech serial killer (1952–2026)

- Born: 1952; Staré Sedlo, Czechoslovakia
- Died: c. 17 July 2026 (aged 73); Pankrác Prison, Prague, Czech Republic
- Conviction: Murder ×4
- Penalty: Life imprisonment

Details
- Victims: 5
- Span of crimes: 1994–1995
- Country: Czech Republic
- Date apprehended: February 1996

Bohumil Vacík (1952 – c. 17 July 2026) was a Czech serial killer who was convicted of killing four people in Sokolov and Chodov from 1994 to 1995. He was convicted of these murders in August 1996 and sentenced to life imprisonment.

== Background ==
Vacík was born in 1952 in Staré Sedlo in Czechoslovakia. He graduated from elementary school and was trained as a agricultural machine repairman. In 1973, he began working for the Sbor národní bezpečnosti (SNB), but in 1974 he suffered a serious injury that left him unable to work for almost a year. He then worked for the SNB in the passport and visa department. He was then forced to leave the police after failing to repay several loans.

In 1979, Vacík started working as a locksmith. For some time, he also serviced locomotives in Vřesová. After the Velvet Revolution, he worked as a salesman and was also granted a partial disability pension. He also tried to start a business. However, his business plans did not work out, which led to problems with debts. Vacík appeared confident in public and tried to appear as a successful businessman. He was married and, according to his later statements, had several daughters.

== Murders ==
Early in the morning of 19 December 1994, Vacík asked his friend and colleague Jan Hejduk to lend him a CZ 75 firearm. According to one version, the colleague refused to lend him the firearm, after which Vacík attacked him and took the weapon in a scuffle. He then shot Hejduk twice in the head. Another version states that the colleague eventually lent him the weapon at least for inspection, and only then did the shooting take place. Vacík then fled and eluded the police with the stolen weapon.

In the early hours of 11 January 1995, Vacík arrived at the apartment of Vietnamese businessman Tien Minn Too, who had lent him 28,000 CZK ($1054.98 USD) two months earlier. Upon arriving at his apartment, he first informed him that he wanted to hand over the amount owed to him. However, upon entering the kitchen, Vacík pointed a pistol at him, which he had stolen from the doorman he had murdered a month earlier, and threatened to shoot him. He then shot Minn Too, fatally wounding him. He then shot and killed Minn Too's six-year-old daughter, who had seen the incident. According to footage later broadcast by TV Nova, Vacík had a very warm relationship with her. He then murdered Minn Too's wife, who was staying in the apartment and was nine months pregnant, with a single shot to the head as he left.

On the same evening, Vacík robbed a Lišov gas station of 25 thousand CZK. During the robbery, he seriously injured station attendant Milena Puchingerová, who died of her injuries the next day. After the murder, he remained at the gas station and served a customer.

== Capture ==
Vacík was not caught immediately after the crime, and on 14 January he was still walking around Minn Too's house, in which he had committed the murders. At that time, there were criminal investigators in and around the house investigating the case (the bodies of the victims were only found on 14 January). He was also supposed to have attended a police ball. Although the police initially did not connect the individual cases and believed that the murder of Minn Too could be a dispute within the Vietnamese community, ballistic tests eventually showed that all the victims had been shot with the same weapon. Over time, the police also identified Vacík as one of the main suspects, as he knew Minn Too's family well and visited them.

Vacík was finally arrested more than a year after his actions, in February 1996. He immediately confessed to his actions.

== Wife's suicide ==
On 2 March 1996, his wife, a kindergarten teacher, committed suicide by poisoning herself with town gas after Vacík's actions became known. After receiving news of her death, Vacík reportedly accepted the fact without any major reaction. Not long after, his father-in-law died of a stroke.

== Conviction and death ==
During the trial, Vacík was described by experts in the field of psychiatry and psychology as a personality suffering from polymorphic psychopathy with aggressive, schizoid and hysterical manifestations. He was also found to have a tendency towards hypochondriacal experiences and neurotic reactions, and an IQ slightly above average. The experts stated that the injury he had suffered 20 years earlier and his subsequent partial disability were not the cause of his crimes.

In August 1996, Vacík was sentenced to life imprisonment by the Plzeň Regional Court for four murders and illegal possession of weapons. He did not appeal the verdict. However, he was said to have been sweating and shaking profusely during the verdict. According to his later words, he suffered from ankylosing spondylitis. He was not convicted in the murder of another person, a gas station attendant, only because the investigation of that murder was found to have violated the law.

In 2011, Vacík was placed in Mírov Prison, at which time he was said to be suffering from colon cancer. In September 2013, he unsuccessfully requested to be transferred to a prison with a milder regime.

On 17 July 2026, it was announced that Vacík had died.

== See also ==
- List of Czech serial killers
- List of serial killers by country
