= Karel Šťovíček =

Czech serial killer (1977-)

- Born: 1977 (age 48–49); Czechoslovakia
- Convictions: Accessory to murder (1999); Verbal threats against an official (1990s/2000s); Murder (x2; 2021)
- Penalty: 14 years imprisonment (1999); 2 years imprisonment (1990s/2000s); Life imprisonment (2021)

Details
- Victims: 3
- Span of crimes: 1998–2020
- Country: Czech Republic
- Date apprehended: For the final time on 7 August 2020

Karel Šťovíček (born 1977) is a Czech serial killer. He murdered two women in the Bohemian Paradise region in 2021, after being released from a previous accessory to murder conviction dating back to 1998. For his new crimes, he would later be convicted and sentenced to life imprisonment.

== Early life and first murder ==
Little is known about Šťovíček's life prior to his crimes, aside from the fact that he was born in 1977. At the advent of his teenage years, he began stealing and was repeatedly incarcerated on charges of property theft and fraudulent sale of stolen cars. One notable incident was when a teenaged Šťovíček stabbed his mother in the back with a knife after she tried to intervene in a dispute between him and his stepfather, but he was not prosecuted for this attack. In the late 1990s, he and his girlfriend Věra Vondrová began sneaking into the apartments of rich men and drugging them with rohypnol before stealing any valuables they could find.

In 1998, just two months after being released from yet another prison stint, Šťovíček and Vondrová attempted to rob a 63-year-old pensioner named Josef B., whom they came across in a pub in Branžež. After seducing the drunken man, Vondrová was allowed into his apartment, and when she thought that Josef fell asleep, she opened the door for Šťovíček. However, Josef was not asleep and was alerted, prompting the pair to stuff a handkerchief in his mouth and tie his limbs up with a towel and ropes, and then placing face down against a pillow. Josef then slowly suffocated to death.

The pair were quickly arrested for this crime, but Šťovíček initially denied it, trying to pin the blame on a group of Ukrainians who lived in the apartment. This was dismissed, but as the death was later determined to be unintentional, Šťovíček was convicted of the lesser charge of accessory to murder and sentenced to 14 years imprisonment. While imprisoned, he was repeatedly beaten and isolated by fellow inmates, and at one point he even sent a threatening letter to the prison director, for which he had his sentence extended by two years.

After serving out the sentence in full, Šťovíček moved in with a new girlfriend, with whom he had three children. Sometime after his release, he was informed that he received land and cash worth millions of korunas from his stepfather's inheritance, stemming from his old pig feedlot business. However, he gradually lost all of it due to his own mismanagement and alcoholism. Regulars at the "U Alenky" bar would later testify that Šťovíček often bought drinks exclusively for people who did not know of his past, in an apparent attempt to gain more friends.

== New murders ==
On 25 July 2020, Šťovíček was hanging out in "U Alenky" when he encountered 35-year-old Lucie J., whom he invited to accompany him on a walk to a nearby park in Rovensko pod Troskami. Lucie, who had recently gotten into an argument with her boyfriend, accepted his offer. When they were alone, Šťovíček forced Lucie to perform oral sex and then decided to kill her after she threatened to report him to the police. To do this, he bludgeoned her on the back of the head with a wine bottle he was carrying with him and then strangled her with a waist belt. In order to dispose of the body, he then carried it to a nearby field and left it there, where it was found two days later. Investigators alleged that after committing the murder, Šťovíček looked up "Life imprisonment" on the internet.

Less than two weeks later, shortly after midnight on 5 August, Šťovíček was at the "Nový život" pub when he came across 39-year-old Stanislava H., whom he asked to accompany him for a walk along the banks of the Jizera river. Stanislava agreed, and after accompanying him to a bank outside Turnov, Šťovíček forced to perform oral sex and then strangled her with the strap of her own purse. He then threw her body into the river, where it was found on the same day by a passer-by.

== Arrest, trial and imprisonment ==
Šťovíček was considered the prime suspect in both cases, but could only be arrested two days after the murder of Stanislava due to the fact that investigators lacked enough evidence to charge him. Upon his arrest, he immediately confessed responsibility to both killings. The fact that he was not detained after the first murder led to public outrage, with GIBS initiating an investigation into the conduct of the people involved in the investigation.

Šťovíček's trial was scheduled to begin in April 2021, but it did not take place in the end, as he accepted a plea deal from the prosecutor and was sentenced to life imprisonment with a chance of parole after 30 years. The head prosecutor, Lenka Faltusová, noted that while he did not suffer from any apparent mental illness, Šťovíček was incapable of reintegrating into society.

While Šťovíček willingly admitted responsibility for the crimes, he argued that it should have been reduced to twenty years instead. In addition to this, he waived his right to appeal the sentence and agreed to pay 11 million koruny in damages to the victims' family members.

== See also ==
- List of serial killers active in the 2020s
- List of Czech serial killers
