= Sláma =

Sláma (feminine: Slámová) is a Czech surname, meaning 'straw'. The surname probably originated from the colour of the bearer's hair. A similar Slovak surname with the same meaning and an Anglicised form of Sláma is Slama. Notable people with the surname include:

- Bohdan Sláma (born 1967), Czech film director
- František Sláma (musician) (1923–2004), Czech musician
- František Sláma (politician) (1850–1917), Czech writer and politician
- Igor Sláma (born 1959), Czech cyclist
- Miloslav Sláma (born 1970), Czech serial killer
- Miroslav Sláma (1917–2008), Czech ice hockey player
- Zdeněk Sláma (born 1982), Czech futsal player
