= Špaček =

Špaček (Czech pronunciation: [ˈʃpatʃɛk]) is a Czech surname (the feminine form is Špačková), which means 'starling'. The surnames Spacek and Spatzek are derived from it. Notable people include:

== Špaček ==
- Daniel Špaček, Czech ice hockey player
- David Špaček, Czech ice hockey player
- Jaroslav Špaček, Czech ice hockey player
- Josef Špaček (politician) Czechoslovak communist reformer
- Otto Spacek, Czech World War II veteran
- Radim Špaček, Czech film director

== Spacek ==
- Sissy Spacek, American actress
- Steve Spacek, musician
- Jimmy Spacek, musician

== Spatzek ==
- Andrea Spatzek (born 1959), Austrian actress
- Christian Spatzek (born 1956), Austrian actor

== See also ==
- Spacek (disambiguation)
