= František Slunečko =

Czech army general (1886-1963)

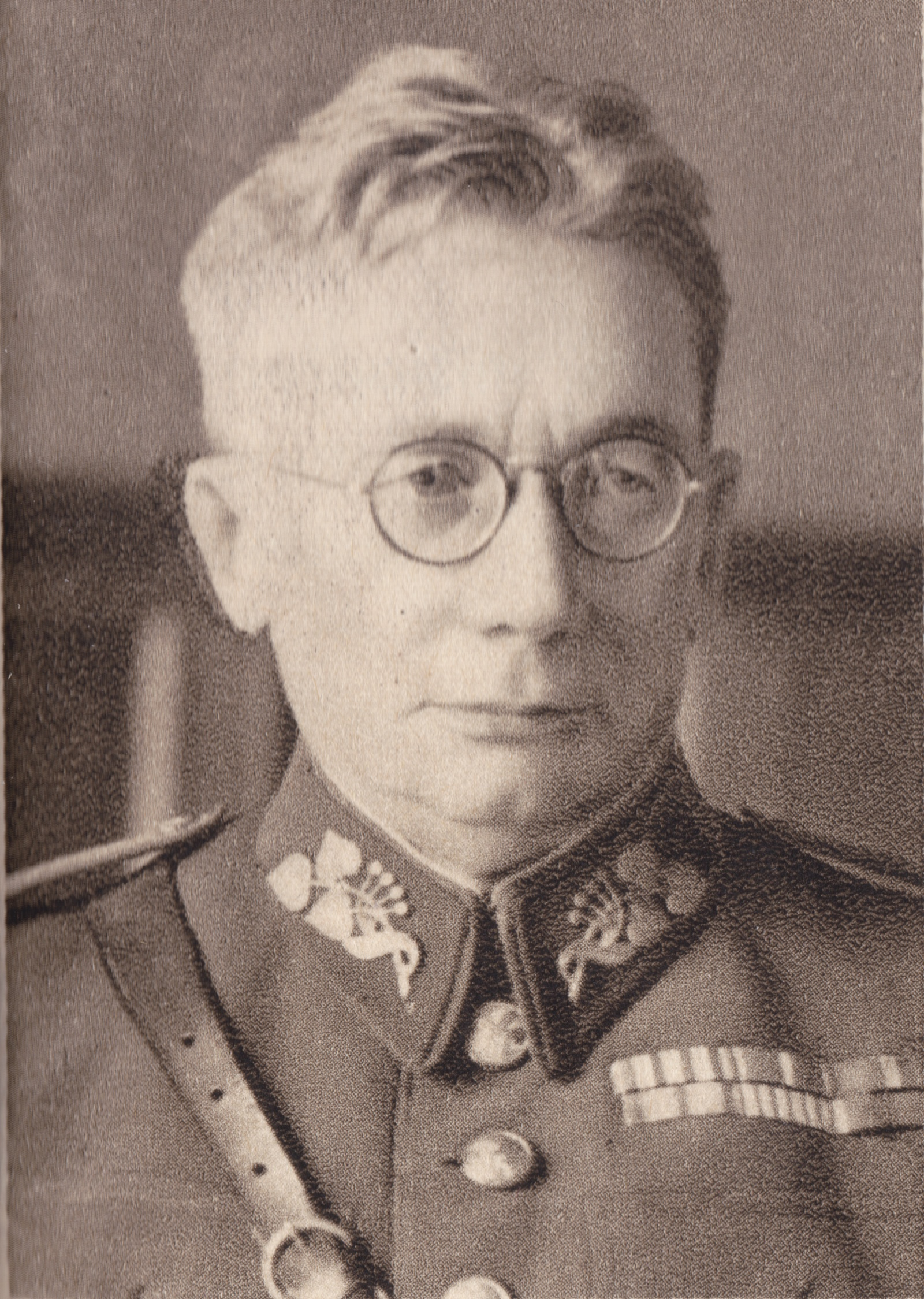
General František Slunečko

František Slunečko (2 October 1886, Mladá Vožice – 10 December 1963, Prague) was a Czech general, a member of the World War II resistance group Defense of the Nation, and the military commander of Bohemia during the Prague Uprising 1945.

== Early life and education ==
František Slunečko graduated from the grammar school in České Budějovice in 1905 and received a degree in mechanical engineering from the Czech Technical University in 1909. He began his basic military service on 1 October 1910 in Sankt Pölten (Saint Hypolit), Austria; spent a year at a military school in Linz; served briefly as a platoon commander; and then took a job with the state post office.

== Military career ==
After the mobilization in July 1914, he was called up to service in the Austro-Hungarian army on 3 August 1914. In October his unit was sent to the Russian front; on 21 December 1914 he was captured by the Russians. At the POW camp in Pokrov, he was involved in the prisoners’ self-government, and in July 1916 he voluntarily joined the Serbian army, in which he was named a platoon commander. In December of that year he became a member of the officers’ staff under General J. Cervinka and on 12 June 1917, he was appointed to command the 8th Rifle Regiment. After a brief period of study at the school of trench warfare in Jassách, he was promoted to the rank of captain and appointed battalion commander on 29 August 1918.

Returning to Czechoslovakia as a major in the summer of 1920, he became deputy commander of the 8th Infantry Regiment, and on 17 November 1922 was named its commander. Between 1924 and 1928 he took courses for senior commanders, and in early 1929 was appointed commander of the 16th Infantry Brigade in Místek; in the summer of that year he was promoted to the rank of general. In 1930 he became deputy commander of the Provincial Military Command in Košice, and later served, in turn, as commander of the brigade in Znojmo, as deputy commander of the division in Brno, and as commander of the II. group. He was in the last-named post at the time of the mobilization in September 1938.

=== Anti-German resistance ===
After the March 1939 occupation, several generals and senior officers of the Czech army established an illegal military resistance group called Defense of the Nation (ON). Slunečko became the regional military commander of Moravia-West, based in Brno, and headed the Alex intelligence group under the code name of General Slunecek.

The command of ON was almost totally destroyed between 1939 and 1941 as the Gestapo gradually arrested and executed many of its members. The group's remaining leaders regrouped in Bohemia and Moravia under Zdeněk Novák; after further arrests, Slunečko became the leader of ON and relocated to Prague, where he appointed General Kutlvašr as commander of the capital. After the start of the Prague Uprising, Alex placed itself under the leadership of the Czech National Council (CNR).

=== Prague Uprising ===
On 5 May 1945 General Slunečko ordered the Prague military headquarters, "Bartos," and all units outside Prague to revolt against the Nazi occupiers. At 11 A.M., under his direction, the Czech police occupied the radio, telephone exchange, railway station, main post office, and other strategic locations in the city. The Prague Uprising fully broke out at about noon. On 8 May Slunečko headed a delegation of the Czech National Council to which the German occupiers surrendered in Český Brod. After Karel Kutlvašr's liberation from the prison in Pankrác, he took command of all units at Alex's headquarters and Slunečko became his deputy.

=== After the war ===
After VE Day, Alex was closed down and on 25 May František Slunečko, now a brigadier general, was appointed provisional commander of the first army corps in Prague. On 28 October he was named commander and promoted to the rank of divisional general. He retired on 1 June 1946. Like many former officers and resistance fighters, he later faced various provocations, charges, and investigations. Although he was not convicted of anything, after being released from custody of the State Court, he was demoted to the rank of private in 1950 and was forced to move from Prague to Branžež.
