= Slama =

Slama (feminine: Slamová) is a Slovak surname and an Anglicised form of the Czech surname Sláma, both meaning 'straw'. It is also an Arabic surname and feminine given name, meaning 'peace'. Notable people with the surname include:

- Abdelhamid Slama (1941–2025), Tunisian politician
- Amir Slama (born 1965), Brazilian fashion designer
- Angelika Slamová (born 1994), Slovak basketball player
- Anthony Slama (born 1984), American baseball player
- Mechket Slama, Tunisian magistrate and politician
- Julie Slama (born 1996), American politician
