= Roman Horáček =

Czechoslovak serial killer and victim of unsolved murder

- Born: 1969; Litoměřice, Czechoslovakia
- Died: April–July 2006 (aged 37); Římov Reservoir, Czech Republic
- Cause of death: Undetermined, considered a homicide
- Conviction: Murder x2
- Penalty: 15 years imprisonment

Details
- Victims: 3 (2 convictions)
- Span of crimes: 1990–1991
- Country: Czechoslovakia
- Date apprehended: 1991

Roman Horáček (1969–2006) was a Czechoslovak serial killer who murdered three women in his hometown of Litoměřice between 1990 and 1991. He was later linked to one of the murders via DNA but was never convicted of it.

Horáček went on the run to escape charges for his first murder, and was himself murdered at an unknown date, as his body was found in 2006. His murder remains unsolved.

== Early life ==
Little is known about Horáček's early life. Born in 1969 in Litoměřice, he supposedly committed his first violent offense at age 12, when it was alleged that he stabbed his neighbor with a hunting knife. However, he was not tried for this crime due to his young age.

== Murders ==
According to investigators, in 1990 Horáček murdered doctor Libuše Lednická at her office in Litoměřice, where he worked as an orderly, and then set the room on fire. While he was considered the only suspect in the case and his DNA was found at the crime scene, authorities could not arrest him at the time due to the limitations of forensic science at the time. Shortly after his release for his latter crimes, however, Horáček provided another DNA sample, which this time successfully confirmed that he was indeed the culprit. An arrest warrant was issued for him in July 2004.

In January 1991, Horáček murdered his ex-wife and her sister in their family home, strangling them both and then placing their bodies in bathtubs on different floors of the house. The apparent motive for the murders was jealousy, as Horáček wanted to rekindle his relationship with his ex-wife, who had started dating another man. Despite denying responsibility for the double murder and claiming that he was simply inside the house, he was convicted and sentenced to 15 years imprisonment for this crime. Horáček was paroled in July 2004 before fully completing his sentence.

== Death ==
Shortly after being released, Horáček went on the run from police, hiding out in České Budějovice with his former cellmate. Together, they were known to have repeatedly committed burglaries in the area.

Sometime in April 2006, Horáček got into an argument with his accomplice while they were having dinner in a pub. According to the accomplice's testimony, he hit Horáček with a wooden bar and loaded his body into his car, abandoning him at the Římov Reservoir. The body remained undiscovered until July 24, when it was accidentally found during a search for a victim in an unrelated crime. While the body initially remained unidentified until October of that year, coroners were able to establish that Horáček was severely beaten - he had multiple fractures, strangulation marks, blood spurts and broken ribs - before being thrown into the reservoir, but were unable to establish whether he succumbed to his injuries or drowned. Moreover, he was handcuffed and his body was suspended with a thirty-pound weight.

Investigators immediately suspected that he was murdered by his former cellmate, but as he denied killing Horáček and they had no conclusive evidence to prove otherwise, the man was never charged.

== In media ==
The Horáček case was covered on an episode of Záhady Josefa Klímy ("Josef Klíma's mysteries").

== See also ==
- List of unsolved murders (2000–present)
- List of Czech serial killers
