= Miloslav Sláma =

Czech serial killer

- Born: 19 January 1970 (age 56); Domažlice, Czechoslovakia
- Conviction: Murder x3
- Penalty: Life imprisonment

Details
- Victims: 3
- Span of crimes: 2002–2003
- Country: Czech Republic
- Date apprehended: 2003

Miloslav Sláma (born 19 January 1970) is a Czech serial killer and robber. He murdered three pensioners during robberies in Prague from 2002 to 2003. In addition to the killings, he was also responsible for a multitude of thefts, robberies and other crimes beginning in 2001.

Sláma was later charged, successfully convicted, and sentenced to life imprisonment.

== Early life ==
Sláma was born on 19 January 1970 in Domažlice. Reportedly, Sláma had a normal childhood and had a close relationship with his three sisters. The only negative aspect of his upbringing was the fact that his parents divorced early due to his father's alcohol problems – Miloslav met him for the first time when he became an adult.

He spent his childhood and youth in the city, studying at a local elementary school with the intention of being a painter. After finishing his studies, Sláma worked as a driver for Škoda Auto and as a fare inspector for the Plzeň Public Transportation Company. During this period, he married and had a son, but the couple later divorced.

After the divorce, Sláma started struggling with alcoholism and developed a gambling addiction. He later met a new partner, with whom he had a daughter. Gradually, however, he fell into debt, and due to financial hardship following his dismissal from his job, he decided to start committing crimes. At the time, he intermittently with his sister in Žlutice, before he permanently moved to Prague.

Neighbors described Sláma negatively, depicting him as a violent and aggressive man who physically assaulted those around him, often without any apparent provocation, often targeting those weaker than him.

== Crimes ==
In the 1990s, Sláma made a living from selling postcards and stuffed animals, claiming that they had been made by children with disabilities and that the proceeds from the sales would go to these children; in reality, however, he kept the money for himself.

Sláma's first recorded robbery was in October 2001, in Plzeň – the victim was a retiree who had just withdrawn a significant amount of cash from an ATM. In this case, Sláma did not physically harm the victim, but managed to steal the money under the threat of stabbing the man. From that point on, he exclusively targeted female victims. Sláma committed two more robberies in the city and one more in Klatovy that same year, after which he moved to Prague.

Following his capture, Sláma was determined to have committed a total of 84 criminal offenses, including 27 robberies, 7 thefts, 41 counts of trespassing, two counts of fraud, four counts of attempted murder and three murders. In total, over the course of his life, he mugged 34 elderly women and one man, whom he targeted near banks, post offices, or stores when they were carrying large amounts of money and whom he believed lived by themselves.

=== Murders ===
As part of his modus operandi, Sláma would select elderly women he saw on the street and then followed them to their apartments. He then rang the doorbell, whereupon he would present himself in a very respectful manner and pretend to be acquainted with a relative of the victim. In at least one case, he bought a bouquet of flowers for the victim.

Sláma would then ask for a pencil and some paper, supposedly to write a message for the relative, after which his victims often invited him inside. Once he gained entry, he would proceed to viciously assault the victims, beating, strangling and kicking them. He would then tie and gag their mouths, or place duct tape or the victims' scarves on their mouths.

Sláma would then bind them to a chair or armchair, after which he ransacked the apartment for any money or valuables. Once he was finished, he would simply leave the crime scene, leaving the victims behind.

==== Maria Malá ====
On 11 March 2002, Sláma spotted 82-year-old Maria Malá returning to her home from a shopping trip. After she entered her apartment on Svatoslavova Street, he decided to ring her doorbell. When Malá opened the door, Sláma pretended that he needed to borrow a pencil, but then proceeded to physically assault her and tie her up. Malá was found still alive several days later, after neighbors noticed that she was not picking her up mail or going outside. She was rushed to the nearest hospital, where she succumbed to organ failure thirteen days later due to the sustained injuries and dehydration.

==== Růžena Bernášková ====
On 20 January 2003, Sláma strangled 91-year-old Růžena Bernášková inside her apartment on Maroldova Street after gaining access under the same pretense of borrowing a pencil. He then stole 950 CZK, which Bernášková had withdrawn from a Česká spořitelna bank.

==== Jana Hovorková ====
On 30 August 2003, Sláma murdered 82-year-old Jana Hovorková at her apartment in Prague 4, again after gaining access to her apartment by claiming that he needed to a pencil. Her son later discovered Hovorková's body in her apartment, bearing signs of suffocation and with several fractures. Officers from the local police department described the assault on Hovorková as one of the worst that they had seen up until that point – Hovorková had a scarf stuffed down her throat, and her killer had broken multiple bones including her sternum, a vertebra and one rib.

== Arrest and trial ==
Prior to Sláma's arrest, Prague police erroneously detained an unnamed 29-year-old man for one of the murders and approximately nine robberies. The man was an unemployed ex-convict with a record for arson who lived off of his disability pension. For unknown reasons, the man initially confessed to the crime despite inaccuracies with evidence before recanting his testimony in July 2004. Following the Hovorková murder, all charges related to the crimes against the man were dropped, but he was later charged with fraud in an unrelated case. It is unclear what happened to him afterwards.

Sláma was arrested soon after the murder of Hovorková, and charged with the two other murders and a multitude of other crimes. He underwent a forensic psychiatric examination prior to the trial, which concluded that he was an egoist with a histrionic personality disorder and low social intelligence.

Throughout the trial, Sláma often broke down in tears and claimed that he never intended to kill the victims, only wanting to steal their money. When asked about the physical assaults, he claimed that no such thing occurred and that the surviving victims' memories had been distorted and that they were senile. When asked about his motive for the crime spree, Sláma claimed that it was due to his unemployment and gambling addiction.

In contrast, prosecutors described Sláma as callous and indifferent to the suffering of others, often comparing his crimes to those of Jaroslav Stodola and Dana Stodolová. They also stated four of the surviving victims were still alive only thanks to sheer luck. Some of these surviving victims later testified against Sláma at his trial, including 87-year-old Antonie Kruglová and 84-year-old Josefa Pánková.

In July 2004, a procedural mistake resulted in a significant delay to Sláma's trial. On 14 July, he gave testimony about he carried out the crimes, which the prosecution was supposed to record on a recording device. However, due to a technical malfunction, Sláma was asked to repeat his testimony in entirety on the following day, which he agreed to do.

== Sentence and imprisonment ==
In October 2004, the Prague Municipal Court sentenced Sláma to life imprisonment after finding him guilty on almost all counts. In regards to his first fatal assault, despite the suffering of Malá, it was ruled to be a death caused by bodily harm resulting in death and thus not classified as murder. He was additionally acquitted of the two fraud charges because the stolen amount did not amount to 5,000 koruny.

Sláma later appealed the verdict, but in March 2005, the Prague High Court upheld his life sentence. He remains incarcerated to this day, and is eligible to apply for parole in 2034.

== In the media and culture ==
The Sláma case was covered on an episode of the podcast Hlasy zločinu ('voices of crime'), hosted by journalist Václav Janata, which was posted in October 2025.

== See also ==
- List of Czech serial killers
