= Jeunesses Musicales Czech Republic =

- Founded: 1971
- Type: Non - profit, Non - governmental, Interest group
- Location: Prague
- Fields: Youth, Music, Art, Dance, Photography
- Members: over 7000
- Website: https://www.hudebnimladez.cz

Jeunesses Musicales Czech Republic (JMCR) is non-profit, non-governmental organization for young people interested in culture and art, including music, theatre, dance, film, and fine art. It is a member of Jeunesses Musicales International network.

== History ==
JMCR was established in 1971, with composer František Kovaříček as the first president. In 1999 the board of JMCR was elected during a national conference of JMCR members. In 2003 a new level of cooperation was established between JMCR and Jeunesses Musicales International.

Jaroslav Ježek Friends Society was founded by JMCR, together with the Jaroslav Ježek Conservatory in Prague, on 25 September 2006, to celebrate Ježek's legacy.

== Events ==
JMCR organise a number of festivals, including the young Smetana's Litomyšl, Days of music in Prague, Rainbow Storm in Liberec, a poetry festival in Rakovník, Stairs of Příbram International Imagine festival in Příbram, and a festival of music theatre in Hradec Králové called Prkna.

The organisation also runs workshops in dancing, lyrics and photography, as well as summer schools in Třeboň and Poděbrady, and a winter film school in Prague
