= František Kovaříček =

Czech composer (1924–2003)

- Born: 17 May 1924; Litětiny, Czechoslovakia
- Died: 7 January 2003 (aged 78); Prague, Czech Republic
- Occupations: Composer, music teacher

František Kovaříček (17 May 1924 – 7 January 2003) was a Czech composer and music teacher.

== Life and career ==
Kovaříček received his primary education at Hradec Králové and studied music privately with Karel Boleslav Jirák. After the Second World War he studied composition with Emil Hlobil at the Prague Conservatory from 1945 to 1949. He continued his studies at the Academy of Performing Arts under Jaroslav Řídký, graduating in 1952. At the same time, he studied musicology at the Charles University in Prague. Kovaříček was music director of Czechoslovak Radio in Prague (1953–1957) and later a freelance composer. From 1966 to 1985, he taught music at the Prague Conservatory, where he was later the director (1990–1991). In 1971 he became the president of the Jeunesses Musicales Czech Republic.

== Music ==
Kovaříček was a neoclassical composer, primarily of chamber and orchestral music. His most notable work is the opera Ukradený měsíc based on text by Ludvík Aškenazy (libretto by Vladimír Mikeš) which premiered on Czechoslovak Radio in 1971.
