= Komarov =

Komarov may refer to:

- Komarov (surname), a Russian surname
- Komárov (disambiguation), places in the Czech Republic and Slovakia
- Komarov (volcano), a volcano in Russia
- Komarov (crater), a crater on the Moon
- 1836 Komarov, an asteroid
- Komarov Botanical Institute in Saint Petersburg, Russia
- Soviet ship Kosmonavt Vladimir Komarov, a satellite tracking ship

== See also ==
- Komar (disambiguation)
- Komarovo
