= Zdeněk Novák =

Czech army officer (1891-1988)

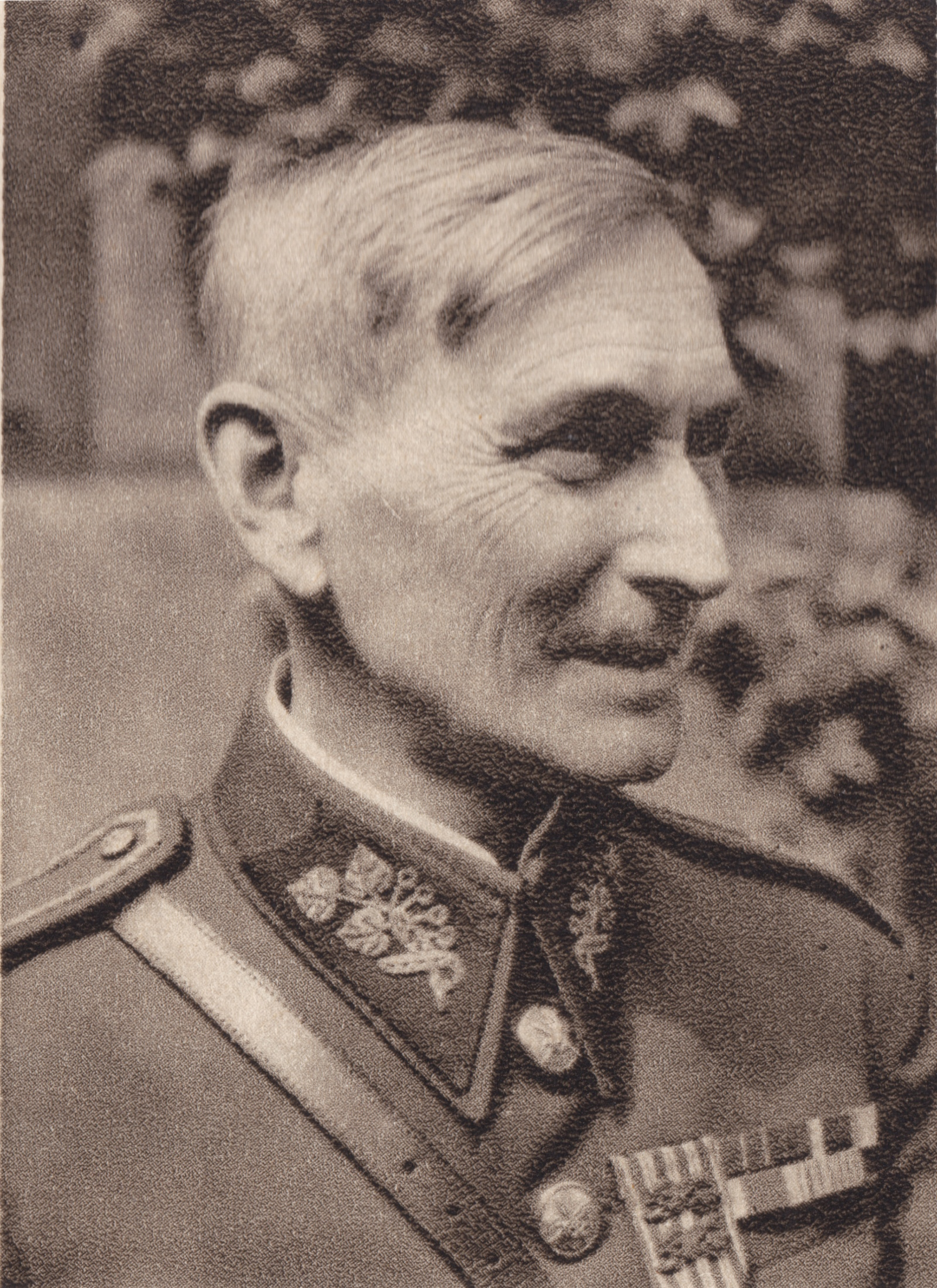
General Zdeněk Novák. Picture taken on May 10th, 1945.

Zdeněk Novák (April 2, 1891, Paskov, Frýdek-Místek District, Austro-Hungarian Empire - October 23, 1988, Zadní Třebaň, Czechoslovakia) was a Czech military officer who served in the Austro-Hungarian army, in the Czechoslovak Army, and as a resistance fighter in World War II.

== Early life and education ==
Novák was born on April 2, 1891, in the village of Paskov. From September 1901 to June 1905 he attended the State Lower Gymnasium, Místek. From September 1905 to June 1907 he attended business school in Uherské Hradiště. From September 1908 to July 1909 he attended the State High School in Brno. From October 1909 to July 1910 he studied at the University of Agriculture in Berlin.

In October 1910 he chose to interrupt his studies and volunteered for a year's service in artillery regiment 27 in Josefov, where he studied at a school for reserve artillery officers from December 1910 to May 1911. From May to September 1911, he was an artillery platoon commander in Field Cannon Regiment No. 29, Josefov. On October 1, 1911, he was named a cadet in the Austro-Hungarian armed forces. Instead of returning to university, he worked as a brewer.

== World War I ==
After the outbreak of World War I, he joined Artillery Regiment 39 in Varaždin, and was named an Ensign in the Austro-Hungarian armed forces on August 1, 1914. He served on the Serbian front, where he held various positions in the field before being named commander of the battery. On November 1, he was named a Lieutenant in the Austro-Hungarian Armed Forces.

In February 1915, his unit, renamed Field Artillery Regiment 36, moved to the Russian front. Novák stayed with the unit until the end of March 1916, when he was transferred to Regiment Field Militia 42. In early June 1916, by now a lieutenant, he was taken prisoner by the Russians, who released him in July 1917. On the first of that month he was named a lieutenant. After graduating in October 1917 from an officer's course in Borispol he became a junior officer in the 3rd battery of the 2nd MS. separate artillery section. In September 1918 he was promoted to captain and on December 21 became a major.

In early April 1919, he took command of the 3rd MS. light artillery regiment, and at the end of the same month he became the commander of artillery of the 3rd MS. Rifle Division. In 1920 he was promoted to Lieutenant Colonel. He returned to Czechoslovakia in August 1920.

In November 1920, he went to Košice to command the 11th Field Artillery Brigade. He remained in that position until February 1929, being promoted to colonel in December 1921 and Brigadier General on May 4, 1928. From May to July 1924, he took a course for generals and colonels in Olumouc; from October to December 1924, he took a course for general and colonels in Versailles; from November 1928 to July 1929 he pursued further studies in Prague.

He was named commander of the 8th Field Artillery Brigade, headquartered in Opava and, after October 1931, in Hranice. In October 1935 took command of the IV. Artillery Corps in Olomouc and in December 1937 was named commander of the Provincial Military Artillery in Brno.

== World War II ==
When Neville Chamberlain agreed at Munich to allow the Nazis to invade Czechoslovakia, Novák was commander of artillery in the 2nd Army in Olomouc. After the occupation of the Sudetenland he joined the military resistance organization Defense of the Nation. He managed to evade arrest, and after the Nazis occupied the rest of Czechoslovakia, when most of the organization's leaders were arrested by the Germans, Novák became its head in early 1942. He succeeded in resurrecting the organization, but was arrested by the Gestapo on June 22, 1944, and imprisoned at Pankrac.

Interrogated repeatedly and tortured at length at Petschek Palace, he did not disclose the names of his fellow resistance members, and on May 5, 1945, he was freed from prison by Prague insurgents. Despite his ill health, he was involved in the operations of the rebel group Alex, which had been commanded by General František Slunečko.

== Postwar ==
At the end of May 1945, the war in Europe over, he became commander of the 3rd area in Brno, headed until August 1950, and was promoted, first, to Divisional General and then to General of the Army. Subsequently, he was appointed commander of the 2nd Military District.

On January 3, 1951, he was arrested in one of the many Eastern bloc purges engineered by Stalin; he was released from active military service on October 31 of that year and reduced to the rank of Private. In 1954 the Supreme Court sentenced him to 18 years in prison for high treason, but he was pardoned by the President of the Republic in September 1956.

In 1967 he was restored to his full military rank and honors. Novák died on October 23, 1988, in Zadní Třebáň.

== Honors and awards ==
- 1919 Order of St Stanislaus 2nd Class with Swords
- 1919 Croix de Guerre
- 1919 Order of Falcon with Swords
- 1921 Victory Medal
- 1921 Czechoslovak Revolutionary Medal
- 1921 War Cross 1918
