= Slavošov =

- Municipality
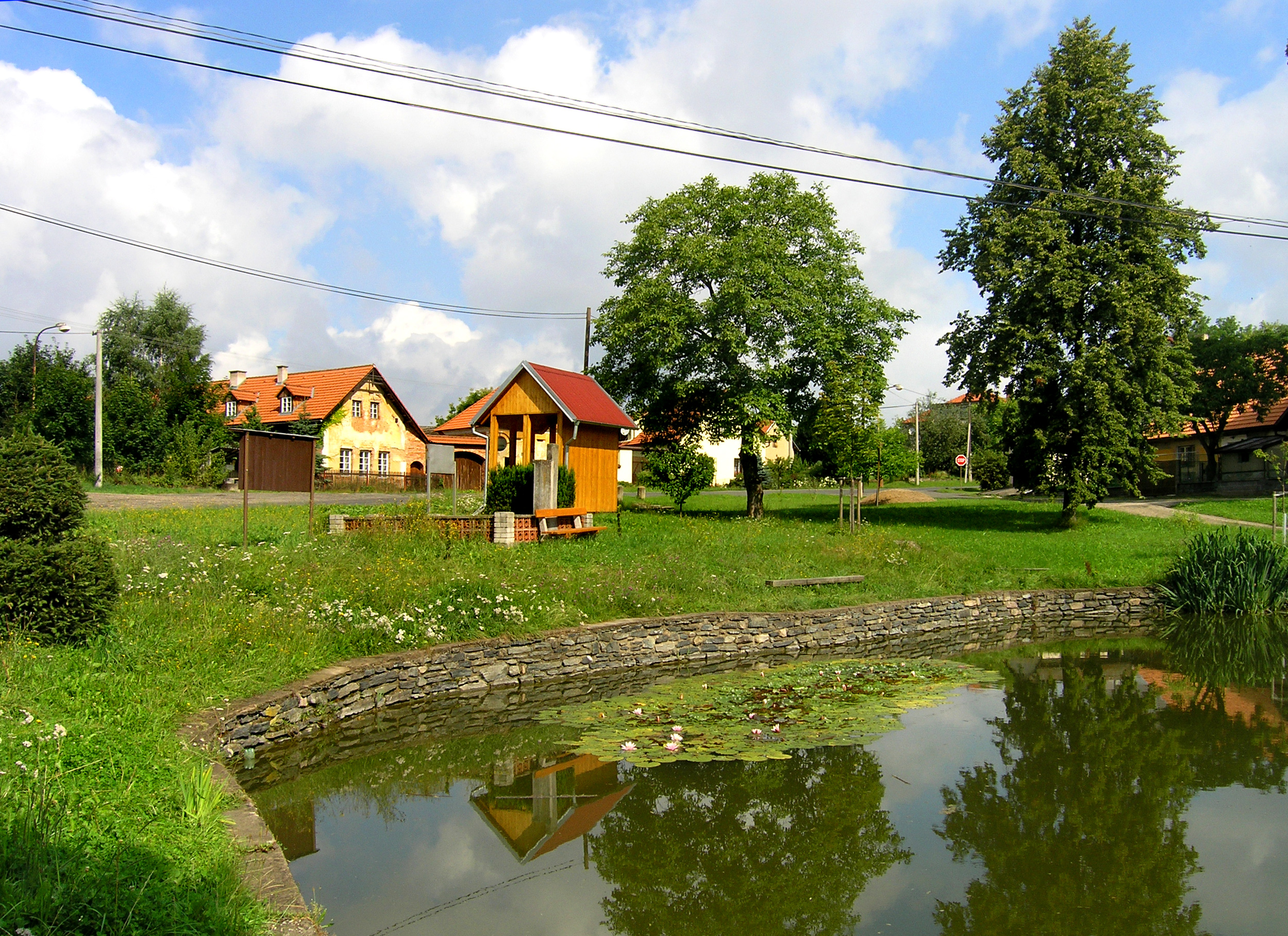
- Hranice, a part of Slavošov

- Location in the Czech Republic
- Coordinates: 49°45′44″N 15°9′7″E
- Country: Czech Republic
- Region: Central Bohemian
- District: Kutná Hora
- First mentioned: 1323

Area
  - Total: 7.59 km^{2} (2.93 sq mi)
- Elevation: 425 m (1,394 ft)

Population (2026-01-01)
  - Total: 145
  - Density: 19.1/km^{2} (49.5/sq mi)
- Time zone: UTC+1 (CET)
  - Summer (DST): UTC+2 (CEST)
- Postal code: 285 22
- Website: www.slavosov.cz

Slavošov is a municipality and village in Kutná Hora District in the Central Bohemian Region of the Czech Republic. It has about 100 inhabitants.

== Administrative division ==
Slavošov consists of three municipal parts (in brackets population according to the 2021 census):

- Slavošov (58)
- Hranice (91)
- Věžníkov (6)

== Demographics ==
Historical population
Year	Pop.	±%
1869	706	—
1880	625	−11.5%
1890	622	−0.5%
1900	640	+2.9%
1910	611	−4.5%
1921	580	−5.1%
1930	503	−13.3%
1950	407	−19.1%
1961	340	−16.5%
1970	313	−7.9%
1980	229	−26.8%
1991	196	−14.4%
2001	163	−16.8%
2011	135	−17.2%
2021	155	+14.8%
Source: Censuses

== Notable people ==
- Jaroslav Stodola and Dana Stodolová (born 1966 and 1970), serial killers; lived here
