= Spacek =

Spacek may refer to:

== Surname ==
- Špaček, Czech surname
- Sissy Spacek, American actress
- Steve Spacek, musician
- Jaroslav Špaček, ice hockey player

== Music ==
- Spacek (band), a British electronic music band
- Ulrika Spacek, a German-English alternative rock band

== Aircraft ==
- Spacek SD-1 Minisport, a Czech amateur-built aircraft
