= David Virgulák =

Czech serial killer

- Born: 1981 (age 44–45); Prague, Czechoslovakia
- Other name: The Taxi Killer
- Convictions: Theft x20 Murder x3
- Penalty: Life imprisonment

Details
- Victims: 3
- Span of crimes: January – April 2014
- Country: Czech Republic
- State: Prague
- Date apprehended: May 2015

David Virgulák (born 1981), known as The Taxi Killer (Czech: Taxivrah), is a Czech serial killer who murdered three taxi drivers in Prague and the surrounding areas from January to April 2014. He would later be arrested, tried, convicted and sentenced to life imprisonment for these crimes.

== Early life ==
Little is known about Virgulák's life. Born in 1981 in Prague, he was a licensed plumber who developed an addiction to drugs sometime in 2003. According to his own claims, he started taking them because he had no idea what else to spend his money on, experimenting with substances such as meth and heroin. In order to feed his addiction, he would initially spend 6,000 CZK a day, but later switched to using buprenorphine and clonazepam, which cost him only 1,000.

At the time of the murders, Virgulák lived at his mother's house, had no girlfriend, was childless and unemployed since 2003. In order to make a living, he engaged in petty thefts and collecting items from trash cans and bins. He had a criminal record of about twenty theft-related offenses, most of which were related to shoplifting. In October 2003, while shoplifting from a newsagent, he threatened to kill the shop assistant after she attempted to stop him. In February 2014, with the help of his brother Petr, he assaulted a security guard while attempting to steal from a store.

== Murders ==
The first murder took place on 30 January 2014. On that day, Virgulák hailed a Honda CR-V taxi in central Prague driven by 42-year-old Petr Sedláček, a father of two. He requested that he be driven to the small village of Luka pod Medníkem. When they arrived there sometime around 8 PM, Virgulák pulled out a gun and fired five shots into the back of Sedláček's head, killing him. He then stole his wallet, phone and two tablets, and then drove the car to the centre of Prague. Sedláček's body was found two days later on Lužická Street, when a passer-by noticed that the car had been sitting in the same place for two days and that there was blood on the door. The municipal police ticketed the vehicle for violating parking regulations, with the officers apparently not noticing the body inside the car because of the tinted windows.

On 10 April, at around 11 PM, Virgulák hailed a Škoda Superb taxi on Štěpánská Street, driven by 38-year-old Milan Paris. He asked Milan to drive him to Uhříněves, on the outskirts of Prague, and when he did, Virgulák pulled out a gun and shot him twice in the head and neck. After killing his victim, he stole his wallet, mobile phone and his personal documents. Virgulák then carried the body out of the car and dumped it on a bicycle path, and then drove the car back to the centre of the capital. Along the way, he even picked up a passenger and drove them to their destination. After completing this, he parked the car on Salmovské Street at around 1:40 AM.

Just two hours after killing Paris, Virgulák hailed another taxi driven by 25-year-old Daniel Cicek. After instructing him to the drive to Uhříněves, and when they reached it around 2 AM, Virgulák shot him in the head at the intersection Ječná and Lipová Streets. Like the previous victims, he stole money, a phone and several other items. Virgulák then carried the body out of the car and dumped it about 90 metres away from where he had dumped Paris' body. He then drove the car, a beige Renault Mégane, and parked it on Lužická Street at approximately 2:40 AM.

In the aftermath of the murders, a motorcade of taxi drivers drove through Prague honouring the memory of their murdered colleagues by honking horns and flashing lights. At the same time, there was also speculation that the killings might be connected to the recent murder of a woman on a tram.

== Investigation ==
The police quickly connected the three killings, as the same trace of odour was found in all vehicles, with shell casings from a 6.35mm pistol being found at the crime scenes. However, the perpetrator's motive was not entirely clear, and it was unknown whether there was a single or multiple killers. After the two April murders, all taxi drivers operating in Prague were warned to only take customers who report to the dispatch center in advance. If the customer wanted a ride from Prague to a smaller village, the driver was instructed to drop them off in the center of the village, where there were more people. Some taxi drivers were also required to acquire guns, video cameras or panic buttons.

The case was the subject of great media attention. In July 2014, the police published an identikit of a person of interest who they believed might be the killer. A reward of 100,000 CZK was offered for any information that might lead to the killer's capture.

== Arrest ==
Shortly after the final murder, Virgulák was caught shoplifting. Officers noticed that he had one of the murdered taxi drivers' IDs, but at the time, he was still considered only as a possible witness and charged solely with theft. However, wiretaps were installed in his prison cell, and after listening in to his conversations with his brother, they realized that Virgulák was sharing details only the killer could have known. He immediately became the prime suspect, and was finally charged with the murders in May 2015. For unknown reasons, the police did not disclose this fact to the public until November of that year.

== Trial ==
Virgulák's trial began in November 2016, amid considerable media attention. In court, he proclaimed he was innocent and said that the police were framing him. Virgulák made a variety of statements, including that he had never entered the victims' cars (despite physical traces linking to them); he had not used a taxi since 2001; had never seen the murder victims; had never owned a firearm for more than a week and was not very good at driving.

In December 2016, he was convicted of all three murders on mostly circumstantial evidence and was sentenced to life imprisonment. The evidence included footprints that matched Virgulák's shoes, a pistol found to be in his possession, gunshot residue, the lack of a strong alibi and the wiretaps. Another significant piece of evidence was a stolen wallet that belonged to one of the victims. The prosecution also considered submitting in evidence Virgulák's diary, as he had recorded several dates and written suspicious things that they believed could be referencing the murders, but it was deemed too vague and ignored.

At sentencing, the presiding judge stated that the reason why he imposed a life sentence on Virgulák was because of the seriousness of the crimes and the low chance of him being rehabilitated. In his statement, the judge called him "unbalanced, internally less stable and dissociative...impulsive and prone to reckless behavior exacerbated by his alcohol and drug addictions, coupled with his aggressive speech." Immediately after hearing this, Virgulák made a statement in which he said that "[he] would have shot the dogs that found the scent trail." Following his conviction, he became the first life-sentenced prisoner in the country's history to be convicted solely on circumstantial evidence.

== Imprisonment ==
In June 2017, Virgulák's appeal was denied by the High Court in Prague, followed shortly afterwards by a similar denial by the Supreme Court. Upon hearing the outcome of his appeal issued by the High Court, he said that "Kajínek's era is over and [his] has begun." This referred to the case of Jiří Kajínek, a life-sentenced prisoner who had recently been pardoned by president Miloš Zeman. In March 2018, he filed a complaint to the Constitutional Court in an attempt to have his sentence commuted.

In December 2018, Virgulák's final appeal was denied by the Constitutional Court, finalizing his life sentence.

== In popular culture ==
- One episode of Případy 1. oddělení was inspired by the case.

== See also ==
- List of Czech serial killers
