= Michal Semanský =

Czech serial killer

- Born: Rychnov nad Kněžnou, Czechoslovakia
- Other name: Angel of Death
- Conviction: Murder x3
- Penalty: Life imprisonment

Details
- Victims: 3
- Span of crimes: 2009–2012
- Country: Czech Republic
- Date apprehended: January 2012

Michal Semanský, known as the Angel of Death (Czech: Anděl smrti), is a Czech serial killer who murdered three elderly people from 2009 to 2012 with the motive to robbery. He would later be tried, convicted and sentenced to life imprisonment.

== Murders ==
On 30 September 2009, Semanský rode from Dvůr Králové nad Labem to Sudkov on a bicycle, a trip of about 300 kilometers, to borrow some money from his 72-year-old uncle. While the uncle had given him money on previous occasions, this time he refused, as Semanský still had not paid him back for previous times he had borrowed money. Unwilling to leave without the money, Semanský strangled his uncle to death and then stole 90,000 CZK with which he wanted to pay off his and his girlfriend's rent and to take care of his adopted daughter. Before leaving the house, he set the house on fire. Because of the fire, initial thoughts was that the old man died in an accident. Semanský then took a taxi home, which cost him around 2,000 CZK.

On 20 February 2011, Semanský learned that a 67-year-old relative of his, who was visiting from Prague, intended to report him for stealing alcohol and committing other crimes. He then traveled to the man's house in Lípa nad Orlicí, strangled him and initially hid the body by placing it on the bed, but then changed his mind and threw it down a well the following day.

On 18 January 2012, Semanský decided to rob a house in Týniště nad Orlicí, which he previously broke into on 21 December 2011, when he had stolen less than 10,000 CZK. This time, he came across the 74-year-old homeowner, who became frightened and handed him less than 8,000 CZK. Instead of leaving her alone, Semanský locked her up in a closet, where the woman suffocated to death after a few hours.

== Arrest, investigation and trial ==
A week after committing the murder, Semanský was arrested. He willingly cooperated with police and confessed to all the murders, but claimed that he did not intend to kill any of them.

In November 2012, he was found guilty on all counts and sentenced to life imprisonment by the Regional Court in Hradec Králové. Semanský appealed against the verdict, but in January 2013, the High Court in Prague upheld the sentence. He was given the nickname Angel of Death (Czech: Anděl smrti) by Czech media.

== See also ==
- List of Czech serial killers
