= Otto Špaček =

Otto Špaček (7 March 1918 – 24 September 2007) was a Czech World War II fighter pilot of the Czechoslovak Air Force. He fought against Nazi Germany in Great Britain and France.

== Life ==
Špaček was born in Brzice in Bohemia. His parents were teachers. He served an apprenticeship as an electrician. After flying school, he joined the Czechoslovak Air Force in the 1930s.

He fled to Poland after the Nazi invasion in June 1939, and then escaped to France, where he served with French Air Force in 1940. After the fall of France, he moved to Britain and joined the Royal Air Force as a fighter pilot in June 1940. Špaček initially joined No. 312 Squadron RAF, but moved to No. 313 Squadron RAF in 1941, flying Spitfires with many other exiled Czech and Slovak pilots.

Špaček was injured in 1940 and survived three air crashes during World War II. Špaček took part in close air support for the D-Day invasion of Normandy in 1944. He was credited with shooting down 3 German aircraft during the war, and won 5 Czechoslovak War Crosses, the Czechoslovak Bravery Medal and the French Croix de Guerre.

Špaček returned to Czechoslovakia after the end of World War II, but was expelled from the army when the Communists took power in Czechoslovakia in 1948. He once again left Czechoslovakia in 1949 and took his family into exile in Canada, where he operated a petrol station.

Špaček remained in exile until the fall of the Communist government of Czechoslovakia in 1989. He returned to the Czech Republic from Canada in 1993, and was promoted to the rank of brigadier general. He resided in the Czech Republic for the rest of his life, where he remarried, his first wife having died in Canada.

Otto Špaček died at the age of 89. His funeral took place in Prague.

== Honours and awards ==
- Czechoslovak War Cross (five times)
- Czechoslovak Medal for Bravery
- Czechoslovak Medal for Merit, Grade I
- Croix de Guerre with two palms (France)
- 1939-1945 Star, Atlantic Clasp (United Kingdom)
- Air Crew Europe Star (United Kingdom)
- Defence Medal (United Kingdom)
- War Medal 1939–1945 (United Kingdom)
