= Chuchelna =

- Municipality
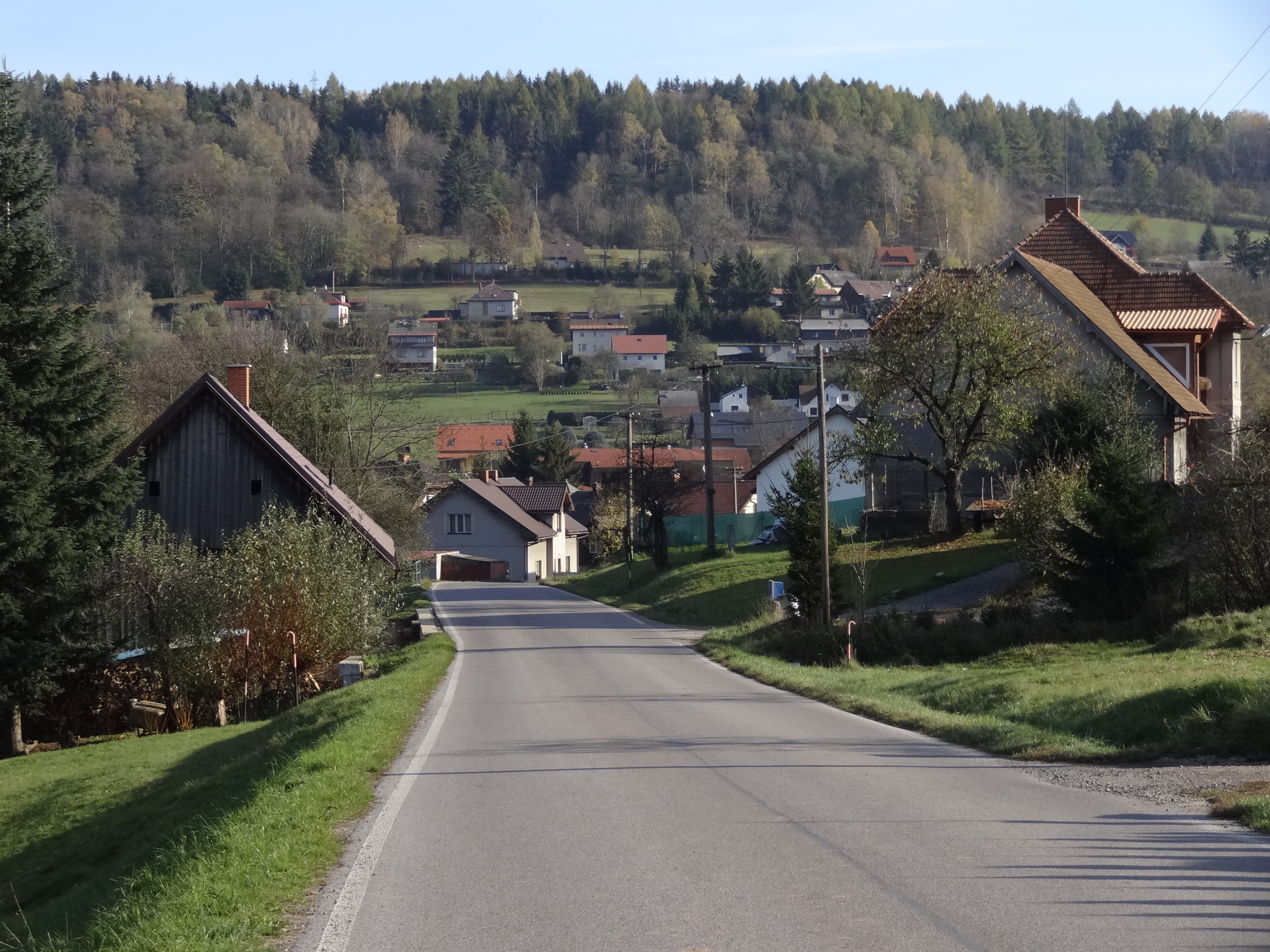
- View from the west

- Location in the Czech Republic
- Coordinates: 50°36′8″N 15°18′2″E
- Country: Czech Republic
- Region: Liberec
- District: Semily
- First mentioned: 1410

Area
  - Total: 10.78 km^{2} (4.16 sq mi)
- Elevation: 385 m (1,263 ft)

Population (2026-01-01)
  - Total: 976
  - Density: 90.5/km^{2} (234/sq mi)
- Time zone: UTC+1 (CET)
  - Summer (DST): UTC+2 (CEST)
- Postal code: 513 01
- Website: www.chuchelna.cz

Chuchelna is a municipality and village in Semily District in the Liberec Region of the Czech Republic. It has about 1,000 inhabitants.

== Administrative division ==
Chuchelna consists of three municipal parts (in brackets population according to the 2021 census):

- Chuchelna (825)
- Komárov (45)
- Lhota (86)

== Etymology ==
The name Chuchelna was derived from the Czech adjective chuchelný. The word chuchel denoted a small piece of oakum.

== Geography ==
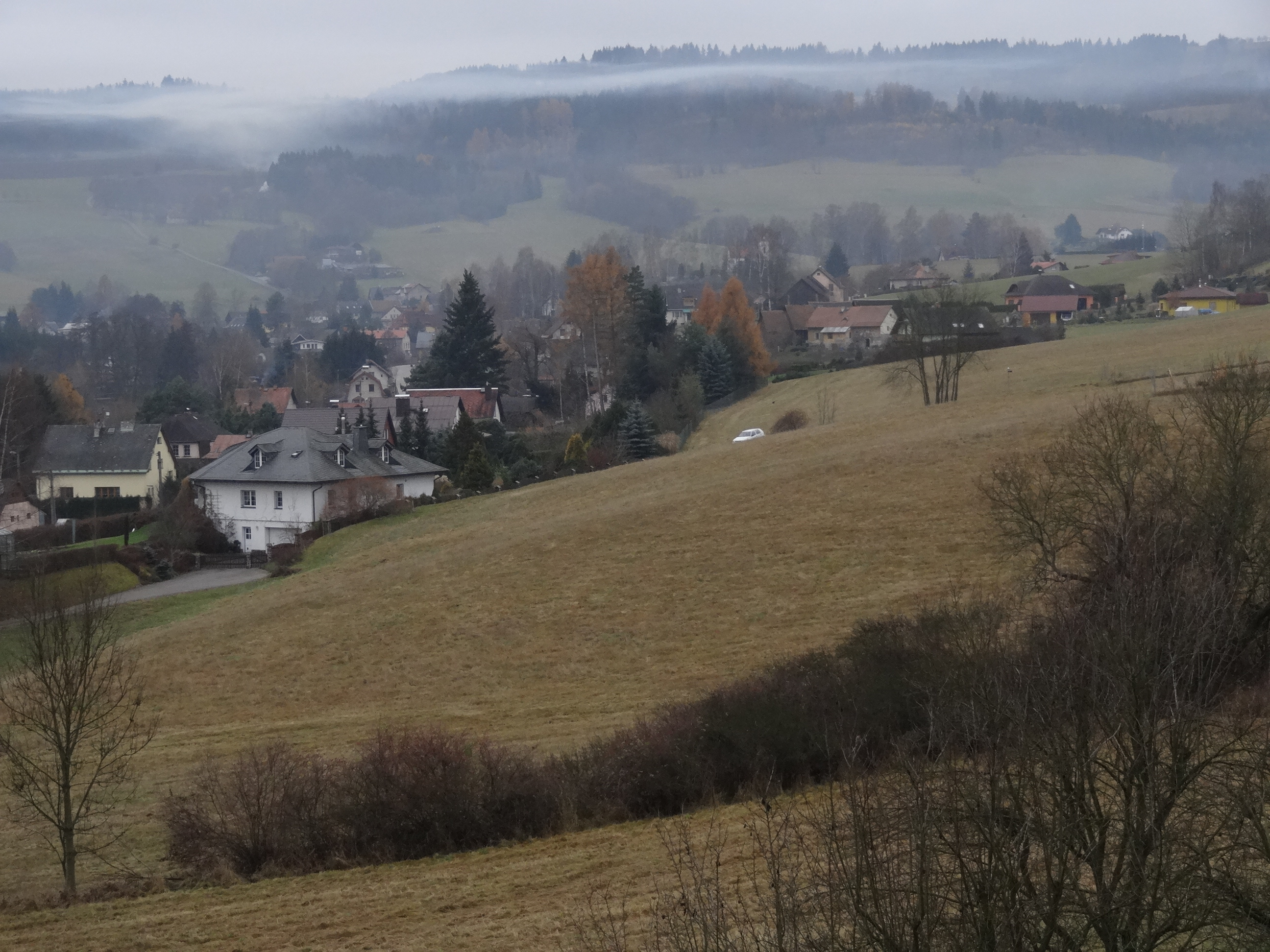
View from the north

Chuchelna is located west of Semily, directly bordering with it, and about 23 kilometres (14 mi) southeast of Liberec. It lies on the border between the Giant Mountains Foothills and Ještěd–Kozákov Ridge. The highest point is the mountain Kozákov at 744 m (2,441 ft) above sea level, located in the western part of the municipal territory. The mountain is known for the finds of olivines and gemstones. The Jizera River briefly forms the northern municipal border. In the area of Kozákov, Chuchelna marginally extends into the Bohemian Paradise Protected Landscape Area.

== History ==
The first written mention of Chuchelna is from 1410. It belonged to the Rotštejn and Hrubá Skála estates, and from the 17th century to the Semily estate.

== Demographics ==
Historical population

Year	Pop.	±%
1869	1,722	—
1880	1,890	+9.8%
1890	2,063	+9.2%
1900	1,868	−9.5%
1910	2,024	+8.4%

Year	Pop.	±%
1921	1,784	−11.9%
1930	1,734	−2.8%
1950	1,143	−34.1%
1961	1,169	+2.3%
1970	1,026	−12.2%

Year	Pop.	±%
1980	958	−6.6%
1991	882	−7.9%
2001	901	+2.2%
2011	923	+2.4%
2021	956	+3.6%

Source: Censuses

== Transport ==
There are no railways or major roads passing through the municipality.

== Sport ==
There is a small ski resort on the eastern slopes of Kozákov. It has three ski slopes and a 500 m-long (1,600 ft) lift. The peak of Kozákov is known as a starting point for paragliding.

== Sights ==
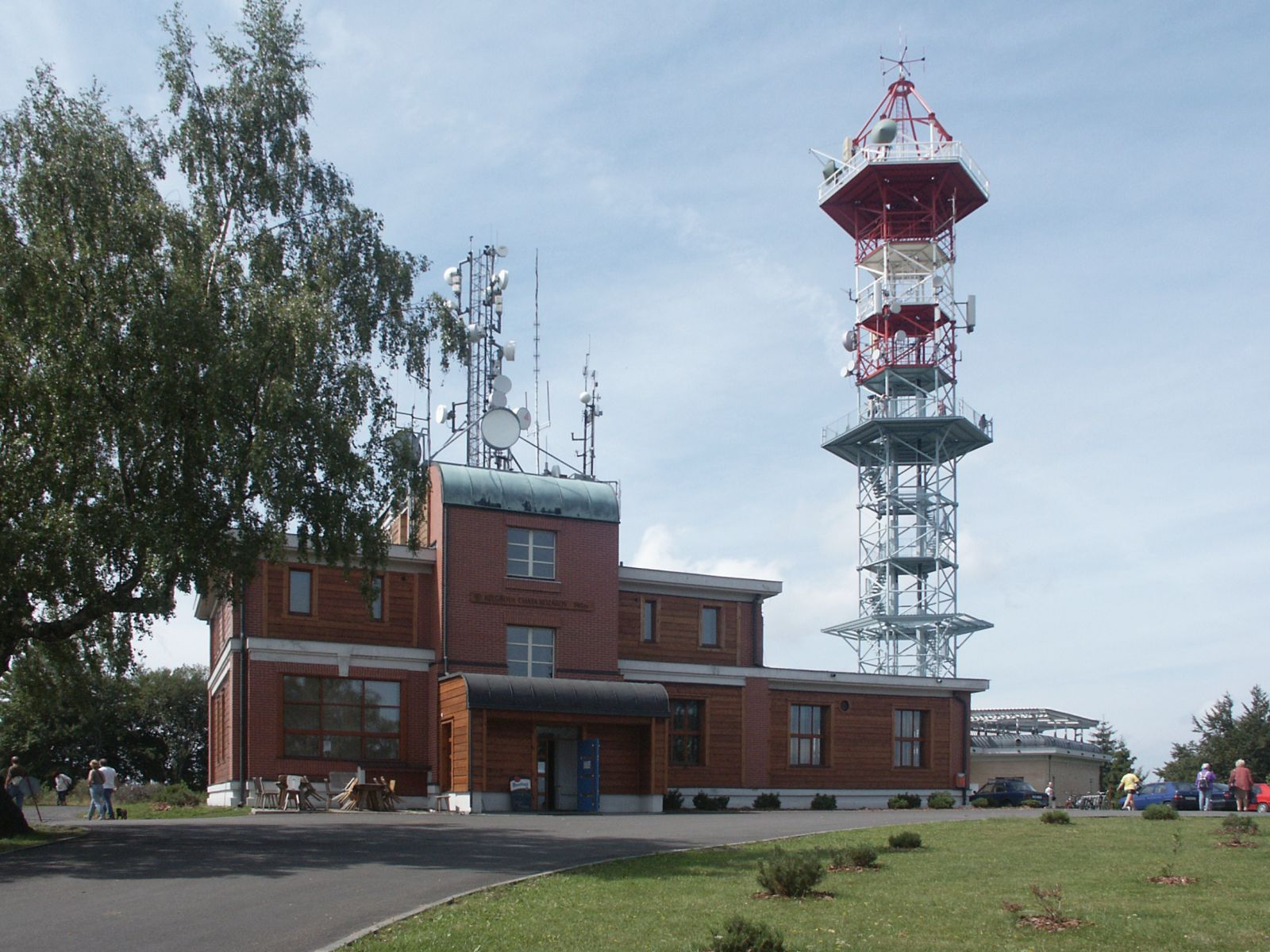
Kozákov observation tower and Rieger's hut

The only protected cultural monuments in the municipality are a sculptural group of Calvary from 1734 in the centre of Chuchelna and a sandstone cross from 1854 in Komárov.

On the top of Kozákov is a steel observation tower and the Rieger's hut, built in 1928 and named in honour of František Ladislav Rieger.
