= Staré Sedlo (Sokolov District) =

- Municipality
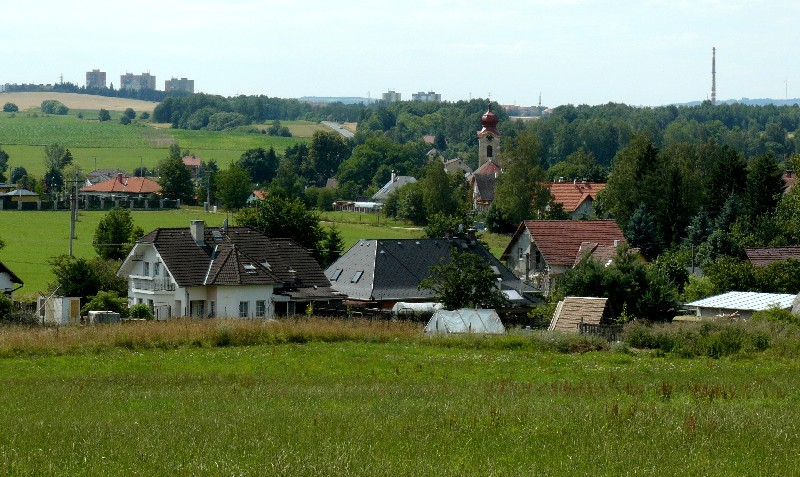
- Staré Sedlo seen from the east

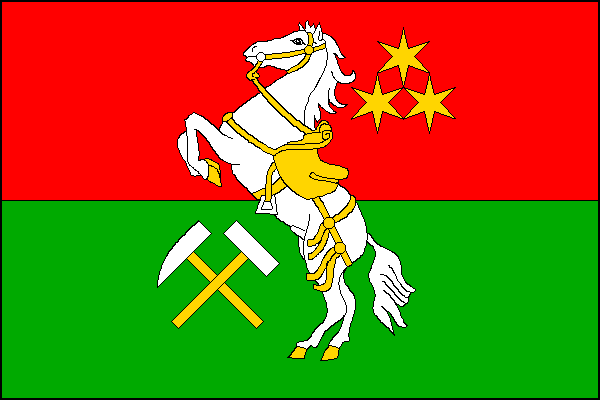
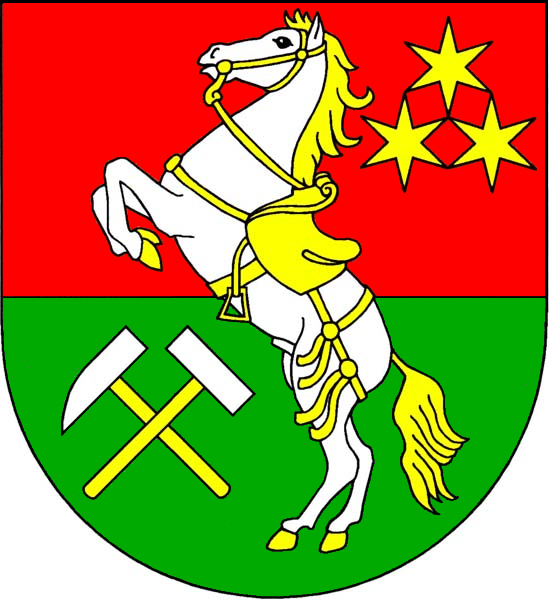
- Flag Coat of arms

- Location in the Czech Republic
- Coordinates: 50°10′55″N 12°43′12″E
- Country: Czech Republic
- Region: Karlovy Vary
- District: Sokolov
- First mentioned: 1250

Area
  - Total: 6.50 km^{2} (2.51 sq mi)
- Elevation: 418 m (1,371 ft)

Population (2026-01-01)
  - Total: 785
  - Density: 121/km^{2} (313/sq mi)
- Time zone: UTC+1 (CET)
  - Summer (DST): UTC+2 (CEST)
- Postal code: 356 01
- Website: www.staresedlo.cz

Staré Sedlo (German: Altsattl) is a municipality and village in Sokolov District in the Karlovy Vary Region of the Czech Republic. It has about 800 inhabitants.

== Demographics ==
Historical population
| Year | Pop. | ±% |
|---|---|---|
| 1869 | 1,141 | — |
| 1880 | 1,294 | +13.4% |
| 1890 | 1,414 | +9.3% |
| 1900 | 1,574 | +11.3% |
| 1910 | 1,800 | +14.4% |
| 1921 | 1,829 | +1.6% |
| 1930 | 1,909 | +4.4% |
| 1950 | 984 | −48.5% |
| 1961 | 954 | −3.0% |
| 1970 | 790 | −17.2% |
| 1980 | 672 | −14.9% |
| 1991 | 628 | −6.5% |
| 2001 | 721 | +14.8% |
| 2011 | 778 | +7.9% |
| 2021 | 779 | +0.1% |
Source: Censuses
