= Komárov (Tábor District) =

- Municipality
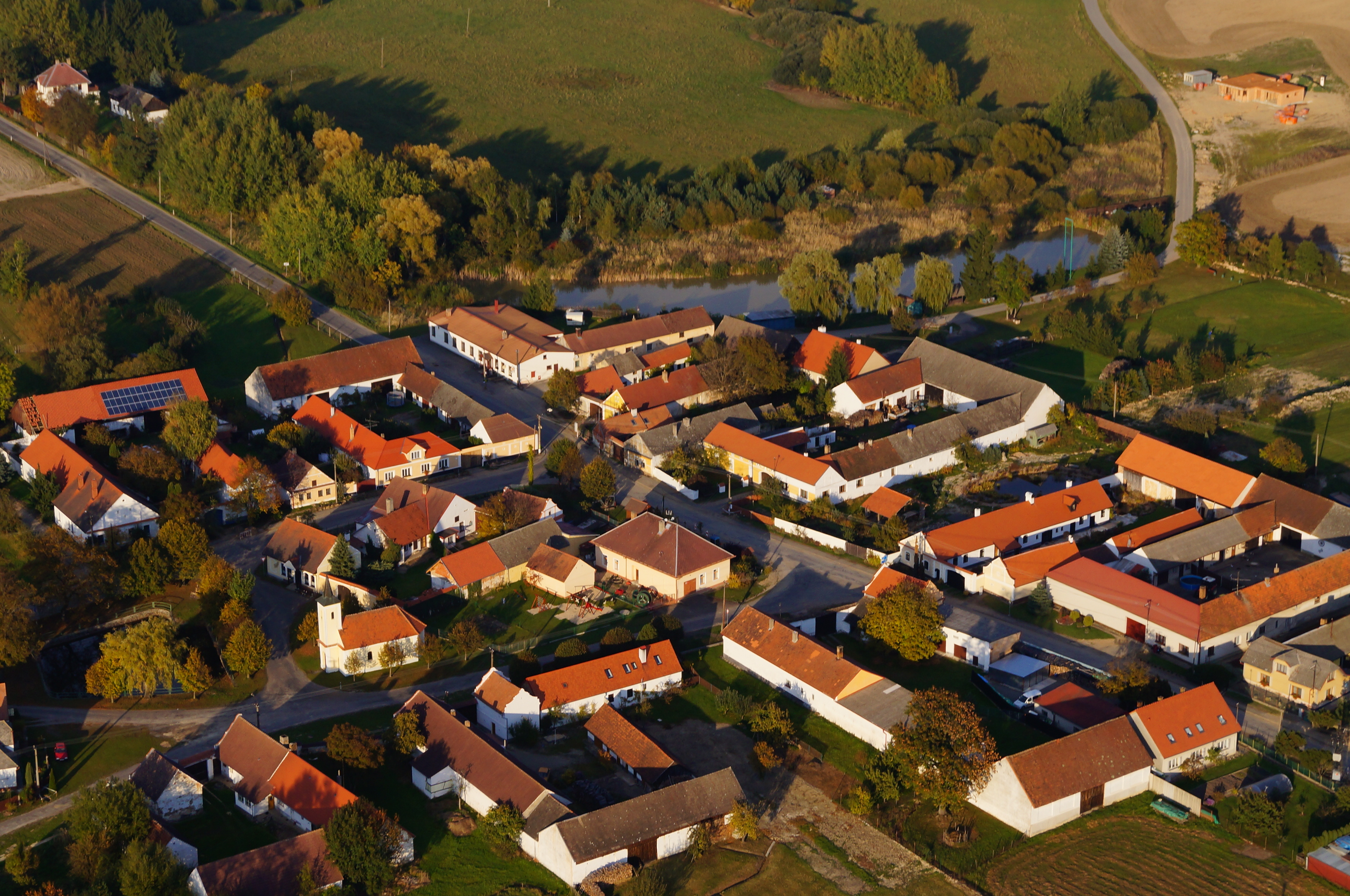
- Aerial view of the centre of Komárov

- Location in the Czech Republic
- Coordinates: 49°15′0″N 14°35′39″E
- Country: Czech Republic
- Region: South Bohemian
- District: Tábor
- First mentioned: 1492

Area
  - Total: 8.61 km^{2} (3.32 sq mi)
- Elevation: 429 m (1,407 ft)

Population (2026-01-01)
  - Total: 129
  - Density: 15.0/km^{2} (38.8/sq mi)
- Time zone: UTC+1 (CET)
  - Summer (DST): UTC+2 (CEST)
- Postal code: 392 01
- Website: www.obeckomarov.cz

Komárov is a municipality and village in Tábor District in the South Bohemian Region of the Czech Republic. It has about 100 inhabitants.

Komárov lies approximately 19 kilometres (12 mi) south of Tábor, 33 km (21 mi) north of České Budějovice, and 94 km (58 mi) south of Prague.

== Demographics ==
Historical population
Year	Pop.	±%
1869	275	—
1880	275	+0.0%
1890	291	+5.8%
1900	261	−10.3%
1910	241	−7.7%
1921	242	+0.4%
1930	262	+8.3%
1950	177	−32.4%
1961	194	+9.6%
1970	192	−1.0%
1980	154	−19.8%
1991	139	−9.7%
2001	127	−8.6%
2011	117	−7.9%
2021	127	+8.5%
Source: Censuses
