= Brzice =

- Municipality
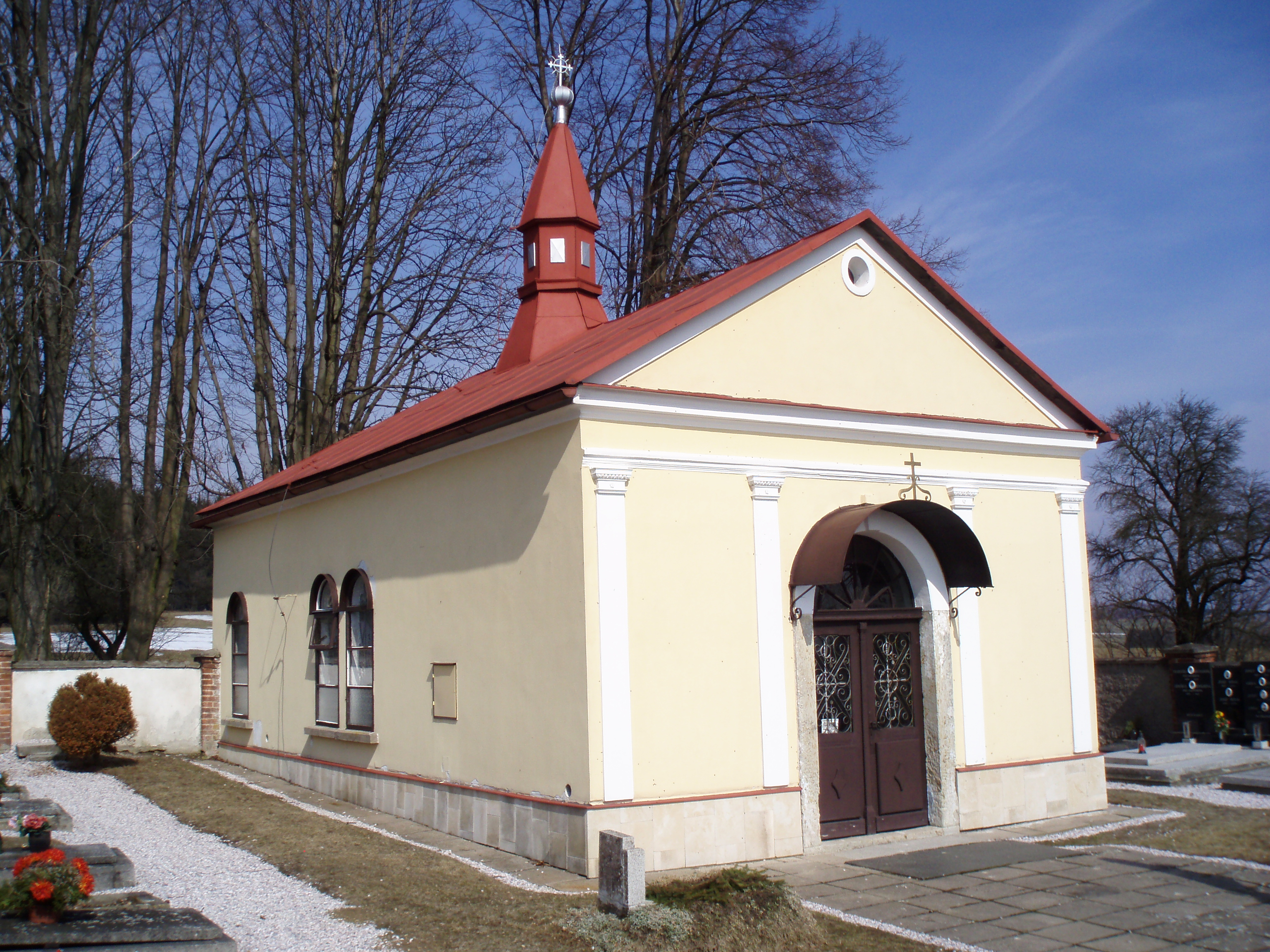
- Chapel of the Virgin Mary

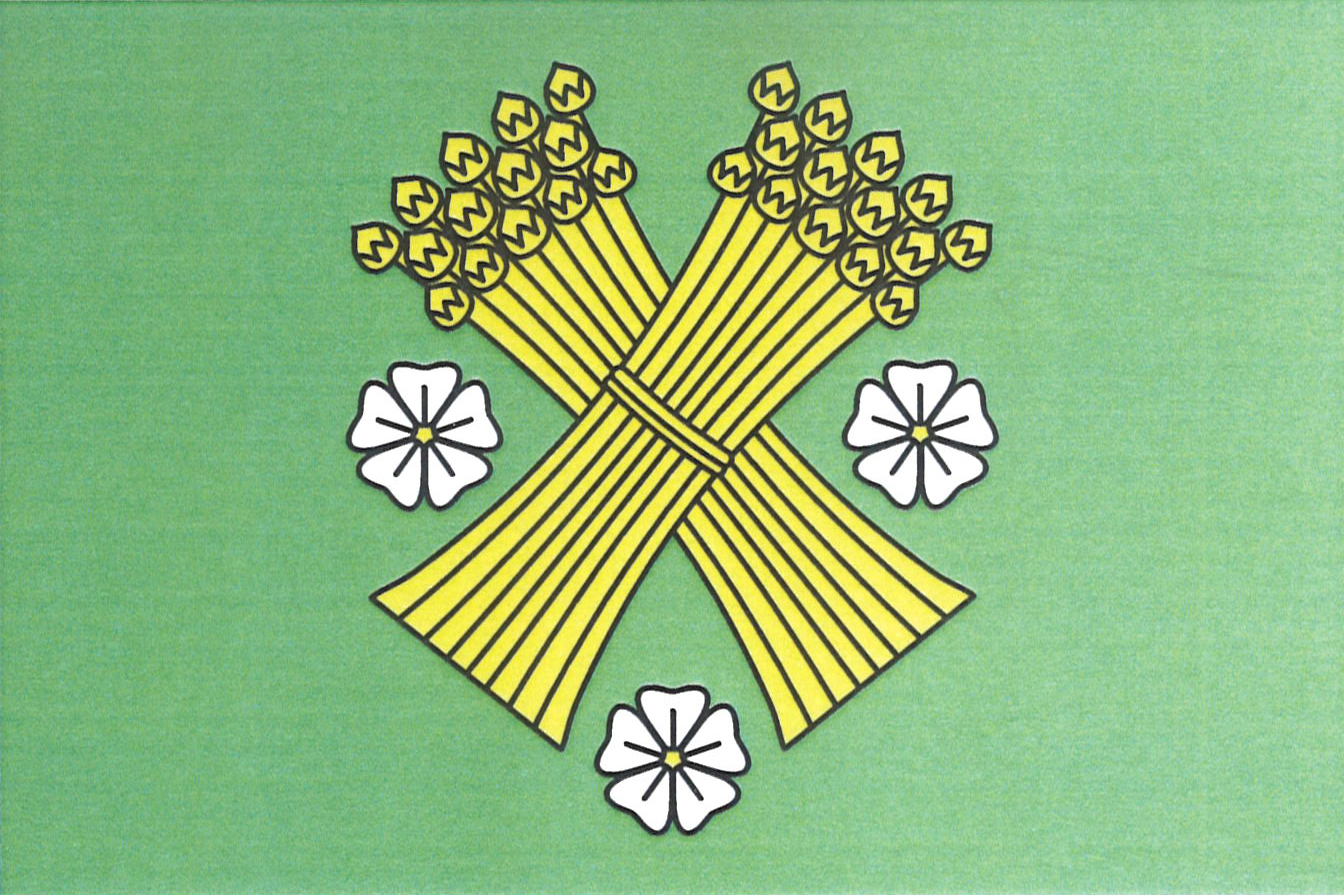
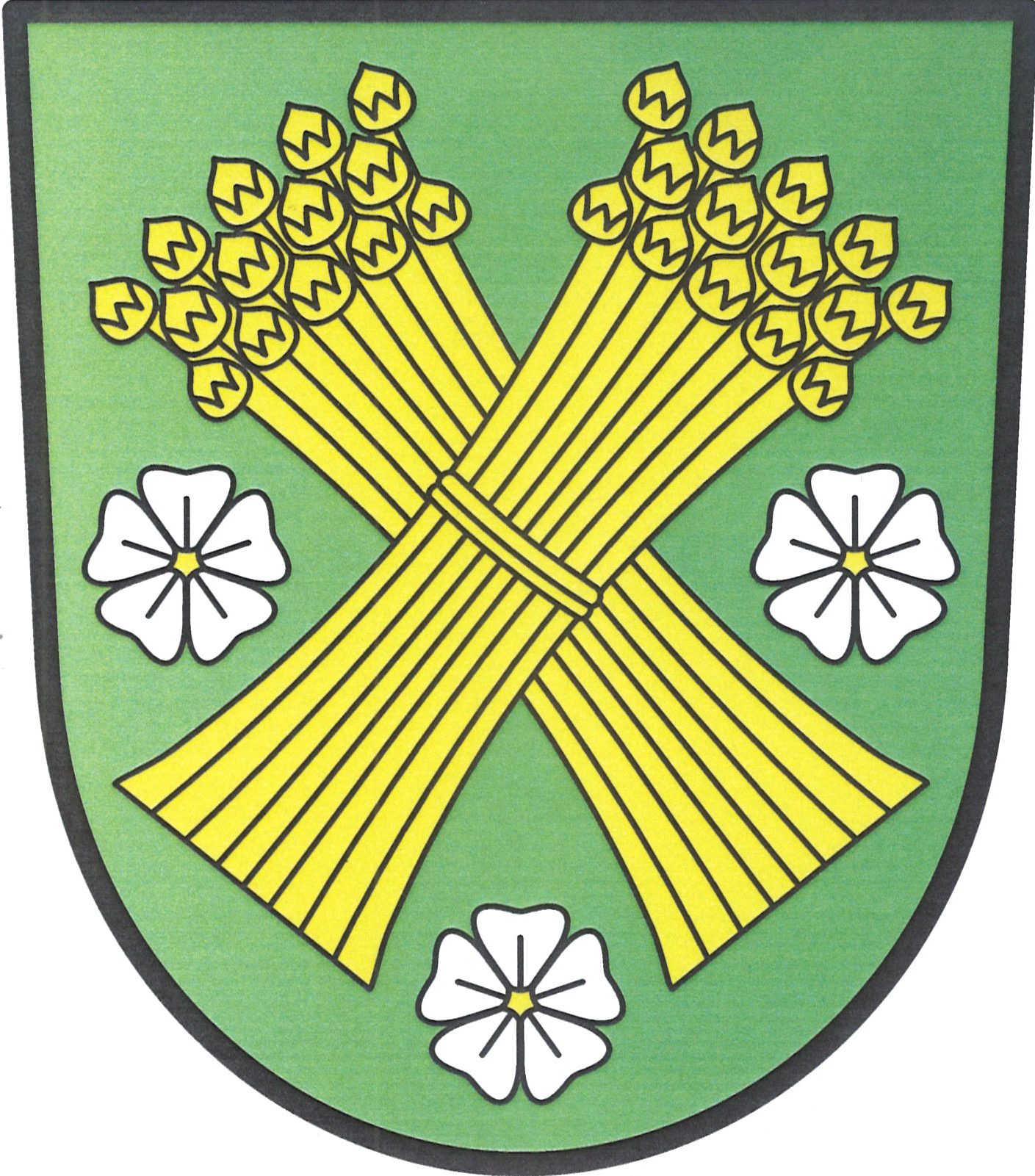
- Flag Coat of arms

- Location in the Czech Republic
- Coordinates: 50°26′40″N 15°57′30″E
- Country: Czech Republic
- Region: Hradec Králové
- District: Náchod
- First mentioned: 1422

Area
  - Total: 10.51 km^{2} (4.06 sq mi)
- Elevation: 429 m (1,407 ft)

Population (2026-01-01)
  - Total: 250
  - Density: 24/km^{2} (62/sq mi)
- Time zone: UTC+1 (CET)
  - Summer (DST): UTC+2 (CEST)
- Postal code: 552 05
- Website: www.brzice.cz

Brzice (German: Brösel) is a municipality and village in Náchod District in the Hradec Králové Region of the Czech Republic. It has about 300 inhabitants.

== Administrative division ==
Brzice consists of five municipal parts (in brackets population according to the 2021 census):

- Brzice (167)
- Běluň (10)
- Komárov (7)
- Proruby (63)
- Žďár (4)

== Demographics ==
Historical population
Year	Pop.	±%
1869	1,281	—
1880	1,216	−5.1%
1890	1,116	−8.2%
1900	965	−13.5%
1910	850	−11.9%
1921	753	−11.4%
1930	698	−7.3%
1950	390	−44.1%
1961	345	−11.5%
1970	313	−9.3%
1980	278	−11.2%
1991	207	−25.5%
2001	201	−2.9%
2011	210	+4.5%
2021	251	+19.5%
Source: Censuses

== Notable people ==
- Otto Špaček (1918–2007), World War II fighter pilot
