= Dolní Roveň =

- Municipality
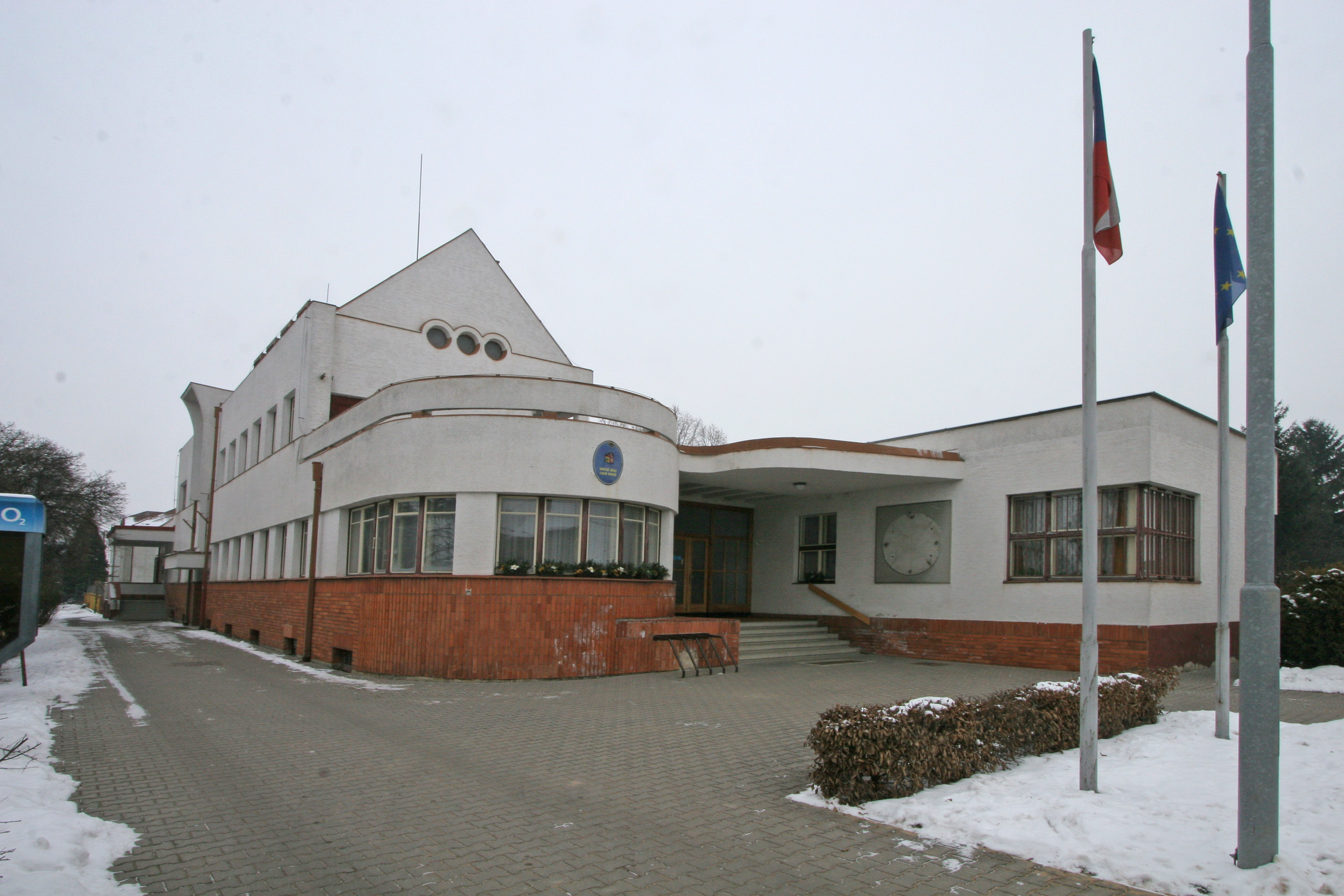
- Municipal office

- Flag Coat of arms

- Location in the Czech Republic
- Coordinates: 50°1′46″N 15°58′4″E
- Country: Czech Republic
- Region: Pardubice
- District: Pardubice
- First mentioned: 1336

Area
  - Total: 29.03 km^{2} (11.21 sq mi)
- Elevation: 229 m (751 ft)

Population (2026-01-01)
  - Total: 2,148
  - Density: 73.99/km^{2} (191.6/sq mi)
- Time zone: UTC+1 (CET)
  - Summer (DST): UTC+2 (CEST)
- Postal codes: 530 02, 533 71
- Website: www.dolniroven.cz

Dolní Roveň is a municipality and village in Pardubice District in the Pardubice Region of the Czech Republic. It has about 2,100 inhabitants.

== Administrative division ==
Dolní Roveň consists of four municipal parts (in brackets population according to the 2021 census):

- Dolní Roveň (879)
- Horní Roveň (610)
- Komárov (214)
- Litětiny (290)

== Etymology ==
The initial German name of Roveň was Walthersdorf ("Walthers's village"), but it was soon replaced by the Czech name Rovná, which was then distorted to Roveň. This name is derived from the Czech word rovina ('flatland', 'plain'). In the 19th century, two villages began to be distinguished: Dolní Roveň ('lower Roveň') and Horní Roveň ('upper Roveň').

== Geography ==
Dolní Roveň is located about 13 kilometres (8 mi) east of Pardubice. It lies in the East Elbe Table, on the edge of the Polabí region. The Lodrantka Stream flows through the municipality. The built-up area is situated along the stream.

== History ==
The first written mention of Roveň is from 1336. The village was probably founded in the second half of the 13th century. The most important owners of the village was the Pernštejn family. During their rule in 1516–1560, the village experienced its greatest development.

== Demographics ==
Historical population

Year	Pop.	±%
1869	2,500	—
1880	2,667	+6.7%
1890	2,694	+1.0%
1900	2,697	+0.1%
1910	2,853	+5.8%

Year	Pop.	±%
1921	2,703	−5.3%
1930	2,851	+5.5%
1950	2,250	−21.1%
1961	2,405	+6.9%
1970	2,094	−12.9%

Year	Pop.	±%
1980	1,978	−5.5%
1991	1,909	−3.5%
2001	1,858	−2.7%
2011	1,941	+4.5%
2021	1,993	+2.7%

Source: Censuses

== Transport ==
The D35 motorway runs through the municipality.

Dolní Roveň is located on a short railway of local importance heading from Holice to Moravany.

== Sights ==
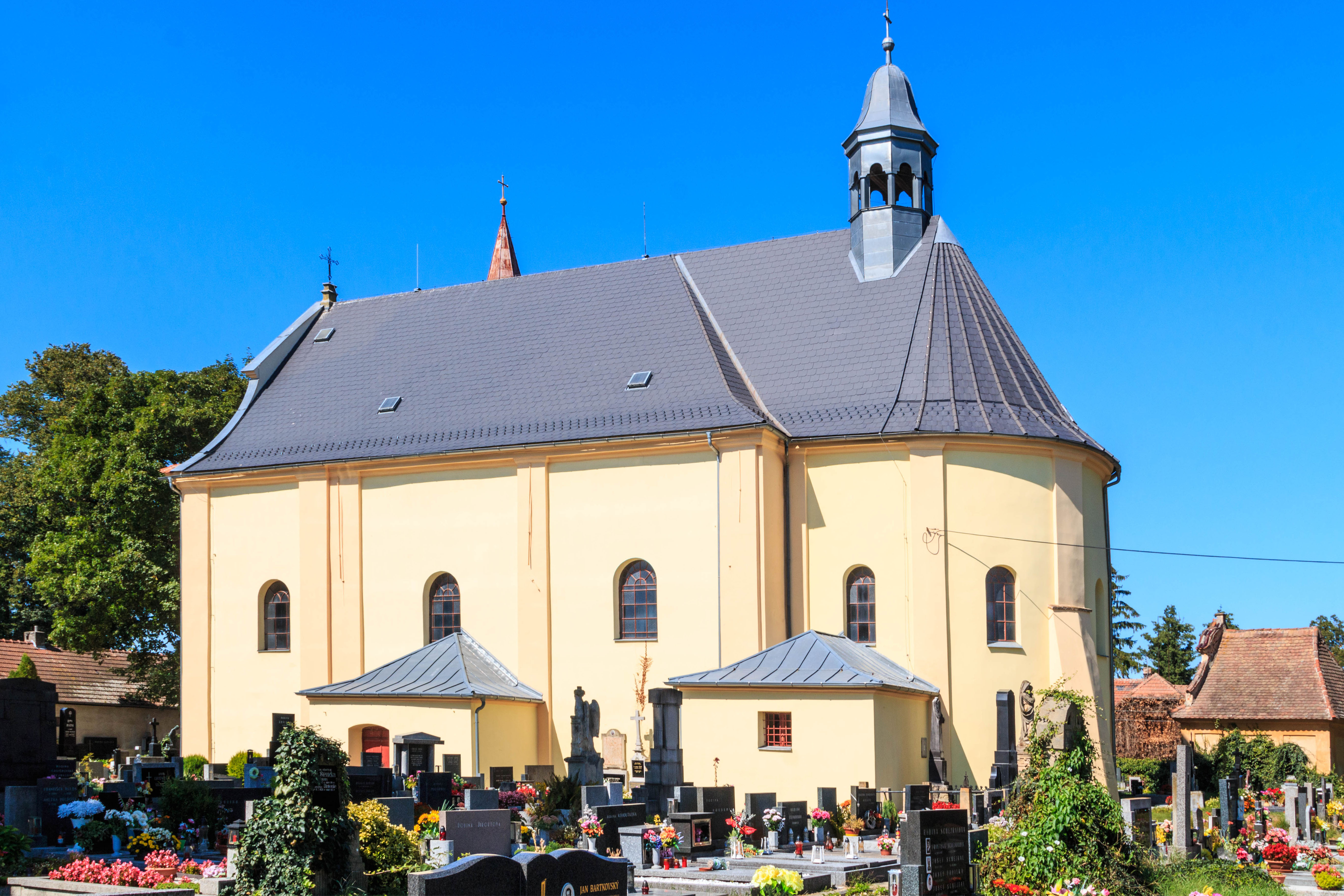
Church of Saint Catherine

The main landmark is the Church of Saint Catherine, located in Horní Roveň. It was built in the Baroque style in 1679–1699 on the site of an older wooden church.

== Notable people ==
- František Udržal (1866–1938), politician
- František Kovaříček (1924–2003), composer
