= Branžež =

- Municipality
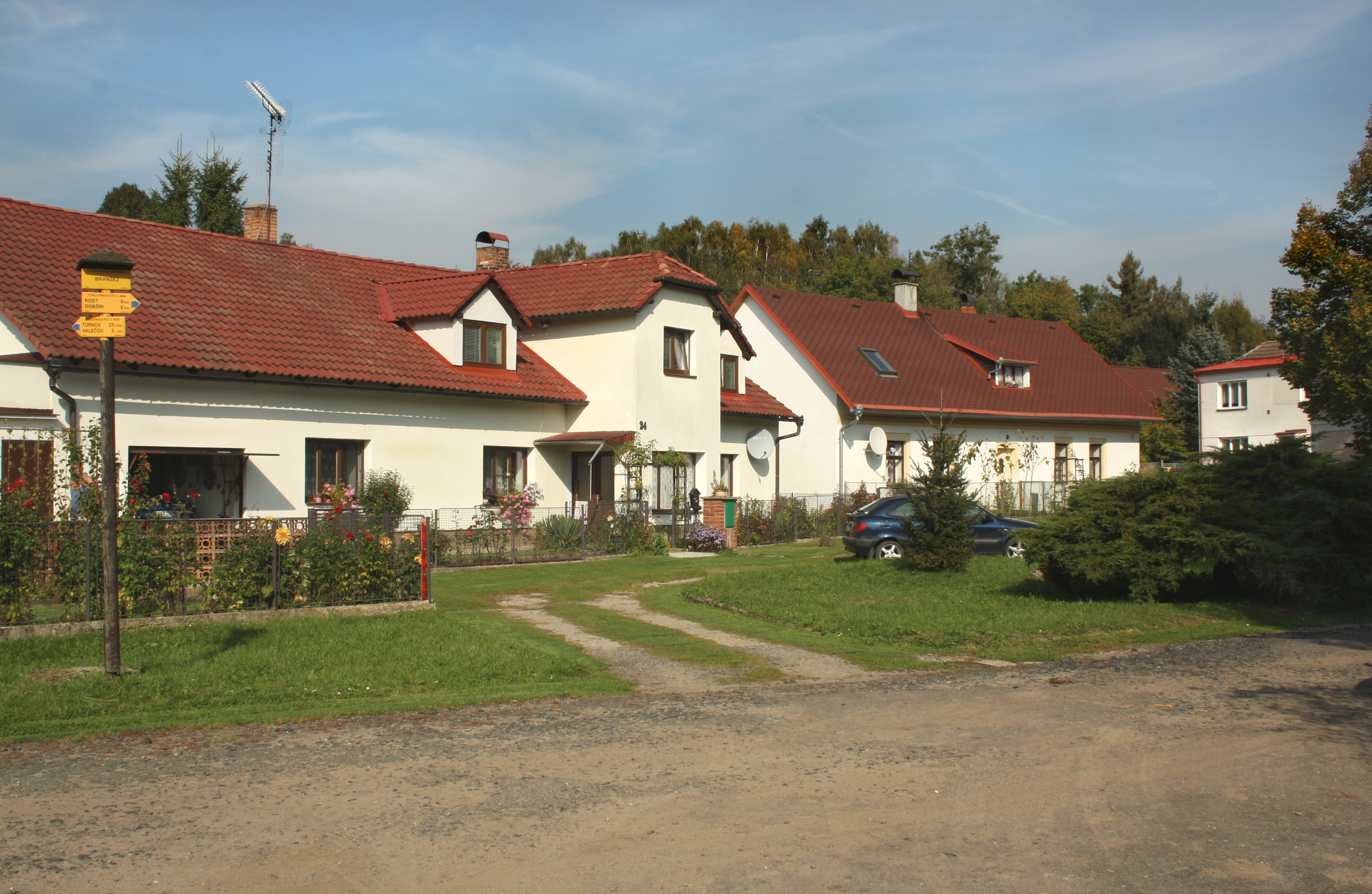
- Centre of Branžež

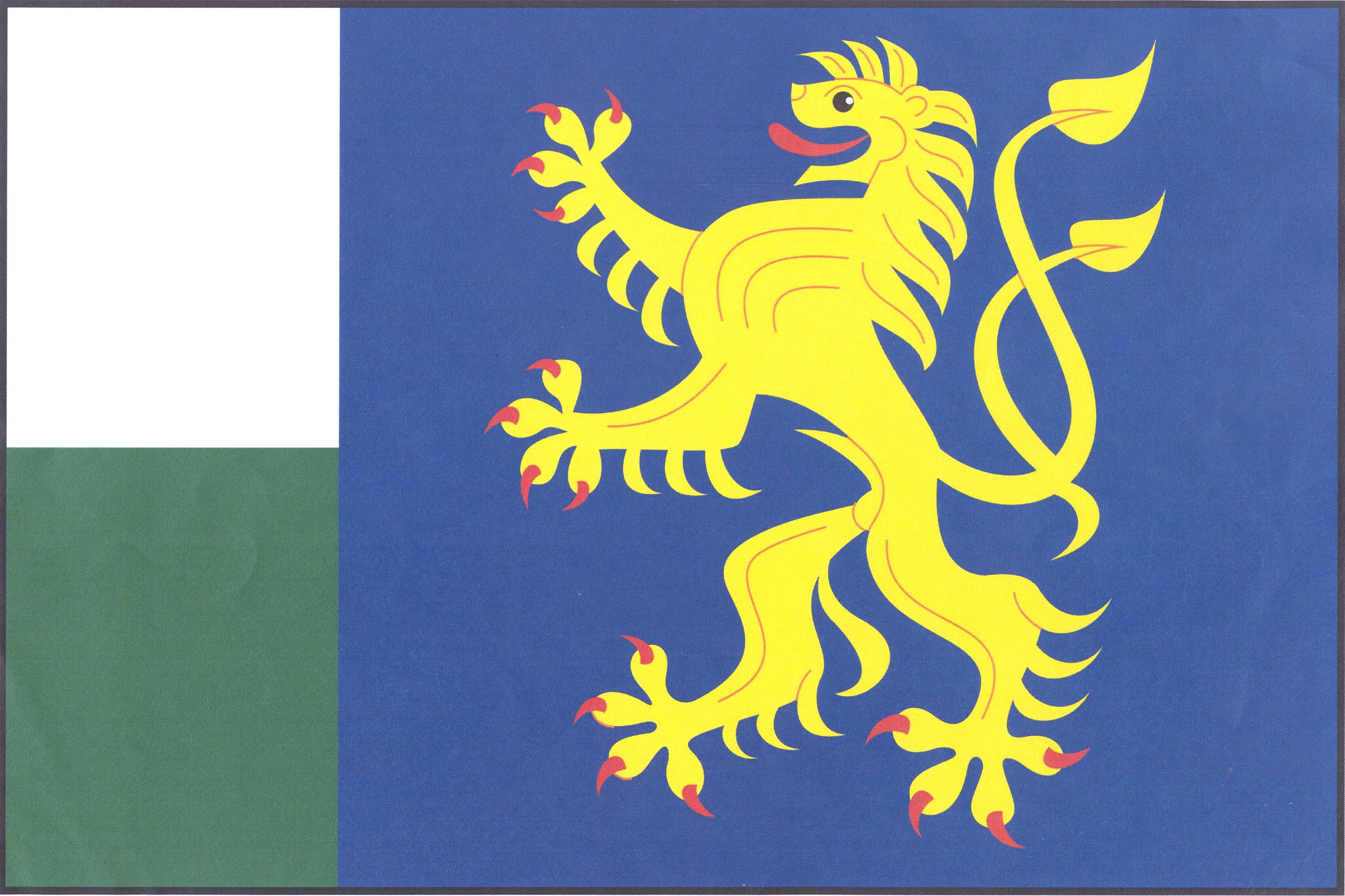
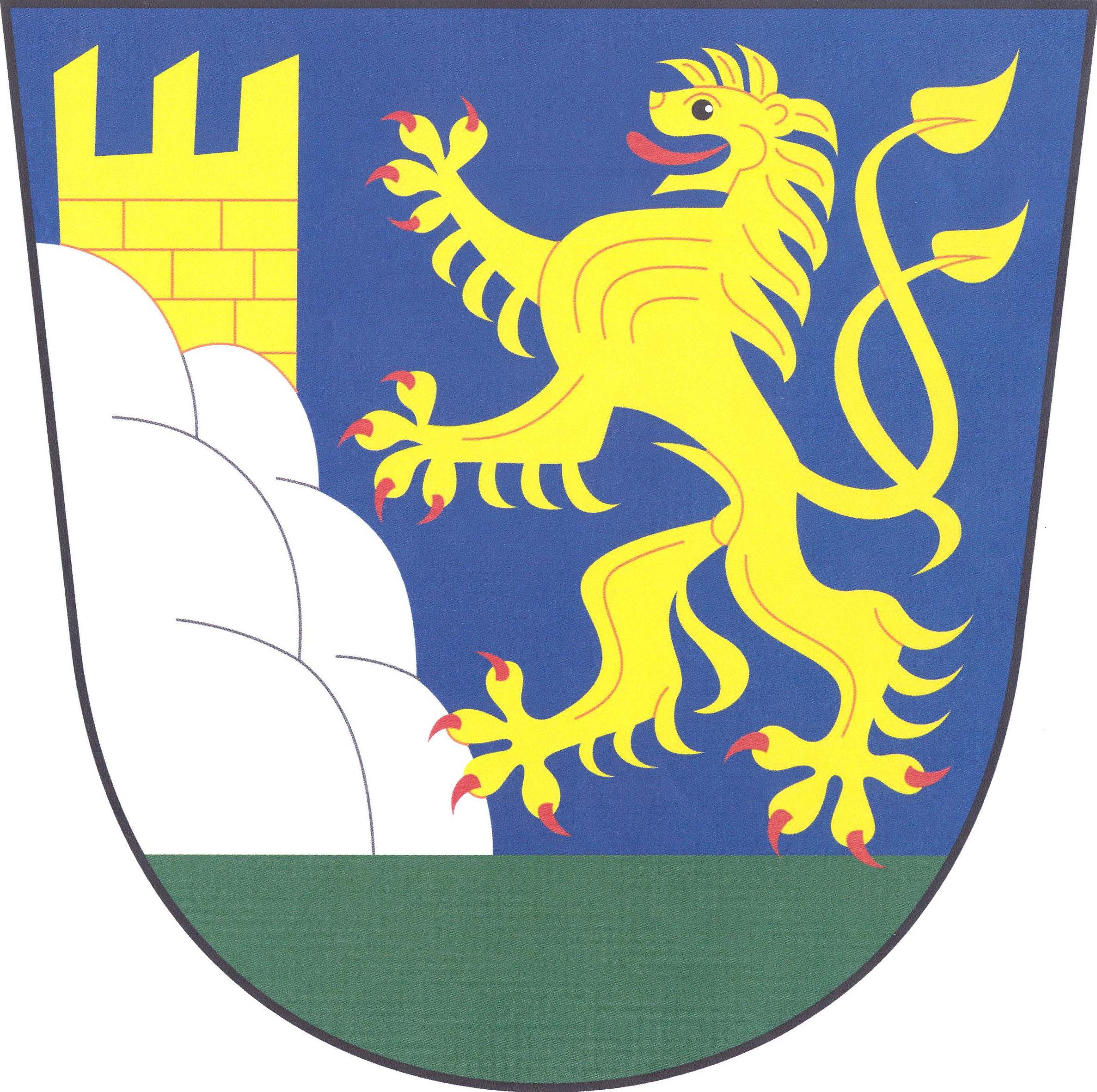
- Flag Coat of arms

- Location in the Czech Republic
- Coordinates: 50°30′28″N 15°3′29″E
- Country: Czech Republic
- Region: Central Bohemian
- District: Mladá Boleslav
- First mentioned: 1388

Area
  - Total: 6.70 km^{2} (2.59 sq mi)
- Elevation: 263 m (863 ft)

Population (2026-01-01)
  - Total: 272
  - Density: 40.6/km^{2} (105/sq mi)
- Time zone: UTC+1 (CET)
  - Summer (DST): UTC+2 (CEST)
- Postal code: 294 02
- Website: www.branzez.cz

Branžež is a municipality and village in Mladá Boleslav District in the Central Bohemian Region of the Czech Republic. It has about 300 inhabitants.

== Administrative division ==
Branžež consists of three municipal parts (in brackets population according to the 2021 census):

- Branžež (94)
- Nová Ves (144)
- Zakopaná (17)

== Demographics ==
Historical population
| Year | Pop. | ±% |
|---|---|---|
| 1869 | 507 | — |
| 1880 | 460 | −9.3% |
| 1890 | 463 | +0.7% |
| 1900 | 453 | −2.2% |
| 1910 | 436 | −3.8% |
| 1921 | 415 | −4.8% |
| 1930 | 445 | +7.2% |
| 1950 | 296 | −33.5% |
| 1961 | 344 | +16.2% |
| 1970 | 287 | −16.6% |
| 1980 | 254 | −11.5% |
| 1991 | 192 | −24.4% |
| 2001 | 188 | −2.1% |
| 2011 | 213 | +13.3% |
| 2021 | 255 | +19.7% |
Source: Censuses
