= Jaroslav Stodola and Dana Stodolová =

Czech-Slovak serial killers

Jaroslav Stodola
- Born: 8 May 1966 (age 60); Czechoslovakia
- Conviction: Murder
- Penalty: Life imprisonment

Details
- Victims: 7
- Span of crimes: 2001–2002
- Country: Czech Republic
- Date apprehended: 3 February 2003

Dana Stodolová
- Born: Dana Bábiková; 19 July 1970 (age 56); Czechoslovakia
- Conviction: Murder
- Penalty: Life imprisonment

Details
- Victims: 7
- Span of crimes: 2001–2002
- Country: Czech Republic
- Date apprehended: 3 February 2003

Jaroslav Stodola (born 8 May 1966) and Dana Stodolová (née Bábiková; born 19 July 1970) are a pair of Czech-Slovak serial killers who robbed and murdered 8 retirees between 2001 and 2002. In total, they were convicted of committing 17 serious crimes and both sentenced to life imprisonment.

== Lives before the murders ==
Dana Bábiková was born in Slovakia, where she married at the age of 15. A year later, a daughter was born. Due to marital issues, she soon divorced and moved to the Czech Republic, where she married a second time. She and her second husband travelled to Canada, where she worked as a bar dancer. In 1997, she was raped by a fellow employee and suffered from psychological trauma and then began to heavily abuse drugs. Due to this, her second marriage also ended in divorce. She then moved to her mother's house in Slavošov in the Kutná Hora District, in house number 31, where she married the four times court-sentenced Jaroslav Stodola, whom she met in 1998. He came from a troubled family, and in his youth, he ran away from his home and soon became self-sufficient. He was known as a quiet man, who only behaved aggressively when drunk. The pair were unable to find a stable job and quickly got into financial trouble.

== Crimes ==
On 30 September 2001, the disguised spouses went to the house of 77-year-old Alois Miškovský from Chabeřice, who was known for lending money. They threatened him with a knife and forced him to give them 160,000 CZK. The couple then tied him up and left him in the house, where he was discovered in a very bad condition two days later. Miškovský died less than a year later.

On 16 November 2001, the Stodolas decided to rob their 75-year-old neighbour Jaroslav Šanda from Slavošov, who was staying with Dana's mother. While Jaroslav sneaked out of the house in the early morning, Dana talked to her mother in the kitchen, assuring her that her husband was still asleep. He jumped Šanda's fence and hid so that he had a view of the main entrance. He then put on a wig and nylon stockings on his face and proceeded to enter Šanda's house while he was in the barn. Jaroslav hid behind a curtain in the main hall, and when Šanda returned, he was knocked down and forced to give his attacker 40,000 CZK. But while handing over the money, Šanda pulled the stocking off from Stodola's face, and he strangled the pensioner in fear. Stodola then placed the body in a bed and lit some of the candles, before stealing a few items and running away. One of the candles caused a fire that destroyed the house. During the autopsy of the body, the doctor did not report any head injury and failed to notice any traces of strangulation. Since Šanda, despite his death, would rather burn his house than leave it to his children, his case was closed in 2002 as death without any external factors.

On 28 November 2001, Dana entered the house of 68-year-old neighbour Růžena Skohoutilová, who was known to possess valuable jewellery. While Jaroslav was watching in front of the house, Dana attacked the pensioner with a rod inside. They then both tied her up and beat her, asking her to point out where she was hiding her money. When Skohoutilová refused, the Stodolovis suffocated her with a scarf and pillow. Under her bed they found 50,000 CZK and stole some other things, before burying the body in the garden together with some papers and several daily necessities. They wanted to create the impression that the woman had gone on a vacation somewhere. The body of Skohoutilová was discovered by her son-in-law on 4 May 2002, during reconstruction of the house. The police accused a trio of men who robbed retirees in the neighbourhood of her murder, as they had attempted to rob the woman one week before her death, which she had mentioned to Dana's mother. It later turned out that the reason for her murder was that she had seen who was Jaroslav Šanda's killer.

On 30 April 2002, the spouses asked for water in front of the house of 66-year-old Antonin Král in the village of Měchonice. When he opened the door, he was pushed inside the house. There, he and his 62-year-old wife Marie were tied up, and each led to a separate room where they were forced to say where they were hiding their money. When Marie revealed the locations, both she and her husband were strangled by the Stodolas with a lamp cable. The bodies were untied and the gas stove was released. Dana walked out of the door with Jaroslav behind her, locking the house and stretching out from the toilet window. The dead couple were soon discovered by relatives, whom the neighbours informed of their disappearance. As a preliminary cause of death, suffocation by gas from the stove was determined. However, as it could have been a sloppy installation, investigators ordered an autopsy report. Although traces of strangulation were noted on the bodies, suffocation was put out as the official cause of death. The police also made a number of mistakes in the investigation, especially by ignoring the opinion of forensics experts.

Another murder was committed by Dana, without her husband being involved. On 14 September 2002, she travelled to Jindřichův Hradec in search of a job and accommodation, before going towards Kardašova Řečice. There she met 78-year-old Maria Čondlová, whose trust was won by the story of being a victim of the floods in Prague. The woman let Dana sleep in her house, and when she came from shopping the next day, she caught her visitor searching for her. Dana attacked the woman, overcoming her and tying her to a chair. She then demanded that Čondlová tell her where she keeps her money. When she refused, Dana put a gag in her mouth and hit her twice on the head with a roller pin before stabbing her in the chest four times. Afterwards, she searched through the house, cleaned it and then slept there for another night. Police investigated this case from the beginning as a murder, and even though they received a description of the offender, the search for her identity proved unsuccessful.

On 28 October 2002, the pair attacked 81-year-old Josef Malinů, who lived in the house opposite them. Malinů often boasted in public about having big amounts of monetary savings in his house. They waited for him to open the door in the morning so they could venture in. Jaroslav stunned the man with a heavy blow to the head and then brought him to the ground, where he tried to strangle him with a phone cord behind a beam. But the cable broke off and Malinů fell to the floor. Stodola then began kicking him in anger, and again tried to hang the body over the beam, but was unsuccessful. The couple then took 10,000 CZK from the house, but could not find the savings worth 2 million. Due to more mistakes in the investigation, there was no suspicion of foul play and Malinů's death was ruled as a suicide.

On 2 December 2002, the Stodolas broke into the Brněnec home of 92-year-old Božena Cerháková, who lived with her 52-year-old daughter Helena. Helena had planned to buy the dormitory that the Stodolas lived in at the time, and due to this, they assumed that she was rich. At the time of the burglary, Božena's other daughter, 62-year-old Dagmar Weiss, was visiting her. Dagmar tried to defend her mother, but she was beaten and tied up by Jaroslav. Helena then forced her sister to reveal where the money and savings were. The pair then decided to kill the three women, with Jaroslav strangling Dagmar with a scarf. He then lounged Božena on her bed and suffocated her with a pillow, before taking Helena to the bathroom and strangling her in the tub. After he left, Dana poured water and Helena's wrist to make it look like she had killed Dagmar and then committed suicide, leading to her mother's heart failure. Dana then went out from the main entrance and Jaroslav climbed out of the locked flat through a window above the main entrance. However, Božena had managed to survive the attack, and gave a very incoherent testimony, describing the offender as a tall man living in the hostel. The story was repeatedly connected to Jaroslav Stodola, who surprisingly told investigators he knew he was "suspected" of murder. However, according to the prosecutor, there was not enough evidence to accuse him of anything.

== Arrest, trial and sentence ==
Jaroslav's psychological condition rapidly deteriorated after the murders in Brněnec, later attempted suicide by taking sedatives in combination with alcohol. However, his wife managed to save him, and he soon recovered. Jaroslav later learned of a rich pensioner who lived in Onšovec, and at the end of January, the pair went to the place of the alleged residence, but could not locate the house. On 3 February 2003, he deliberately tarnished his wife with mud in front of 78-year-old Josef Peroutka's home in Hrádek. Jaroslav then rang the door and asked for water for his pregnant wife, who supposedly fainted in front of the house. He then asked the old man if he could sit on the stairs in front of the entrance and take some rest. When the retiree pushed through the gate, Jaroslav threatened him with a knife and forced him to enter the basement, where they locked him and speedily searched through the house, but only stole a cell phone and some sweets. While leaving, they encountered a policeman who had previously carried out investigations in connection with the suspected series of seniors' death in Slavošov and the surrounding area. Stodola was then arrested because of his criminal past. The policeman knew that the pair had stayed for a long time in a hostel in Brněnec and therefore asked why they were there. Jaroslav did not give satisfactory answers. Meanwhile, Josef Peroutka had managed to exit the basement on his own and reported the robbery by phone.

Stodola admitted his crimes but tried to downplay Dana's part in the crimes. Based on this crime, the double murder investigation in Brněnec, where the Stodolovis lived, was renewed, of which Jaroslav was originally suspected. Soon, physiological traces confirmed his presence at the crime scene. During the interrogations, Jaroslav insisted that only he had murdered, but during the reconstruction of the crimes, it turned out that he had no idea of a wound on Helena Cerháková's hands. After the investigation into the Brněnec murders, the ones in Slavošov and the surrounding areas soon followed. Stodola refused to admit that his wife had anything to do with the crimes, but the turnaround occurred when she began to testify about the murder of Maria Čondlová in Kardašova Řečice. The crime scene was described very precisely, and Jaroslav, according to his own words at this moment, finally admitted Dana's guilt. On 26 April 2004, both spouses were sentenced to life imprisonment by the Regional Court of Hradec Králové. During the sentence, they communicated exclusively in written letters, although they could associate. In 2006, the couple divorced in absence by mutual agreement.

== In popular culture ==
- One episode of Temný kraj was inspired by their murders.
- Mr. and Mrs. Stodola is a 2024 Czech-Slovak film directed by Petr Hátle that focuses on their relationship and murders they committed.

== See also ==
- List of serial killers by country
