= Hodonice =

Hodonice may refer to places in the Czech Republic:

- Hodonice (Tábor District), a municipality and village in the South Bohemian Region
- Hodonice (Znojmo District), a municipality and village in the South Moravian Region
