= Hodonice (Tábor District) =

- Municipality
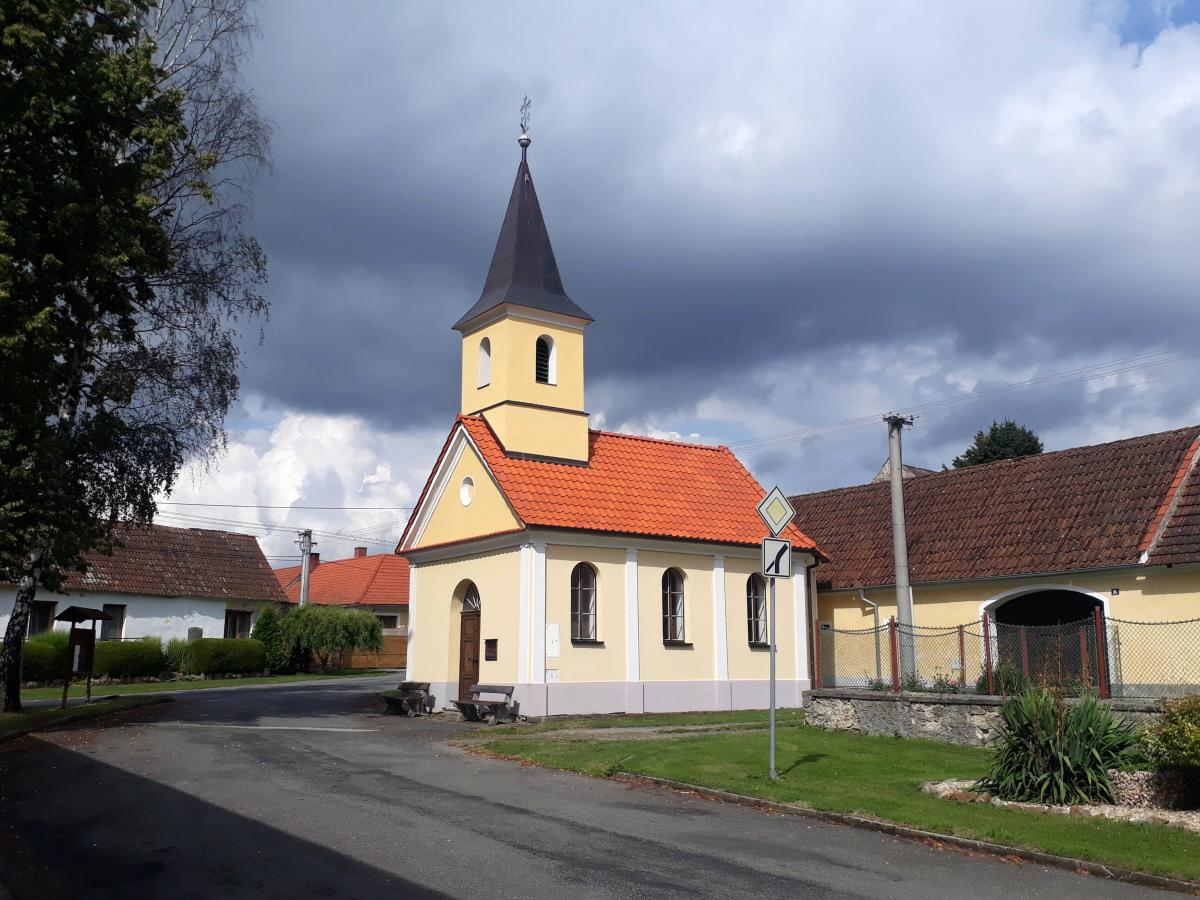
- Chapel of Saint John of Nepomuk

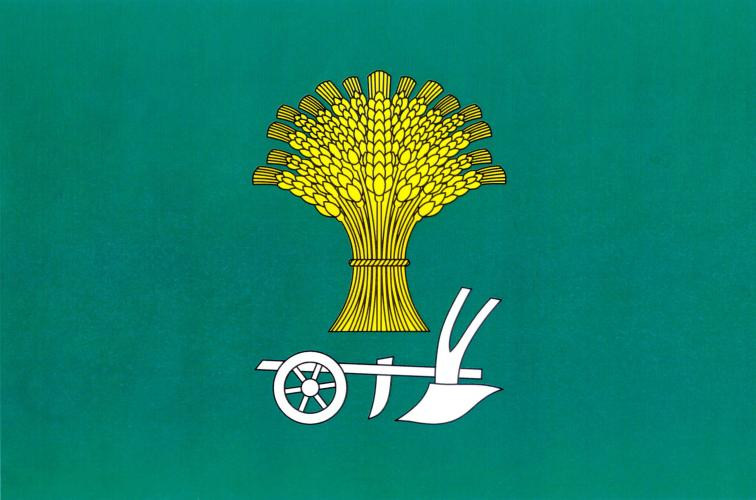
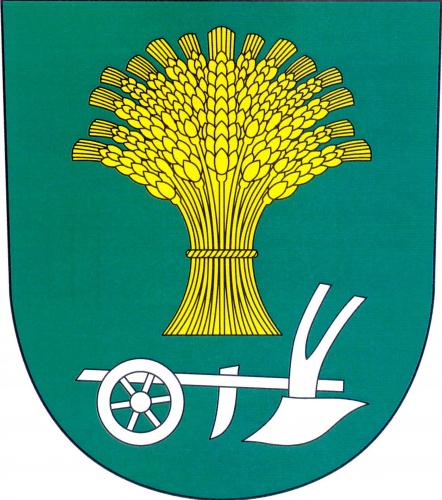
- Flag Coat of arms

- Location in the Czech Republic
- Coordinates: 49°16′7″N 14°29′15″E
- Country: Czech Republic
- Region: South Bohemian
- District: Tábor
- First mentioned: 1268

Area
  - Total: 9.47 km^{2} (3.66 sq mi)
- Elevation: 420 m (1,380 ft)

Population (2026-01-01)
  - Total: 131
  - Density: 13.8/km^{2} (35.8/sq mi)
- Time zone: UTC+1 (CET)
  - Summer (DST): UTC+2 (CEST)
- Postal code: 391 65
- Website: www.obechodonice.bechynsko.cz

Hodonice is a municipality and village in Tábor District in the South Bohemian Region of the Czech Republic. It has about 100 inhabitants.

Hodonice lies approximately 21 kilometres (13 mi) south-west of Tábor, 33 km (21 mi) north of České Budějovice, and 91 km (57 mi) south of Prague.

== Demographics ==
Historical population
Year	Pop.	±%
1869	339	—
1880	342	+0.9%
1890	323	−5.6%
1900	323	+0.0%
1910	351	+8.7%
1921	334	−4.8%
1930	340	+1.8%
1950	274	−19.4%
1961	253	−7.7%
1970	208	−17.8%
1980	146	−29.8%
1991	113	−22.6%
2001	129	+14.2%
2011	142	+10.1%
2021	120	−15.5%
Source: Censuses
