= Sudoměřice u Bechyně =

- Municipality
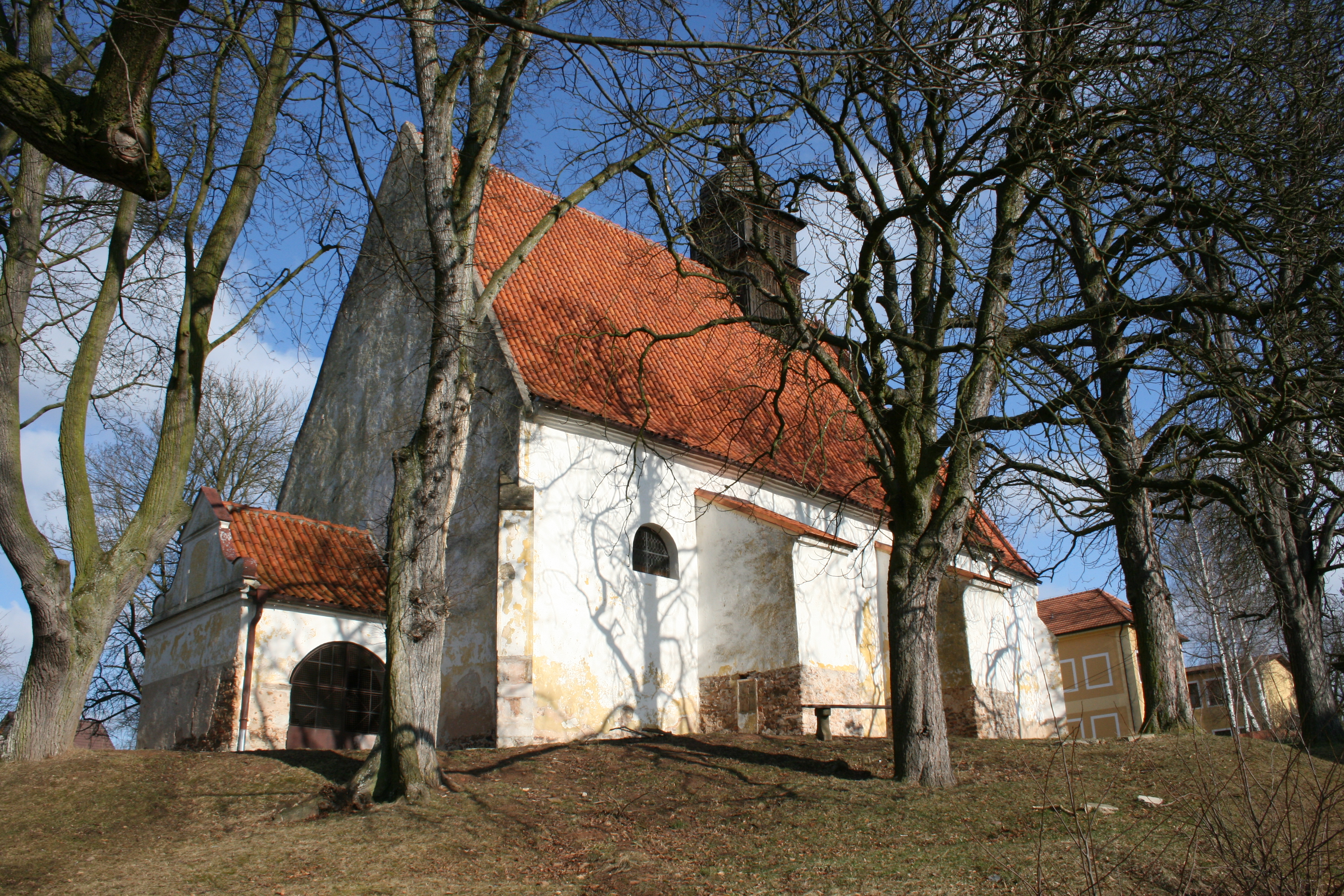
- Church of All Saints

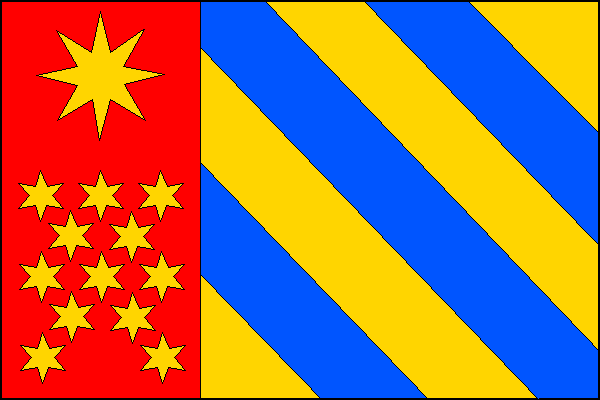
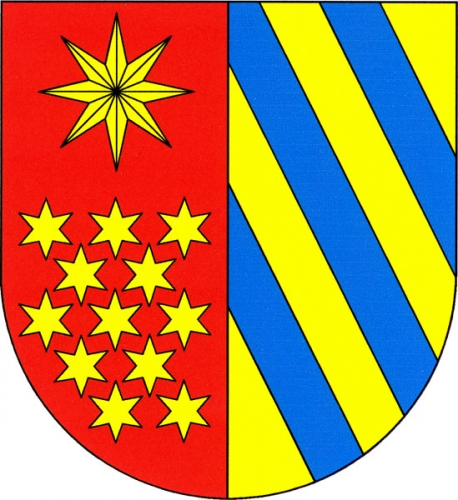
- Flag Coat of arms

- Location in the Czech Republic
- Coordinates: 49°17′23″N 14°32′18″E
- Country: Czech Republic
- Region: South Bohemian
- District: Tábor
- First mentioned: 1352

Area
  - Total: 24.90 km^{2} (9.61 sq mi)
- Elevation: 439 m (1,440 ft)

Population (2026-01-01)
  - Total: 765
  - Density: 30.7/km^{2} (79.6/sq mi)
- Time zone: UTC+1 (CET)
  - Summer (DST): UTC+2 (CEST)
- Postal code: 391 72
- Website: www.sudomerice.cz

Sudoměřice u Bechyně is a municipality and village in Tábor District in the South Bohemian Region of the Czech Republic. It has about 800 inhabitants.

Sudoměřice u Bechyně lies approximately 17 kilometres (11 mi) south-west of Tábor, 36 km (22 mi) north of České Budějovice, and 89 km (55 mi) south of Prague.

== Administrative division ==
Sudoměřice u Bechyně consists of three municipal parts (in brackets population according to the 2021 census):

- Sudoměřice u Bechyně (467)
- Bechyňská Smoleč (145)
- Bežerovice (154)

== Demographics ==
Historical population
Year	Pop.	±%
1869	910	—
1880	866	−4.8%
1890	804	−7.2%
1900	750	−6.7%
1910	807	+7.6%
1921	822	+1.9%
1930	869	+5.7%
1950	744	−14.4%
1961	775	+4.2%
1970	726	−6.3%
1980	652	−10.2%
1991	681	+4.4%
2001	616	−9.5%
2011	662	+7.5%
2021	766	+15.7%
Source: Censuses
