= Bečice =

Bečice may refer to places in the South Bohemian Region of the Czech Republic:

- Bečice (České Budějovice District)
- Bečice (Tábor District)
