= Bečice (Tábor District) =

- Municipality
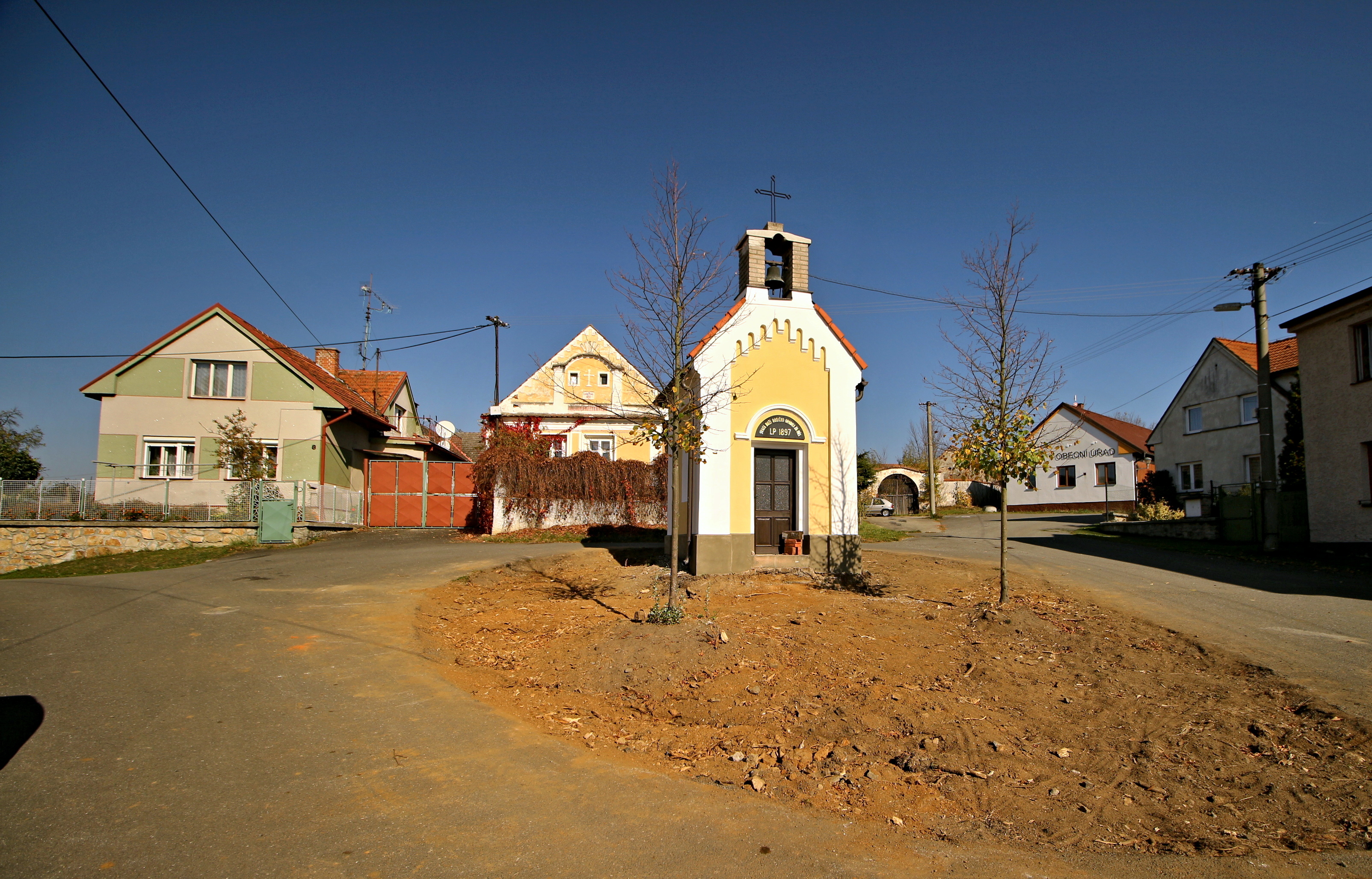
- Centre of Bečice

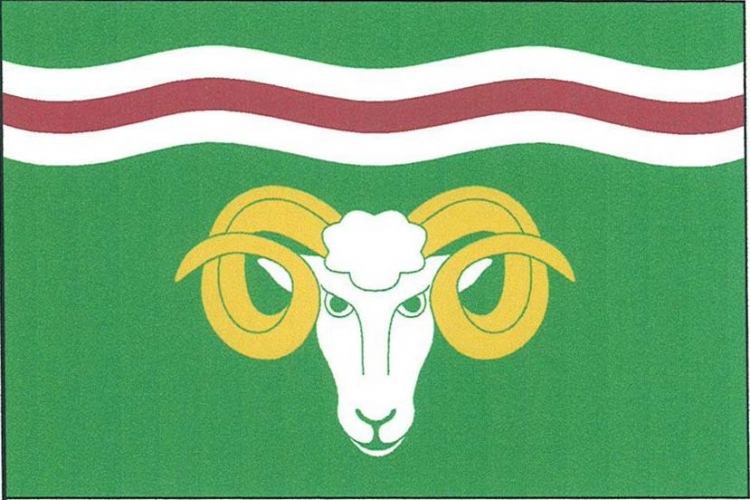
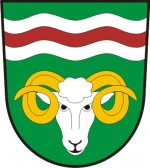
- Flag Coat of arms

- Location in the Czech Republic
- Coordinates: 49°22′58″N 14°33′12″E
- Country: Czech Republic
- Region: South Bohemian
- District: Tábor
- First mentioned: 1283

Area
  - Total: 3.24 km^{2} (1.25 sq mi)
- Elevation: 432 m (1,417 ft)

Population (2026-01-01)
  - Total: 80
  - Density: 25/km^{2} (64/sq mi)
- Time zone: UTC+1 (CET)
  - Summer (DST): UTC+2 (CEST)
- Postal code: 391 75
- Website: www.becice.cz

Bečice is a municipality and village in Tábor District in the South Bohemian Region of the Czech Republic. It has about 80 inhabitants.

Bečice lies approximately 9 kilometres (6 mi) south-west of Tábor, 46 km (29 mi) north of České Budějovice, and 79 km (49 mi) south of Prague.

== Demographics ==
Historical population
Year	Pop.	±%
1869	200	—
1880	216	+8.0%
1890	195	−9.7%
1900	181	−7.2%
1910	193	+6.6%
1921	155	−19.7%
1930	125	−19.4%
1950	123	−1.6%
1961	111	−9.8%
1970	93	−16.2%
1980	69	−25.8%
1991	67	−2.9%
2001	66	−1.5%
2011	70	+6.1%
2021	72	+2.9%
Source: Censuses
