= Gmünd, Lower Austria =

Gmünd
- Municipality
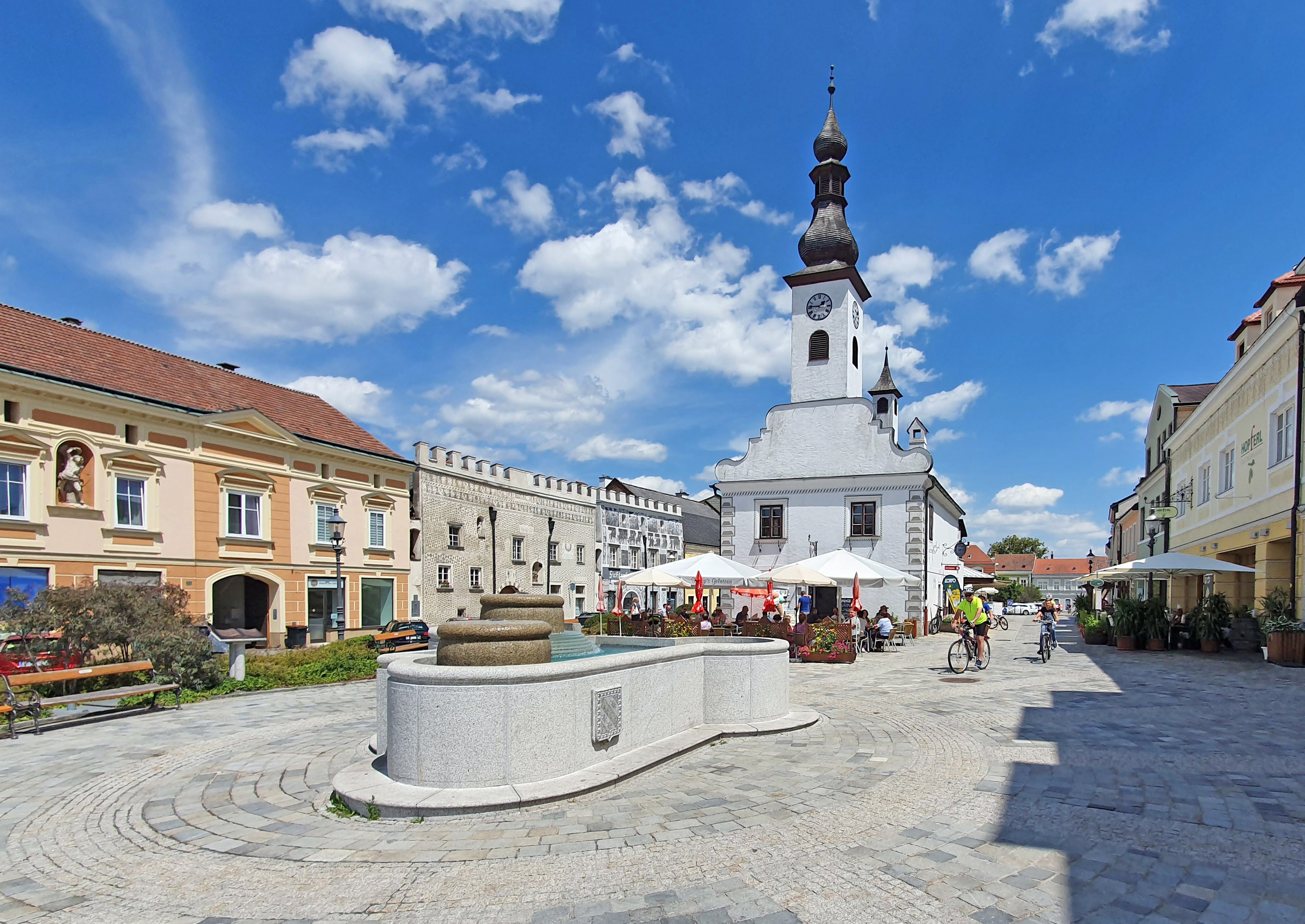
- Main square

- Coat of arms

- Location within Austria Gmünd (Austria)
- Coordinates: 48°46′N 14°59′E
- Country: Austria
- State: Lower Austria
- District: Gmünd

Government
  - Mayor: Helga Rosenmayer (ÖVP)

Area
  - Total: 25.11 km^{2} (9.70 sq mi)
- Elevation: 485 m (1,591 ft)

Population (2018-01-01)
  - Total: 5,375
  - Density: 214.1/km^{2} (554.4/sq mi)
- Time zone: UTC+1 (CET)
  - Summer (DST): UTC+2 (CEST)
- Postal code: 3950
- Area code: 02852
- Website: www.gmuend.at/de

Gmünd is a town in the Waldviertel region of Lower Austria in Austria, on the border with the Czech Republic. It is the administrative centre of Gmünd District, the north-westernmost district of Lower Austria. The municipality had 5,139 inhabitants on 1 January 2026.

The town lies opposite České Velenice, with which it has developed extensive cross-border connections. The two municipalities are legally and administratively separate and do not constitute a divided city. Their present relationship reflects the development of the railway junction in the 19th century, the Austrian–Czechoslovak border settlement after the First World War, the closure of the border during the Cold War and renewed cooperation since 1989.

Gmünd's development was shaped by the Emperor Franz Joseph Railway, the large First World War refugee camp from which the district of Gmünd-Neustadt developed, and its position at the meeting point of Austrian and Czech transport networks. It is also associated with the Blockheide nature park and with cross-border cooperation in healthcare, education, transport and culture.

== Geography ==
=== Location ===
Gmünd is situated in the north-western Waldviertel, near the confluence of the Lužnice and the Braunaubach. The town centre stands at an elevation of about 485 m (1,591 ft). The Czech border follows parts of the Lužnice and smaller watercourses immediately north and west of the built-up area.

The municipality covers 25.11 km^{2} (9.70 sq mi). Much of the Blockheide-Eibenstein nature park lies within its territory. The surrounding landscape forms part of the granite and gneiss highlands of the Waldviertel.

Gmünd borders the Czech municipalities of České Velenice, Rapšach and Nová Ves nad Lužnicí, and the Austrian municipalities of Brand-Nagelberg, Schrems, Hoheneich, Großdietmanns and Waldenstein.

=== Cross-border urban area ===
Gmünd and České Velenice form two adjacent urban centres on opposite sides of the state border. Their built-up areas are connected by roads, paths and railway infrastructure, while each town retains its own municipal administration and historical identity.

A 2026 case study by the European territorial-observation programme ESPON identified cross-border links in healthcare, education, transport, business, culture and tourism. According to the study, public services provided across the border in the wider Gmünd–České Velenice area have a catchment population of almost 60,000.

== History ==
=== Medieval and early modern period ===
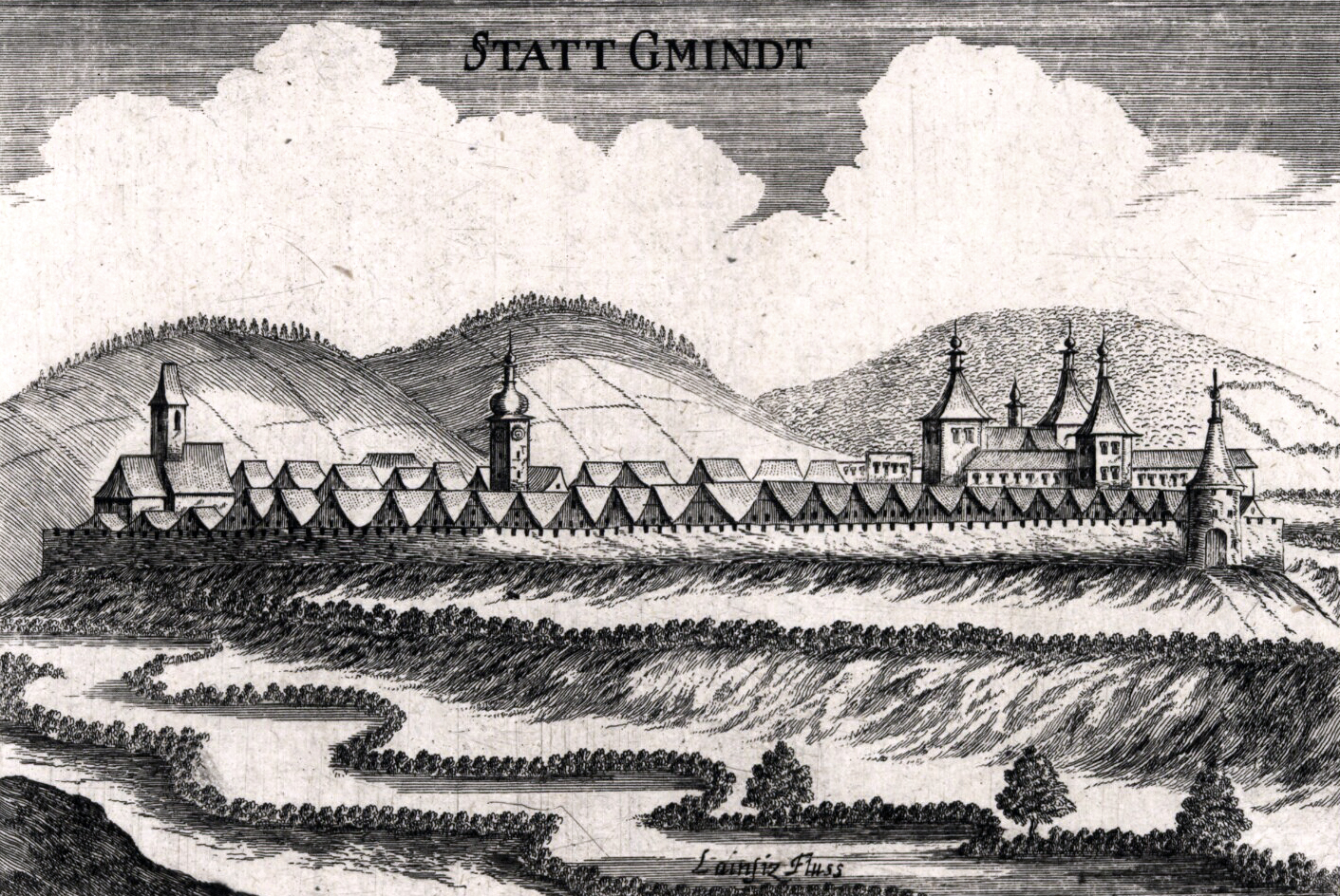
Gmünd in a 1672 engraving by Georg Matthäus Vischer

The name Gmünd derives from the Middle High German gemünde, meaning a confluence, and refers to the meeting of the Lainsitz and Braunaubach. A boundary document of 1179 described the location as the concursus duorum rivulorum, the confluence of two streams.

In the late 12th or early 13th century, Hadmar II of Kuenring established a planned fortified settlement at this strategically located crossing point between Austria and Bohemia. The medieval town occupied a terrace protected by the two watercourses. Its elongated market square was bounded by the castle in the south-west and the parish church in the north-east.

Gmünd was recorded as a market in 1278 and as a town in 1311. The medieval castle was repeatedly rebuilt and developed into the present Gmünd Castle. The town suffered damage during the Hussite incursions of 1426 and from several fires, including major fires in 1473 and 1763. Agriculture, milling, crafts and regional trade formed the basis of the local economy. In 1535 Gmünd received the right to hold a weekly market and two annual fairs.

The town ended its feudal obligations to the estate in 1810. Its economic structure changed substantially with the arrival of the railway during the second half of the 19th century.

=== Railway development and industrialisation ===
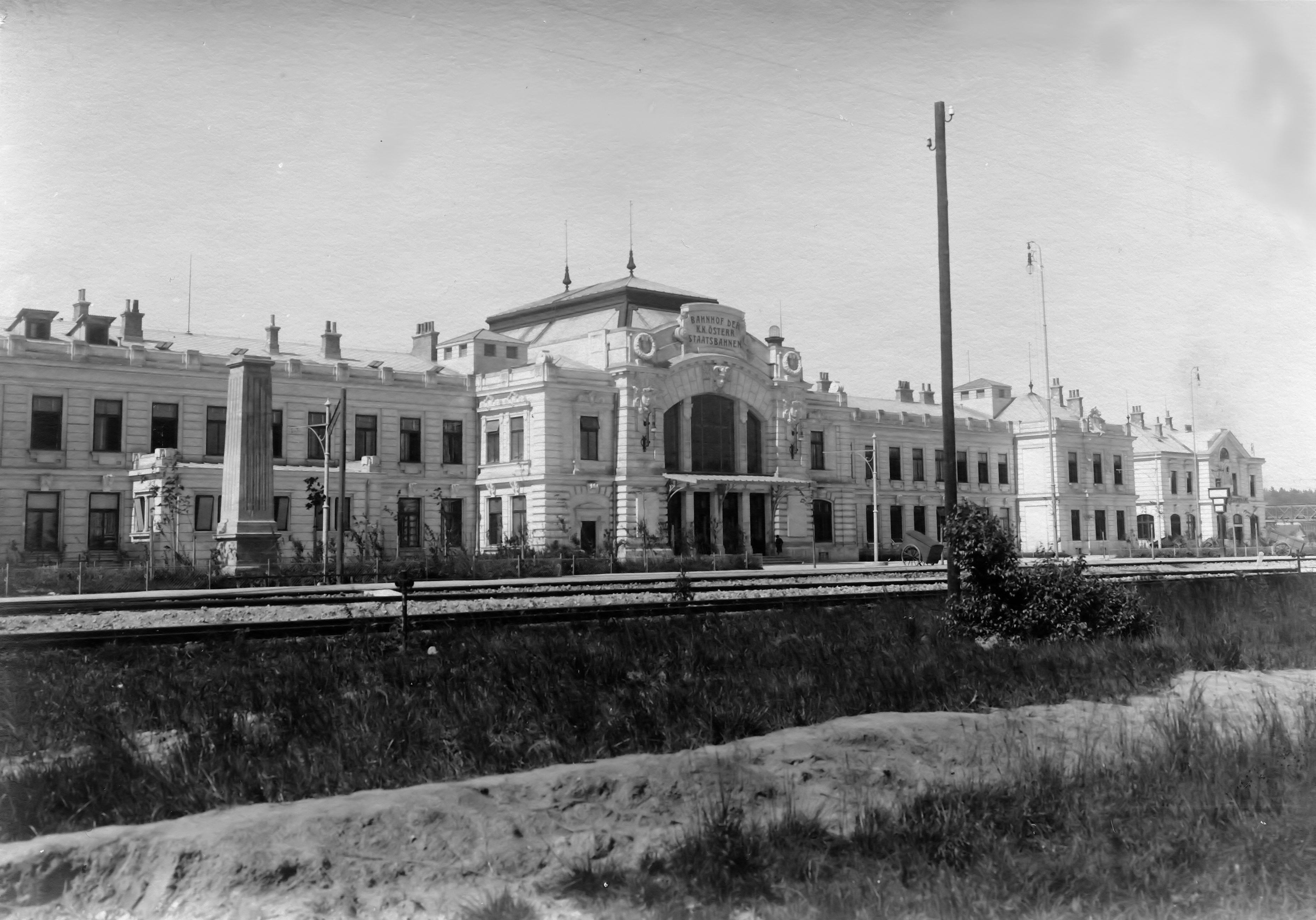
The former main railway station of Gmünd, now in České Velenice, around 1900

The Emperor Franz Joseph Railway between Vienna, Gmünd and Budweis opened in 1869. A continuous connection to Prague followed in 1871. The station, about 2.5 km (1.6 mi) north-west of the old town, became a junction for routes towards Prague, Budweis, Pilsen and Eger.

Railway workshops were built in 1872 and later expanded into a central repair facility. Around 1900 they employed approximately 800 workers. New residential districts developed for railway employees, including the Mexikosiedlung, named after Maximilian I of Mexico.

The Waldviertel narrow-gauge railways opened from Gmünd to Litschau and Heidenreichstein in 1900; the line through Weitra to Groß Gerungs was completed in 1903. Between 1907 and 1916 an early trolleybus system connected the town centre with the main station. It was the first trolleybus operation in Austria.

Gmünd became the seat of the newly created political district in 1899 and of the judicial district in 1909. A political district is an administrative subdivision of an Austrian federal state, headed by a district authority.

=== First World War refugee camp ===
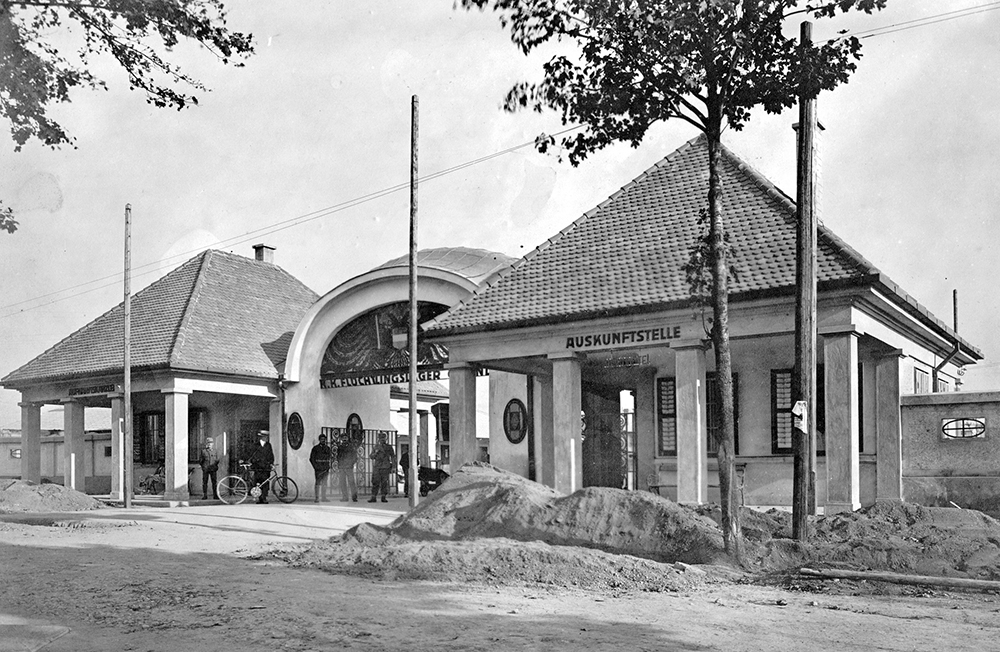
Former main entrance to the Gmünd refugee camp; the building now houses the Haus der Gmünder Zeitgeschichte

In 1914, shortly after the beginning of the First World War, a large refugee camp was constructed south of Gmünd for civilians evacuated from Galicia and Bukovina. After Italy entered the war, refugees from Istria and other parts of the northern Adriatic region were also accommodated there.

The camp was designed to house about 30,000 people at one time. It functioned as a largely self-contained settlement with water and electricity supplies, kitchens, a hospital, schools, orphanages, workshops, a fire brigade, a post and telegraph office, a Greek Catholic church, a theatre and a railway connection. Published local histories estimate that approximately 200,000 people passed through the camp between 1914 and 1918. An estimated 30,000 refugees died from infectious diseases, malnutrition and inadequate sanitary conditions and were buried in the camp cemetery.

The camp lost its original purpose at the end of the war. Most surviving refugees returned to their regions of origin, while buildings were sold, demolished or adapted. The street grid of the later Gmünd-Neustadt district preserves the layout of the approximately 55 ha (136 acres) camp. Housing, businesses and the district's first hospital were subsequently established on the site.

The Haus der Gmünder Zeitgeschichte, a local museum of contemporary history, opened in 2019 in the former information building at the camp's main entrance.

=== Border settlement and the creation of České Velenice ===
Following the collapse of Austria-Hungary, the Treaty of Saint-Germain-en-Laye, signed in September 1919 and effective from July 1920, established the border between Austria and Czechoslovakia. The part of the former municipal territory lying north of the new border, including the main railway station and railway workshops, became part of Czechoslovakia and was subsequently named České Velenice. Gmünd therefore lost the railway installations that had contributed substantially to its development during the late 19th century.

The Gmünd Stadt railway stop was expanded to become the principal station on the Austrian side. Part of the northern route of the Waldviertel narrow-gauge railway initially continued across Czechoslovak territory; it was moved entirely onto Austrian territory in 1950.

Railway employees displaced by the border settlement moved to Gmünd and other Austrian railway centres. The town's population rose to more than 5,000 by 1923 and more than 6,000 by 1934. Housing and industrial premises were developed on the former refugee-camp site, contributing to the growth of Gmünd-Neustadt.

The border remained comparatively permeable during the interwar period. Some supply networks continued across it, and České Velenice initially obtained water and electricity from the Austrian side.

=== Nazi period and Second World War ===
Following the Munich Agreement and the German occupation of Czechoslovak border areas in October 1938, České Velenice was placed under German control and administered with Gmünd. It was formally incorporated into the municipality in 1942.

The Jewish community of Gmünd and the neighbouring railway settlements had developed primarily after the opening of the Franz Joseph Railway. A Jewish prayer association was founded in 1910. By 1930, Gmünd had the third-largest Jewish community in the Waldviertel. Following the Anschluss in 1938, Jewish residents were subjected to dispossession, forced removal, deportation and murder under Nazi rule.

On 22 December 1944, about 1,700 Hungarian Jews deported from Budapest arrived in Gmünd and were interned in a grain warehouse. By 16 February 1945, 485 people had died; they were buried in what is now České Velenice. The municipal medical officer Arthur Lanc and his wife Maria supplied prisoners with assistance and hid three Jewish forced labourers, preventing their further deportation. Both were later recognised by Yad Vashem as Righteous Among the Nations. A memorial stone for the victims was erected near the former warehouse in 1970.

The railway station and workshops were heavily damaged in an American air raid on 23 March 1945. After the defeat of Nazi Germany, the 1920 state border was restored and České Velenice again became part of Czechoslovakia.

=== Cold War and the period after 1989 ===
After the Communist takeover in Czechoslovakia in 1948, the border became part of the Iron Curtain. Cross-border roads were closed or tightly controlled, railway services were restricted and many of the earlier everyday connections between Gmünd and České Velenice were interrupted. Border barriers and surveillance installations were erected on the Czechoslovak side.

The opening of the border in 1989 restored direct contact between the two towns. Austria's accession to the European Union in 1995, the Czech Republic's accession in 2004 and the Czech Republic's entry into the Schengen Area in 2007 progressively reduced formal border controls.

Cross-border projects have since addressed transport, healthcare, education, environmental management, business and cultural exchange. The Access Industrial Park was developed on both sides of the border as a joint Austrian–Czech business area. The towns also cooperate through the biennial Übergänge–Přechody cultural festival and historical projects concerned with the shared border region.

The Lower Austrian State Exhibition is planned to take place in Gmünd in 2028, with water landscapes of the Waldviertel as its central subject. The Palm House is intended to serve as the principal exhibition venue and is to be renovated and extended for the event.

== Culture and places of interest ==
=== Historic town centre and fortifications ===
The historic centre is arranged around an elongated main square. Surviving sections of the medieval town wall and towers mark the former limits of the fortified settlement.

Buildings around the square include the former town hall, originally a 16th-century courthouse and market building, and late 16th- and early 17th-century town houses with sgraffito façades depicting biblical and classical subjects. The Old Forge, first documented in 1569, preserves historical workshop equipment and is used as a museum forge.

The Roman Catholic parish church of Saint Stephen incorporates Romanesque, Gothic and later elements. Its chancel was extended in 1981–82 to designs by Clemens Holzmeister. Other religious buildings include the Protestant Church of Peace, constructed in 1910–11, and the Sacred Heart Church in Gmünd-Neustadt, completed in 1953.

=== Gmünd Castle and Palm House ===
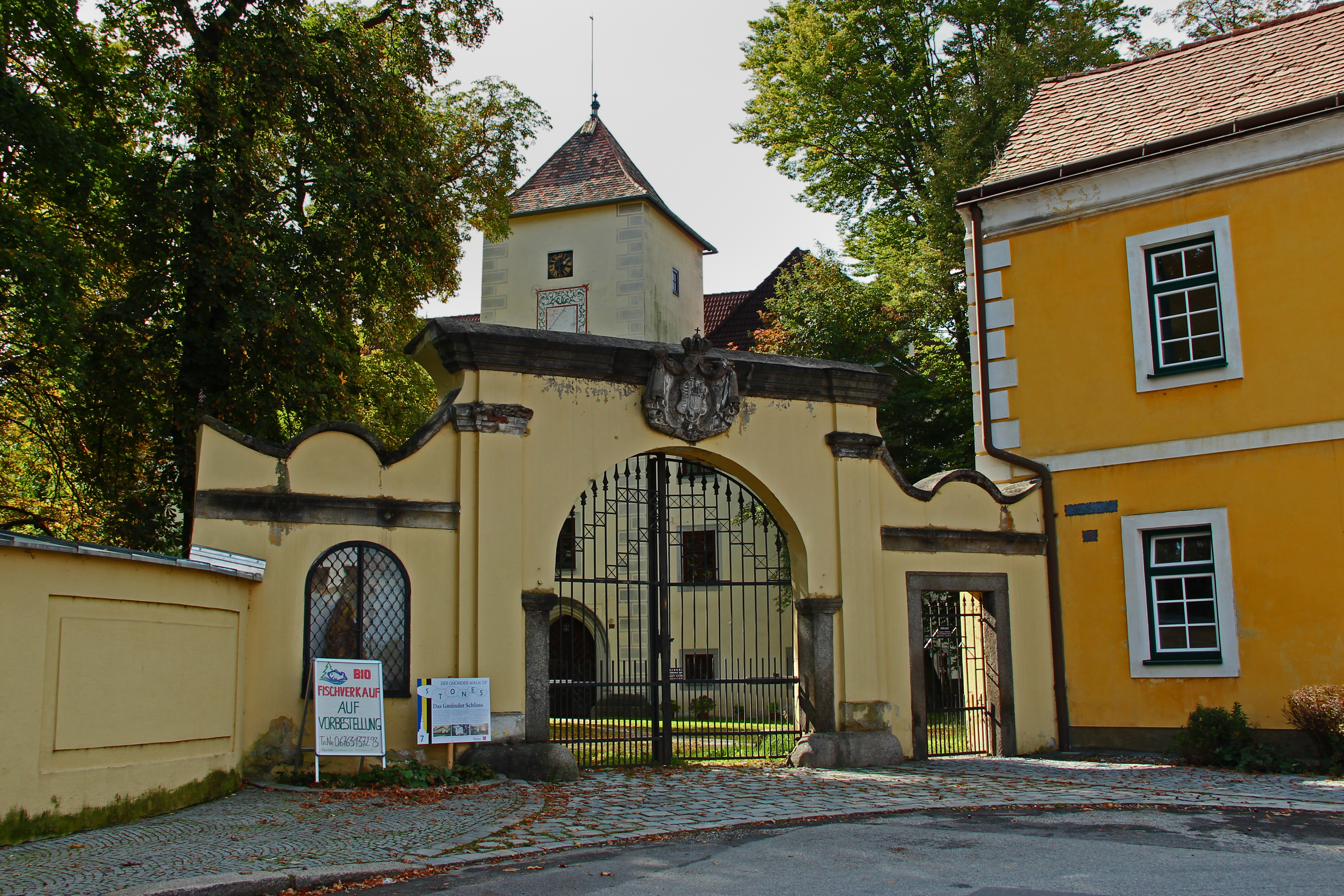
Gmünd Castle

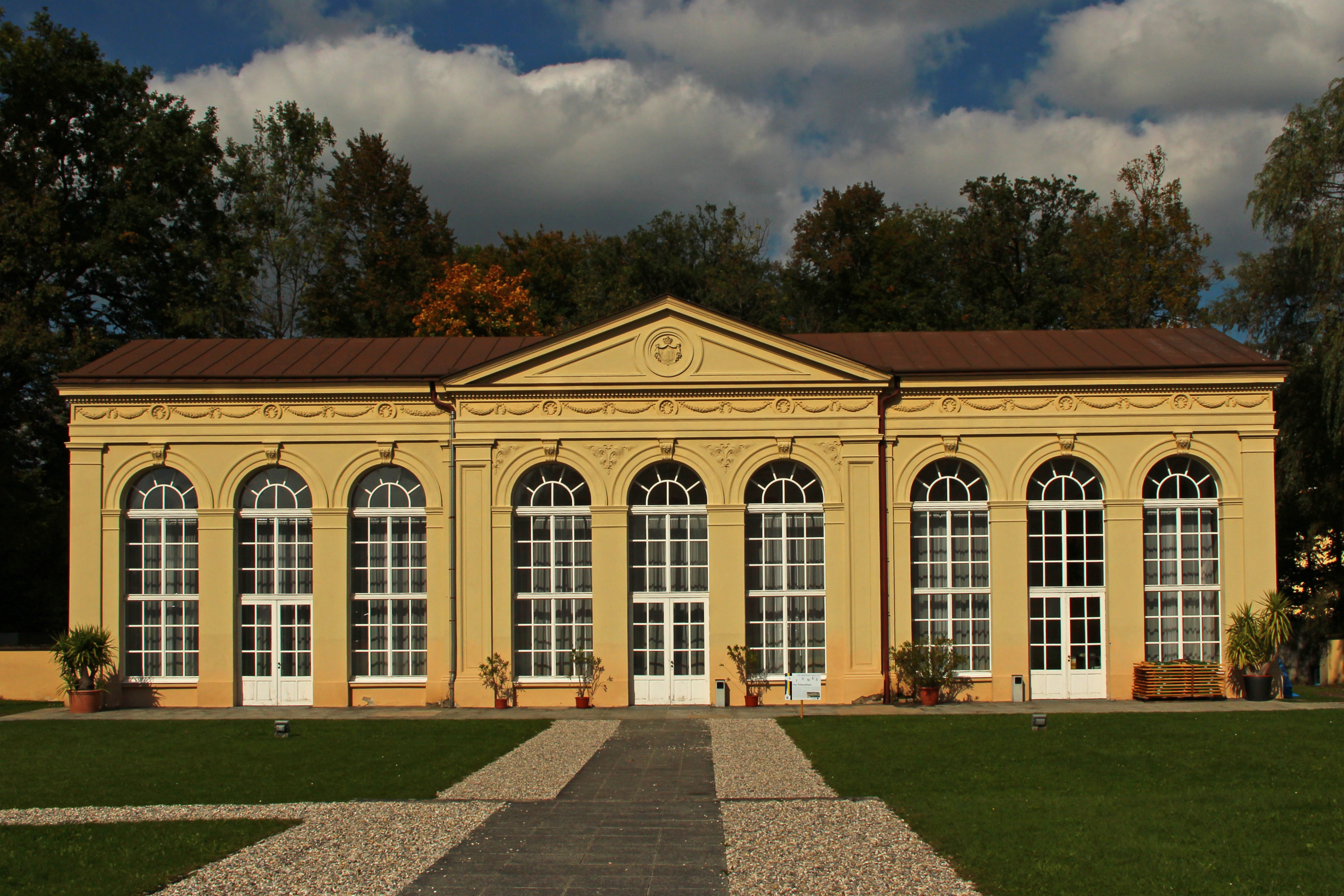
The former Palm House in the castle park

Gmünd Castle developed from the medieval town castle. It retains a Romanesque core and a Gothic gate tower, was extensively altered in the 15th and 16th centuries and became a four-wing complex during the 17th century. It is surrounded by a landscape park laid out in the English style.

The Palm House in the castle park was built in the second half of the 19th century for Archduke Sigismund of Austria. The early Historicist greenhouse was restored in the 1980s and subsequently adapted for exhibitions and cultural events. It is the planned central venue of the 2028 Lower Austrian State Exhibition.

=== Blockheide ===
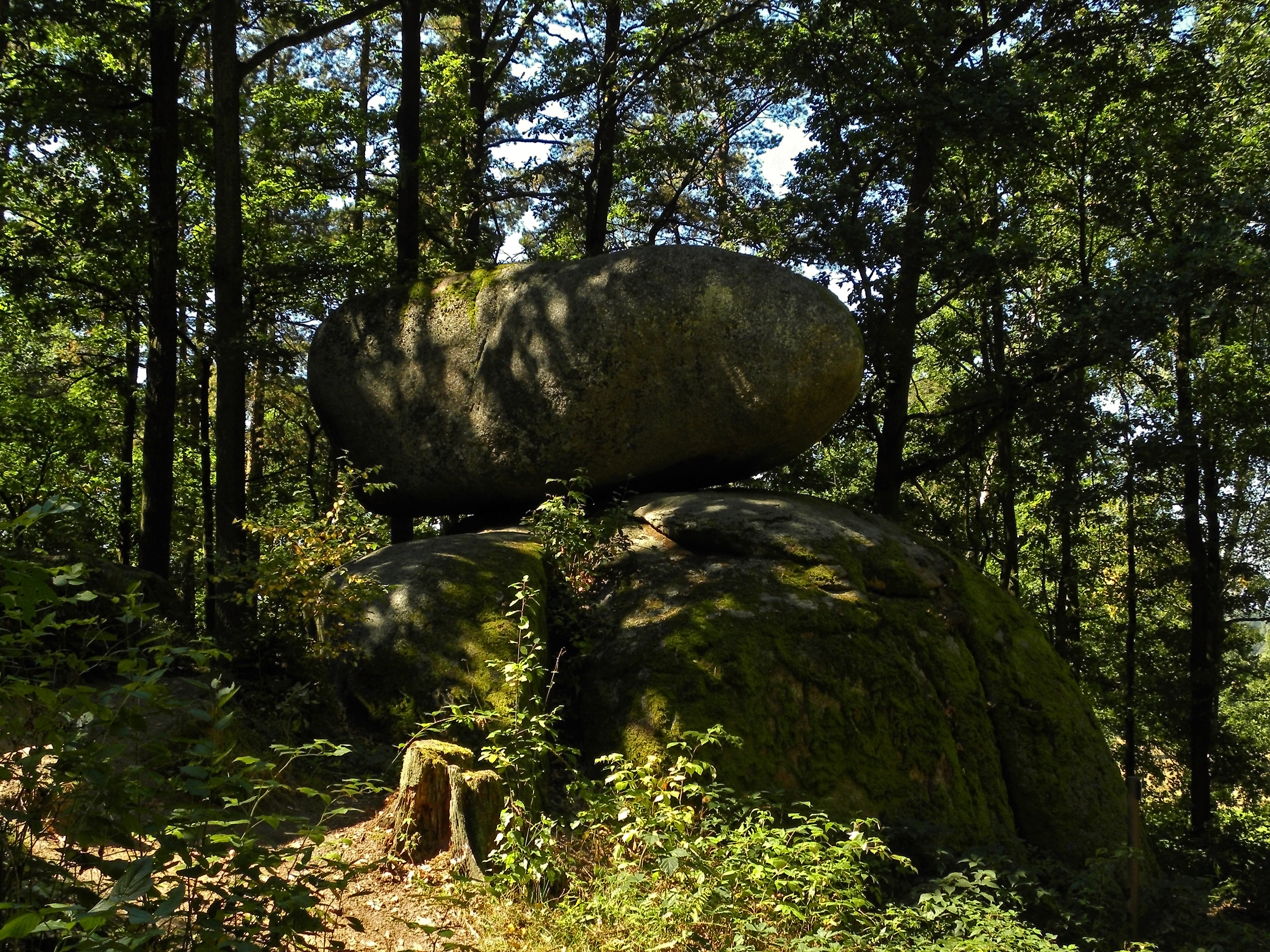
Granite formation in the Blockheide nature park

The Blockheide-Eibenstein nature park, established in 1964, protects a cultural landscape characterised by heathland, meadows, woodland and exposed granite formations. Several of the granite blocks are rocking stones. A viewing tower approximately 30 m (98 ft) high provides views across the Waldviertel and towards South Bohemia.

The nature park is crossed by walking paths and by the 15th meridian east, on which Central European Time is based. Other protected landscapes in the municipality include the Malerwinkel along the Braunaubach and wetland habitats in the Lainsitz valley.

=== Museums and memorial sites ===
The municipal museum is housed in the former town hall and presents the history of Gmünd and its surroundings. The Haus der Gmünder Zeitgeschichte documents the First World War refugee camp, the border settlement, the Nazi period and the Cold War.

Memorials include the stone commemorating the 485 Jewish prisoners who died in 1944–45 and sites associated with Arthur and Maria Lanc. A cross-border historical trail connects locations in Gmünd and České Velenice.

The Carl Hermann House is associated with the sculptor Carl Hermann, who lived in Gmünd from 1945 until his death in 1986. Cultural activity also takes place in the Palm House, the Kulturhaus, the former Bobbin factory and the castle park.

== Economy and infrastructure ==
Gmünd is an employment and service centre for the upper Waldviertel. In 2021 the municipality contained 633 non-agricultural workplaces with 5,115 employees. Almost 4,000 people commuted into the town for work, giving Gmünd substantially more jobs than employed residents.

Manufacturing includes the Gmünd potato-starch plant operated by Agrana, the only plant of its kind in Austria. The construction group Leyrer + Graf has its headquarters in the town. Information technology and communications companies also operate in Gmünd. The cross-border Access Industrial Park provides business sites in both Austria and the Czech Republic.

Retail, public administration, schools, healthcare and other services account for a substantial proportion of employment. As the seat of the district authority, Gmünd provides administrative services for the surrounding district.

=== Tourism ===
Tourism is based primarily on the Blockheide, the historic centre, the Waldviertel narrow-gauge railway, cycling routes and spa facilities. The Sole-Felsen-Bad swimming and spa complex opened in 2006, followed by an adjacent hotel in 2010.

In 2025, accommodation establishments in Gmünd recorded 47,474 arrivals and 94,258 overnight stays, the highest number of arrivals among municipalities in the Waldviertel tourism region.

The Iron Curtain Trail, designated as EuroVelo 13, passes through Gmünd along the former East–West border. Tourist trains on the Waldviertel narrow-gauge railway operate from Gmünd towards Groß Gerungs and Litschau using diesel and, on selected services, steam locomotives.

=== Healthcare ===
Gmünd is a location for cross-border healthcare cooperation between Lower Austria and the South Bohemian Region. Since the 2010s, successive Healthacross projects have enabled residents of the Czech border region to use selected medical services in Gmünd. The cooperation initially included outpatient treatment and was subsequently extended to some inpatient services.

The Healthacross MED Gmünd centre, opened near the Czech border in 2021, provides outpatient medical and therapeutic services for patients from both Austria and the Czech Republic. It was developed through cooperation between Lower Austria and South Bohemia with support from the European Union. The European Commission has presented the Healthacross initiative as an example of reducing administrative and geographical barriers to healthcare in a border region and improving access to services on both sides of the border.

== Transport ==
Gmünd lies on the Franz Joseph Railway between Vienna and České Velenice. Regional trains connect the town with Vienna Franz-Josefs-Bahnhof, Sigmundsherberg, Schwarzenau and České Velenice, where connections are available towards České Budějovice and other destinations in the Czech Republic. Service patterns vary by timetable period.

The station is also the operating centre of the Waldviertel narrow-gauge railway. Its surviving routes are used mainly for seasonal and heritage services to Groß Gerungs and Litschau.

The principal road connection is the B41, which links Gmünd with Schrems, Waidhofen an der Thaya and the wider Austrian road network. Road crossings connect the municipality with České Velenice and the surrounding South Bohemian region. Regional bus services link Gmünd with other settlements in the district.

Cycling and walking routes cross the border at several points, including routes connected with EuroVelo 13.

== Education ==
Gmünd has primary schools, lower secondary schools, vocational schools and a federal upper secondary school, the BG/BRG Gmünd. Educational institutions serve pupils from the town and the surrounding district.

Cross-border educational cooperation includes German- and Czech-language projects and contacts between schools in Gmünd and South Bohemia. The range of vocational education reflects the town's role as the administrative and employment centre of the district.

== Politics ==
The municipal council has 29 members. Following the 2025 Lower Austrian municipal election, the seats were distributed as follows:

- Austrian People's Party (ÖVP): 15
- Social Democratic Party of Austria (SPÖ): 9
- Freedom Party of Austria (FPÖ): 4
- AFG – Aktiv für Gmünd: 1

Helga Rosenmayer of the ÖVP has served as mayor since 2015.

The municipal coat of arms was formally granted in 1852. It is derived from the arms of the Styrian branch of the Liechtenstein family, former holders of the Gmünd estate.

== Notable people ==
- Sara Vilic (born 1992), triathlete

=== Associated with Gmünd ===
- Archduke Rainer Ferdinand of Austria (1827–1913) and Archduchess Maria Karoline of Austria (1825–1915), who regularly stayed at Gmünd Castle
- Johann Brotan (1843–1918), engineer and inventor of the Brotan boiler, who headed the Gmünd railway workshops
- Sofia Okunevska (1865–1926), medical doctor who worked in the Gmünd refugee camp during the First World War
- Franz Kafka (1883–1924), writer who met Milena Jesenská in Gmünd in August 1920; the meeting and the newly established border are referred to in his Letters to Milena
- Clemens Holzmeister (1886–1983), architect who designed the extension of Saint Stephen's Church
- Arthur Lanc (1907–1995), recognised as Righteous Among the Nations for rescuing Jewish forced labourers
- Carl Hermann (1918–1986), sculptor who lived and worked in Gmünd

== Cross-border partnerships ==
Gmünd and České Velenice cooperate in public services, culture, education, transport, tourism and historical projects, but do not have a formal twinning agreement.

Gmünd is also a member of the association Gmünder in Europa, a network of European towns and localities whose names contain Gmünd or a related form. Members include Schwäbisch Gmünd, Gmünd, Carinthia, Angermünde, Gemünden am Main, Kabelsketal and Seßlach.
