= Nová Bystřice =

- Town
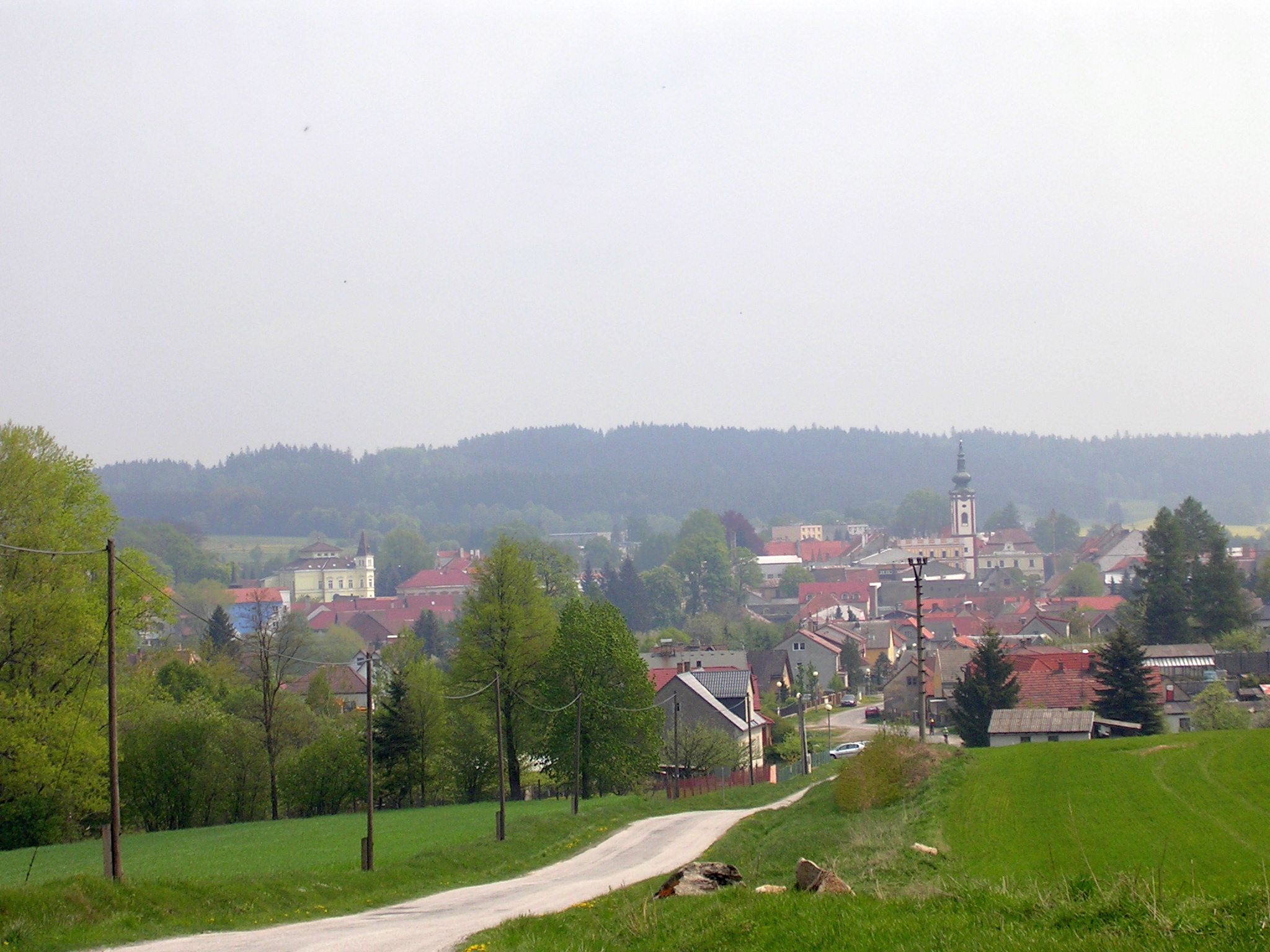
- View from Smrčná

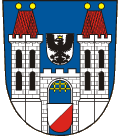
- Flag Coat of arms

- Location in the Czech Republic
- Coordinates: 49°1′10″N 15°6′11″E
- Country: Czech Republic
- Region: South Bohemian
- District: Jindřichův Hradec
- First mentioned: 1175

Government
  - Mayor: Jiří Zimola

Area
  - Total: 81.83 km^{2} (31.59 sq mi)
- Elevation: 588 m (1,929 ft)

Population (2026-01-01)
  - Total: 3,209
  - Density: 39.22/km^{2} (101.6/sq mi)
- Time zone: UTC+1 (CET)
  - Summer (DST): UTC+2 (CEST)
- Postal code: 378 33
- Website: www.novabystrice.cz

Nová Bystřice (Czech pronunciation: [ˈnovaː ˈbɪstr̝̊ɪtsɛ]; German: Neubistritz) is a town in Jindřichův Hradec District in the South Bohemian Region of the Czech Republic. It has about 3,200 inhabitants. The town is located in the Javořice Highlands on the border with Austria.

The historic town centre is well preserved and is protected as an urban monument zone. The main landmark of Nová Bystřice is the Church of Saints Peter and Paul.

== Administrative division ==
Nová Bystřice consists of 13 municipal parts (in brackets population according to the 2021 census):

- Nová Bystřice (2,449)
- Albeř (136)
- Artolec (49)
- Blato (33)
- Hradiště (51)
- Hůrky (143)
- Klášter (46)
- Klenová (27)
- Nový Vojířov (59)
- Ovčárna (67)
- Senotín (19)
- Skalka (5)
- Smrčná (5)

== Etymology ==
The name Bystřice is derived from the old Czech adjective bystrá, which used to mean 'fast-flowing', 'rapid'. It referred to the local watercourses. After it was rebuilt in the first half of the 15th century, the settlement became known as Nová ('new') Bystřice.

== Geography ==
Nová Bystřice is located about 15 kilometres (9 mi) southeast of Jindřichův Hradec. It lies on the border with Austria, close to Austria's northernmost point near Haugschlag.

Nová Bystřice lies in the Javořice Highlands. Most of the municipal territory lies in the Česká Kanada Nature Park. The highest point is the hill Kunějovský vrch at 725 m (2,379 ft) above sea level. The Dračice River flows through the town. The stream Koštěnický potok flows along the western municipal border. There are several fishponds in the municipal territory, the largest of which is Osika with an area of 61.7 ha (152 acres).

== History ==
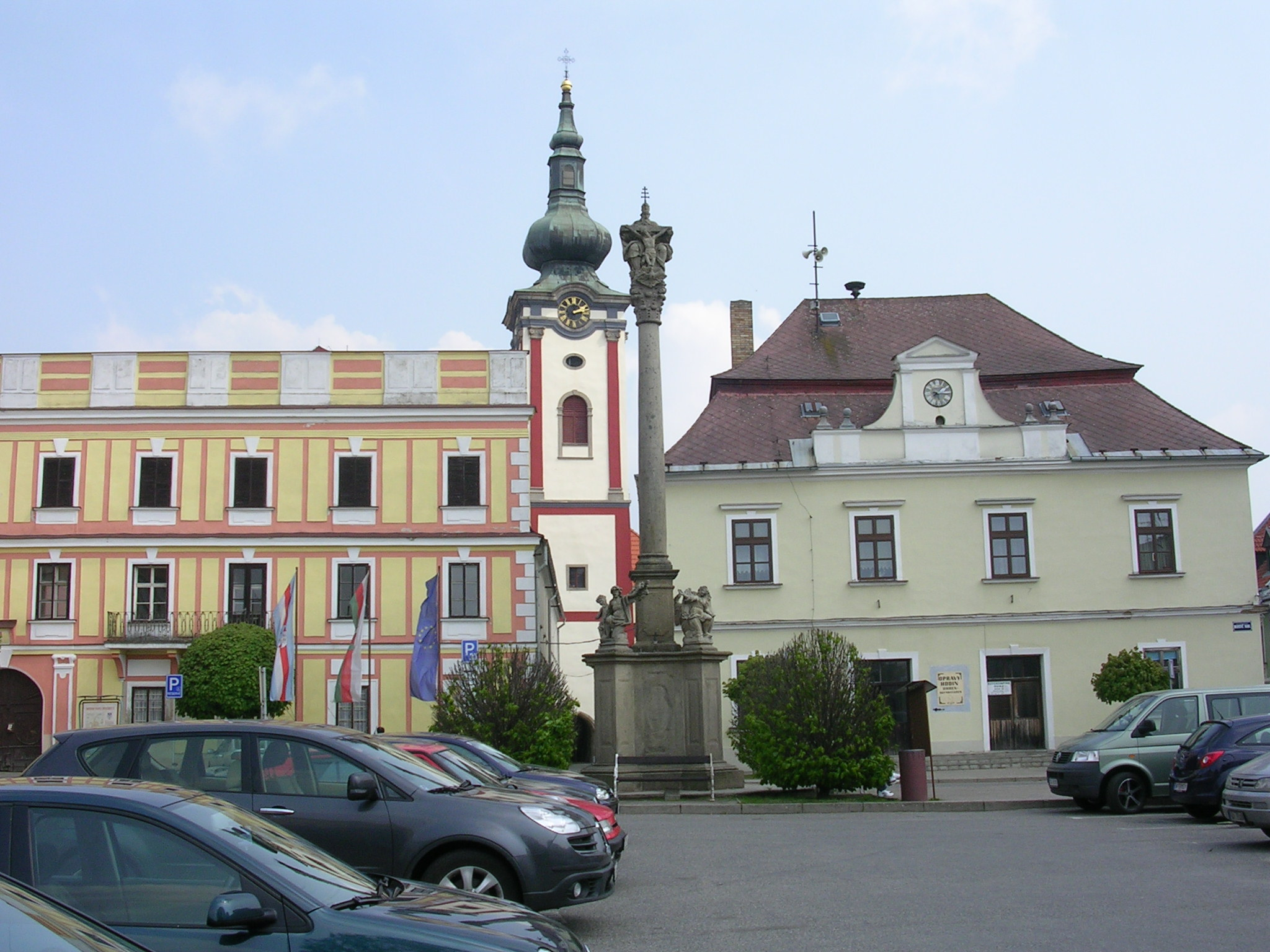
Main square with Nová Bystřice Castle

The first written mention of Bystřice is from 1175, when the area was colonised by Knights Hospitaller of the Mailberg commandry, at the behest of the Nuremberg burgrave Conrad II of Raabs. In 1260, the estate was enfeoffed to the Rosenberg family by King Ottokar II. From the 13th to 16th century, Bystřice was a part of the Landštejn estate.

In 1276, the Landštejn estate became the personal dominion of Judith of Habsburg, who later became Bohemian Queen. From 1282, it was owned by the Lords of Landštejn. A rebellion of Vilém of Landštejn in 1318 led to a great famine. In 1341, during the reign of King John of Bohemia, Nová Bystřice became a town. From 1381 to 1575, the town was property of the Krajíř of Krajek family. The town was burned down by Jan Žižka during the Hussite Wars in 1420. Shortly after, it was rebuilt and since then it has been called Nová Bystřice.

The Paulaner Order came to the region in 1493 and founded here a monastery. In 1533, a group of religious reformers killed 40 monks and destroyed the monastery. After the family of Krajíř of Krajek became extinct in 1575, Nová Bystřice was shortly owned by the Lobkowicz and Kinsky families. In 1615, it was bought by Countess Lucie Otýlie of Hradec. During the rule of her son Adam Pavel Slavata, Nová Bystřice experienced the greatest development. He re-established the Paulaner monastery, but it was abolished in 1783. After the last member of the Slavata family died, the owners of the town frequently changed until the establishment of a sovereign municipality in 1850.

In 1945 the German population was expelled according to the Beneš decrees and replaced by Czechs. During the Cold War, the Iron Curtain garrison was located in the town. The village of Mnich, part of Nová Bystřice, was abandoned in 1952 due to its vicinity to the border.

== Demographics ==
Historical population

Year	Pop.	±%
1869	8,652	—
1880	8,492	−1.8%
1890	8,012	−5.7%
1900	7,661	−4.4%
1910	7,511	−2.0%

Year	Pop.	±%
1921	6,687	−11.0%
1930	6,259	−6.4%
1950	4,214	−32.7%
1961	3,615	−14.2%
1970	3,419	−5.4%

Year	Pop.	±%
1980	3,215	−6.0%
1991	3,303	+2.7%
2001	3,407	+3.1%
2011	3,258	−4.4%
2021	3,089	−5.2%

Source: Censuses

== Economy ==
Textile industry was the traditional business activity, however the 2000s saw a drop in the demand. Alma Nová Bystřice and Otavan factories finished their operations.

== Transport ==
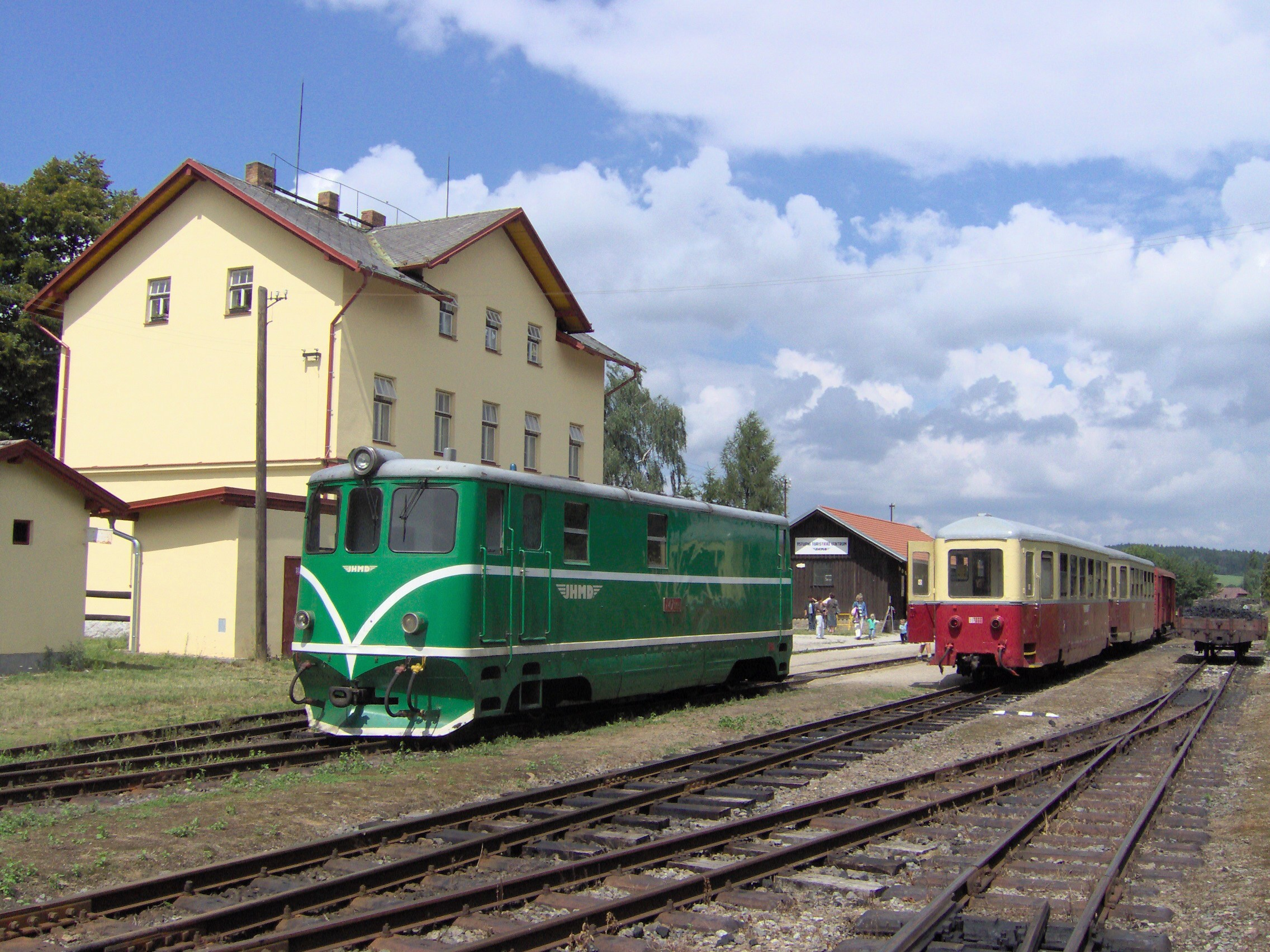
Railway station

On the Czech–Austrian border is the Nová Bystřice / Grametten road border crossing.

Nová Bystřice is the endpoint of the Jindřichův Hradec narrow-gauge railway. During the tourist season, some of the trains are powered by historic steam engines and offer various entertainment.

== Sport ==
The Monachus golf resort, situated on the town's southwestern edge, is a major attraction for golfers. It consists of 18-hole championship course and nine-hole public golf academy.

== Sights ==
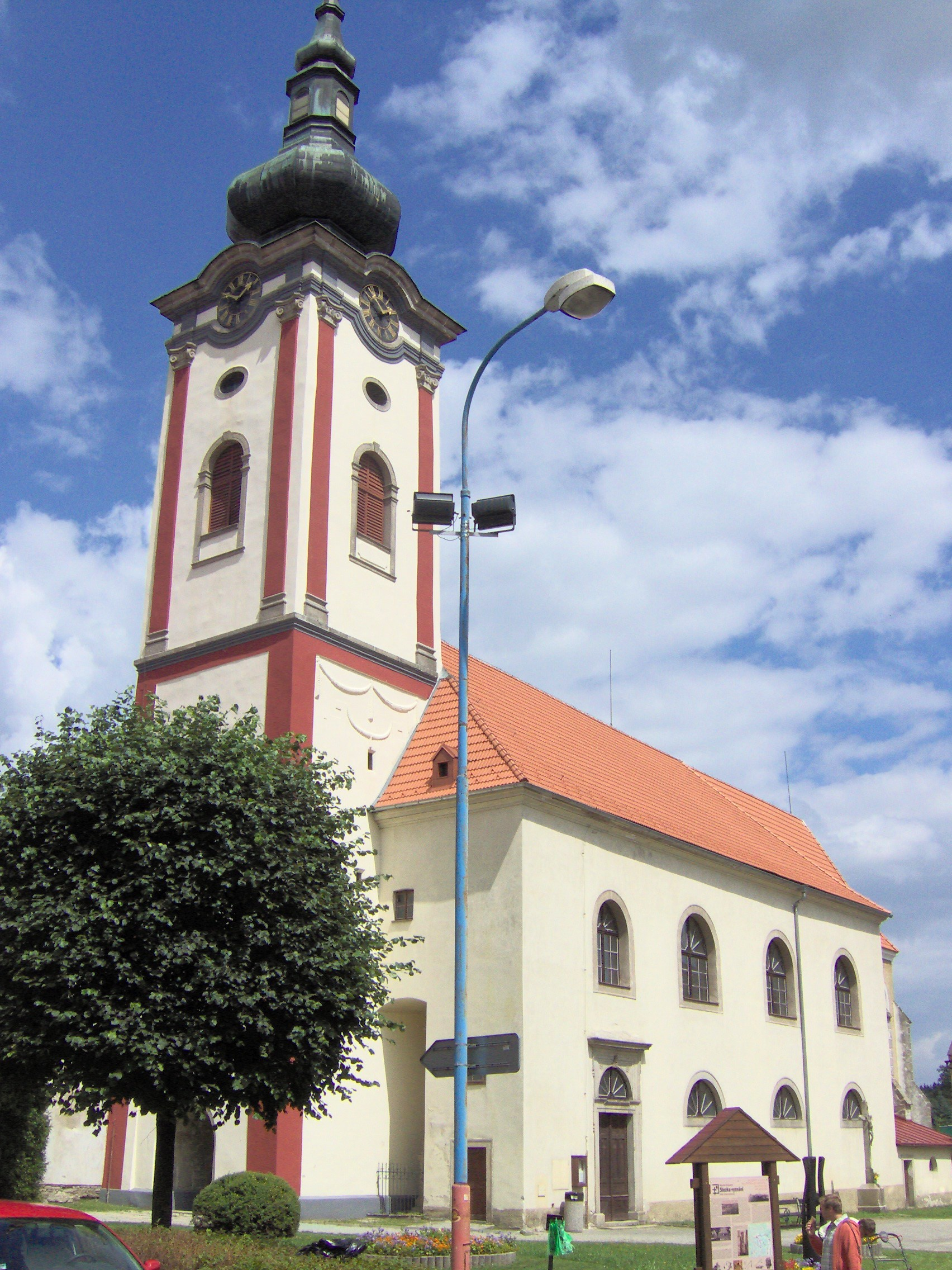
Church of Saints Peter and Paul

The main landmark of Nová Bystřice is Church of Saints Peter and Paul, located on the town square. It was built in the Gothic style around 1335. In the 17th and 18th centuries, it was modofied in the Baroque style.

Nová Bystřice Castle was built on the foundations of a Gothic castle from the 13th century. The eastern wing of today's castle with cellars with barrel vaults and a two-storey Renaissance arcade on the courtyard side have been preserved from the original castle. Today it is privately owned and inaccessible.

The narrow-gauge railway is one of the main tourist attractions. In the railway station is the Regional Narrow Gauge Museum.

Veteran Museum is the largest museum of American pre-war cars in the Czech Republic, but also includes cars from the 1950s and 60s. It consists of more than 70 cars.

== Twin towns – sister cities ==
Nová Bystřice is twinned with:

- Heidenreichstein, Austria
