= Eisgarn =

- Municipality
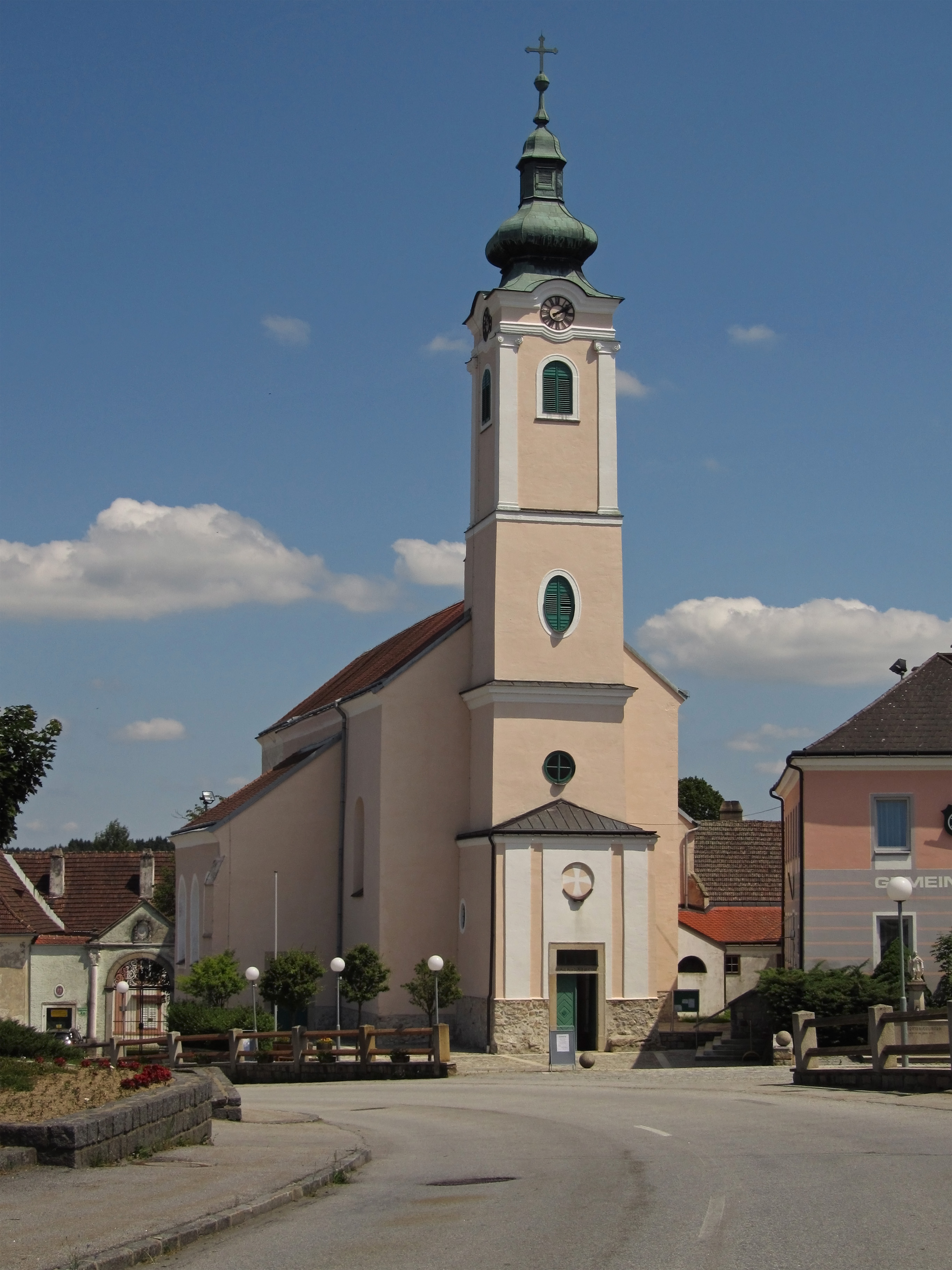
- Eisgarn parish church

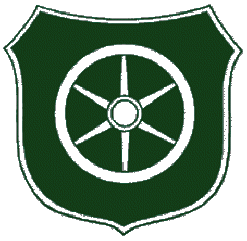
- Coat of arms

- Location within Austria
- Coordinates: 48°55′N 15°6′E
- Country: Austria
- State: Lower Austria
- District: Gmünd

Government
  - Mayor: Günter Schalko

Area
  - Total: 22.5 km^{2} (8.7 sq mi)
- Elevation: 565 m (1,854 ft)

Population (2016-01-01)
  - Total: 684
  - Density: 30.4/km^{2} (78.7/sq mi)
- Time zone: UTC+1 (CET)
  - Summer (DST): UTC+2 (CEST)
- Postal code: 3862
- Area code: 02863
- Website: www.markteisgarn.at

Eisgarn is a municipality in the district of Gmünd in the Austrian state of Lower Austria.

== Geography ==
Eisgarn lies in the northern Waldviertel in Lower Austria 6 km north of Heidenreichstein. About 42.73 percent of the municipality is forested. It borders Dietweis.
