= Hirschbach, Lower Austria =

Hirschbach
- Municipality
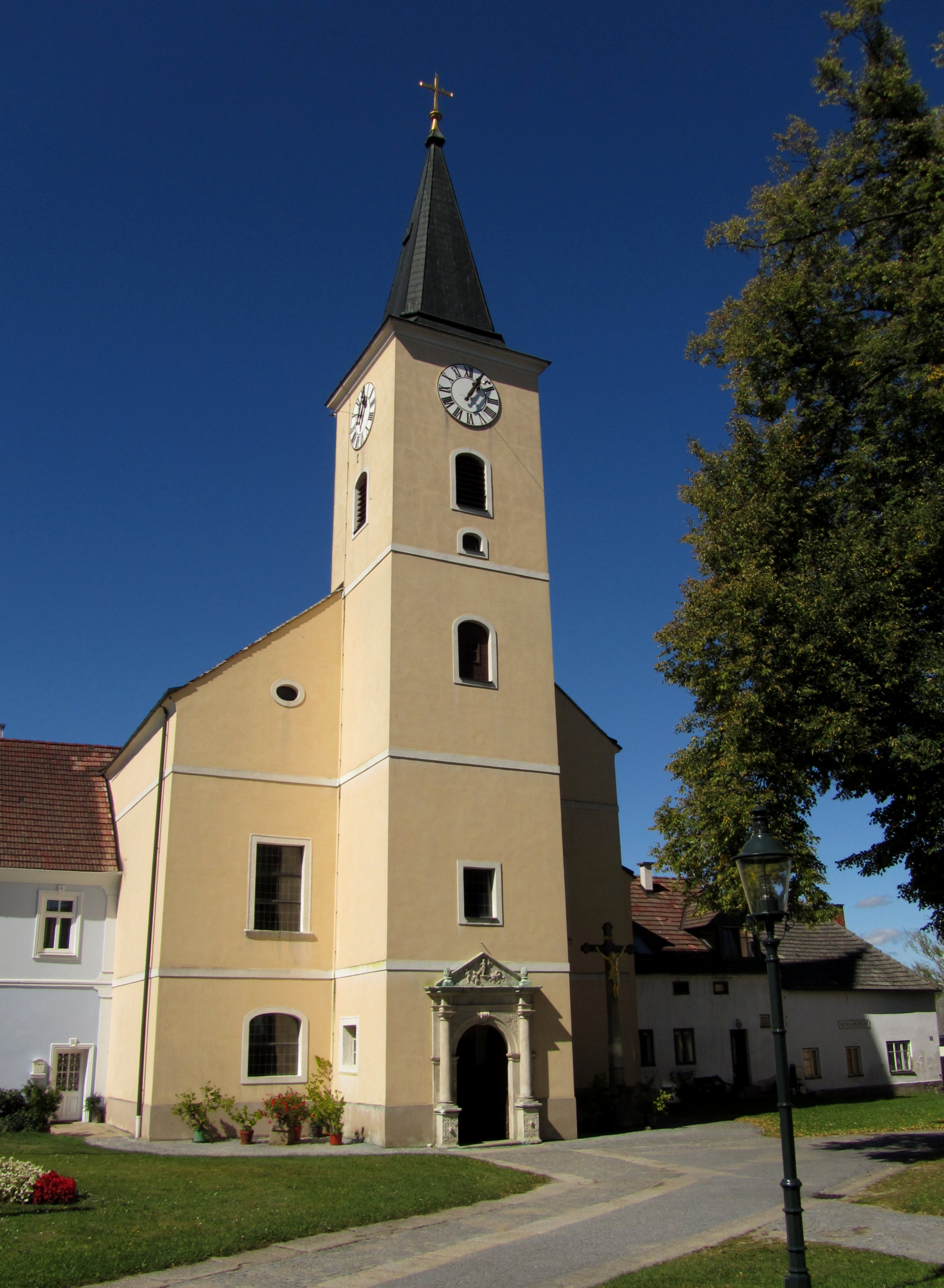
- Hirschbach parish church

- Coat of arms

- Location within Austria
- Coordinates: 48°44′N 15°7′E
- Country: Austria
- State: Lower Austria
- District: Gmünd

Government
  - Mayor: Rainald Schäfer (SPÖ)

Area
  - Total: 7.9 km^{2} (3.1 sq mi)
- Elevation: 569 m (1,867 ft)

Population (2018-01-01)
  - Total: 581
  - Density: 74/km^{2} (190/sq mi)
- Time zone: UTC+1 (CET)
  - Summer (DST): UTC+2 (CEST)
- Postal code: 3942
- Area code: 02854
- Website: www.hirschbach.gv.at

Hirschbach (Austrian German pronunciation: [ˈhɪrʃbax]) is a town in the district of Gmünd in Lower Austria, Austria.

== Geography ==
Hirschbach lies on the Moosbach in the upper Waldviertel, about 15 km east of Gmünd. About 55.66 percent of the municipality is forested.
