= Blockheide =

Protected area in Austria

Coordinates: 48°46′47″N 14°59′45″E

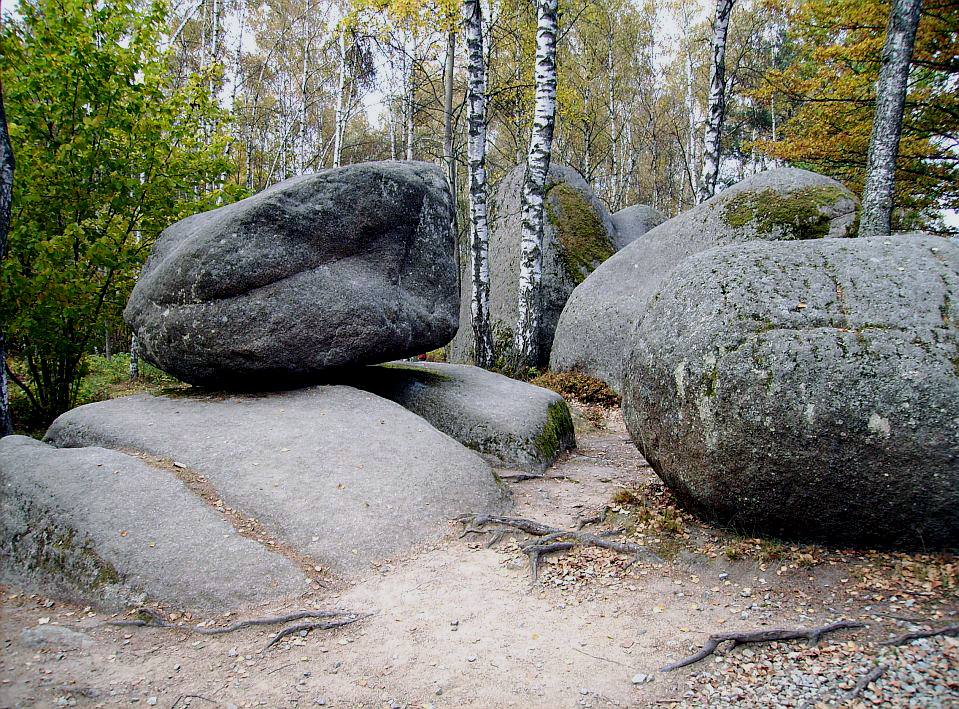
Rocking stone in Blockheide

The Blockheide is an exposed outcrop and protected area near Gmünd in northwestern Waldviertel in the Austrian state of Lower Austria.

It is known for large, exposed granite blocks, among them some Rocking stones.

The Blockheide-Eibenstein Nature Park (German: Naturpark Blockheide-Eibenstein) is the associated nature park. It has a varied heather landscape including meadows, mixed woods including Scots pines, small lakes and small fields.
