= Loimanns =

- Village
- Location within Austria
- Coordinates: 48°56′05″N 15°04′10″E
- Country: Austria
- State: Lower Austria
- District: Gmünd
- Municipality: Litschau

Area
  - Total: 5.45 km^{2} (2.10 sq mi)
- Elevation: 605 m (1,985 ft)
- Time zone: UTC+1 (CET)
  - Summer (DST): UTC+2 (CEST)
- Postal code: 3874
- Area code: 02865
- Website: www.litschau.at

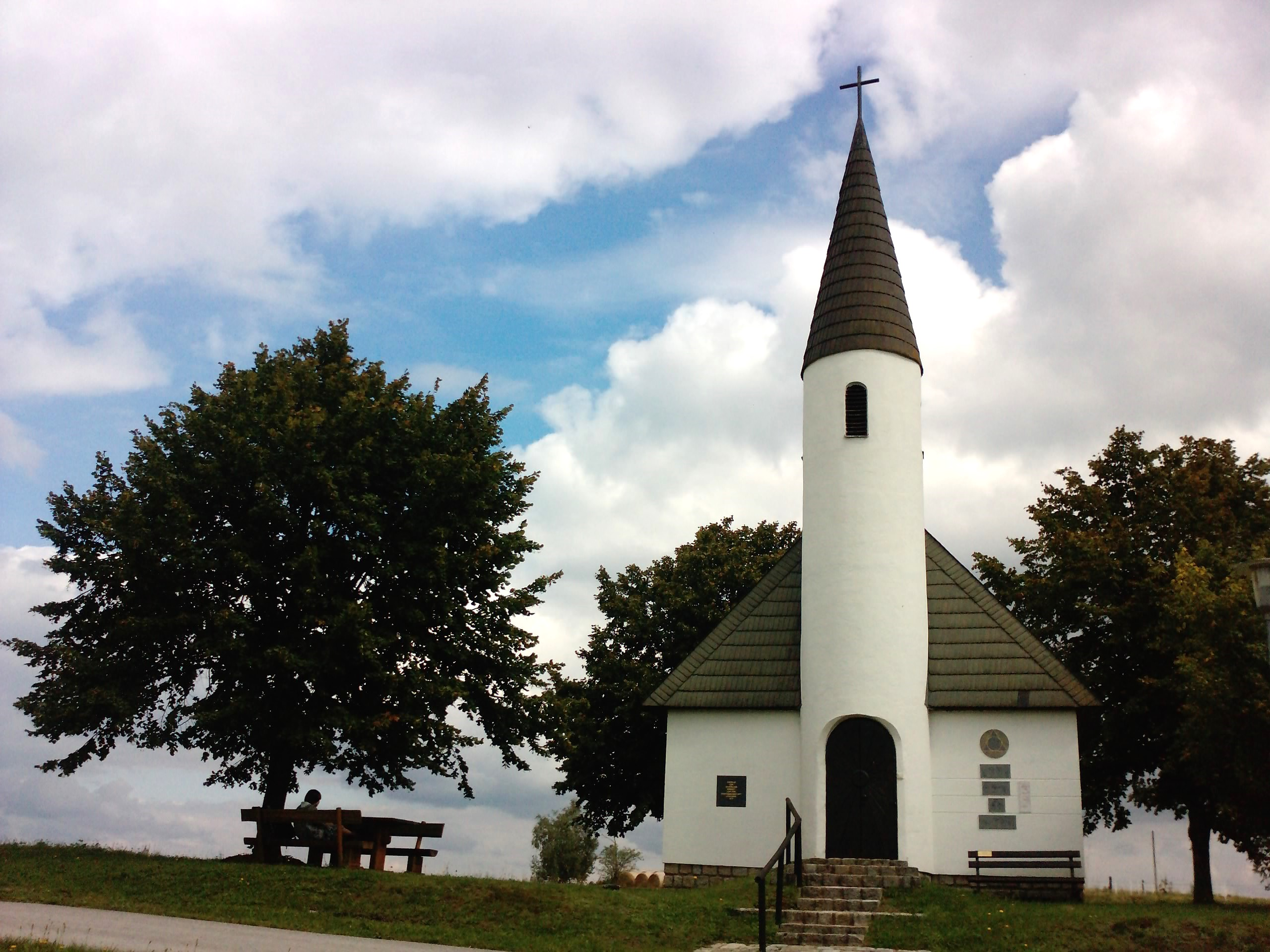
Chapel for the deaf in Loimanns, built in 1979

Loimanns is a village and a cadastral municipality of Litschau, a town in the district of Gmünd in Lower Austria, Austria.

== Housing development ==
At the turn of 1979/1980 there was a total of 95 building plots with 32.143 m^{2} and 48 gardens with 8.753 m^{2}, 1989/1990 there were 120 buildings plots. At the turn of 1999/2000, the number of buildings plots had increased to 341 and at the turn of 2009/2010 there were 148 buildings on 327 building plots.
