= Eggern =

- Municipality
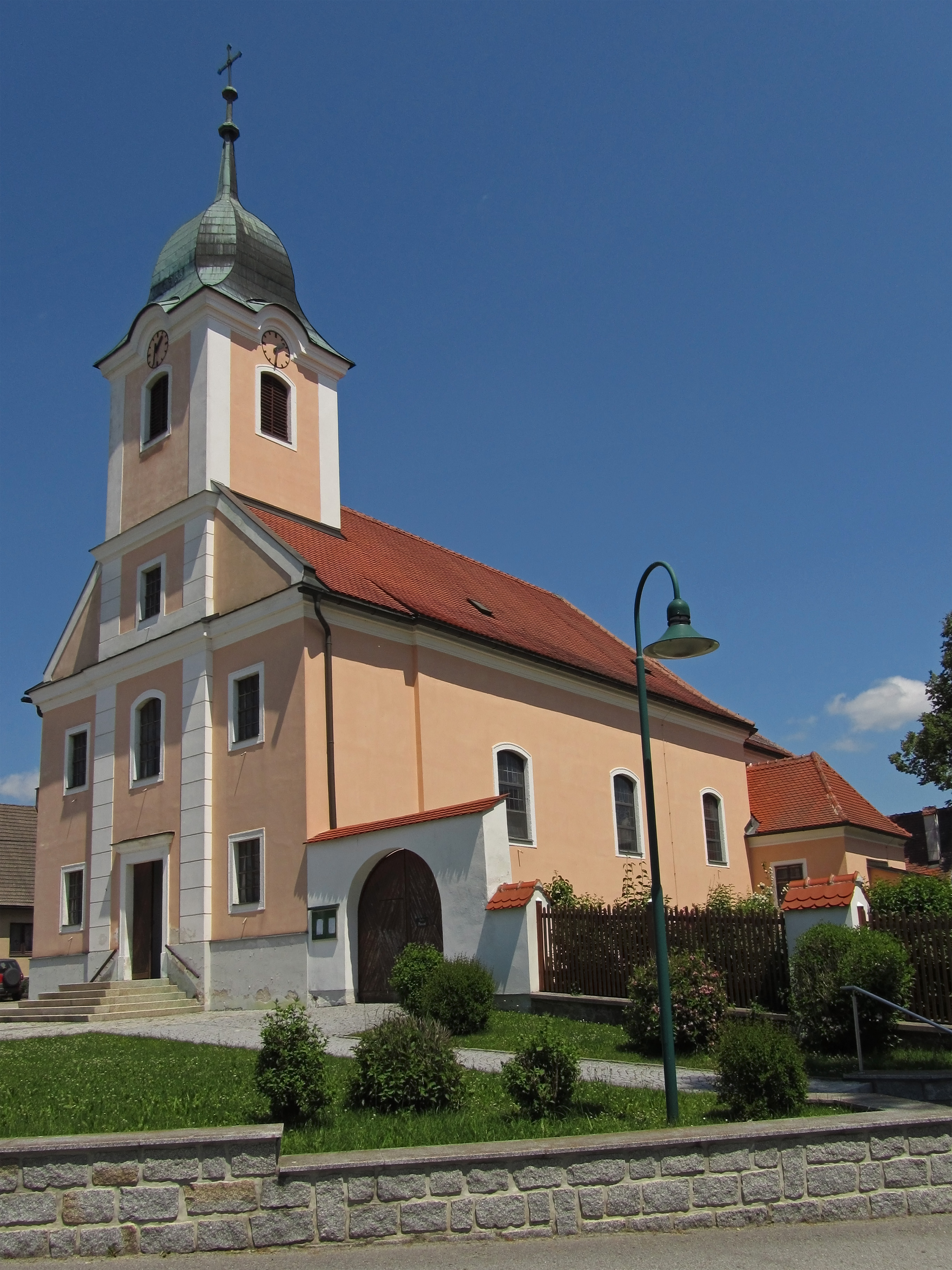
- Eggern parish church

- Coat of arms

- Location within Austria
- Coordinates: 48°54′N 15°8′E
- Country: Austria
- State: Lower Austria
- District: Gmünd

Government
  - Mayor: Herbert Zimmermann

Area
  - Total: 20.21 km^{2} (7.80 sq mi)
- Elevation: 578 m (1,896 ft)

Population (2018-01-01)
  - Total: 688
  - Density: 34.0/km^{2} (88.2/sq mi)
- Time zone: UTC+1 (CET)
  - Summer (DST): UTC+2 (CEST)
- Postal code: 3861
- Area code: 02863
- Website: www.eggern.gv.at

Eggern is a town in the district of Gmünd in the Austrian state of Lower Austria.

== Geography ==
Eggern lies in the northern Waldviertel in Lower Austria. About 36.77 percent of the municipality is forested. It borders Dietweis.
