= Reitzenschlag =

- Village
- Location within Austria
- Coordinates: 48°56′48″N 15°5′0″E
- Country: Austria
- State: Lower Austria
- District: Gmünd
- Municipality: Litschau

Area
  - Total: 6.53 km^{2} (2.52 sq mi)
- Elevation: 590 m (1,940 ft)
- Time zone: UTC+1 (CET)
  - Summer (DST): UTC+2 (CEST)
- Postal code: 3874
- Area code: 02865
- Website: www.litschau.at

Reitzenschlag is a village and a cadastral municipality of Litschau, a town in the district of Gmünd in Lower Austria, Austria.

== Housing Development ==
At the turn of 1979/1980 there was a total of 68 building plots with 30,333 m^{2} and 38 gardens with 22,373 m^{2}, 1989/1990 there were 104 buildings plots. At the turn of 1999/2000, the number of buildings plots had increased to 251 and at the turn of 2009/2010 there were 113 buildings on 240 building plots.
