= Amaliendorf-Aalfang =

- Municipality
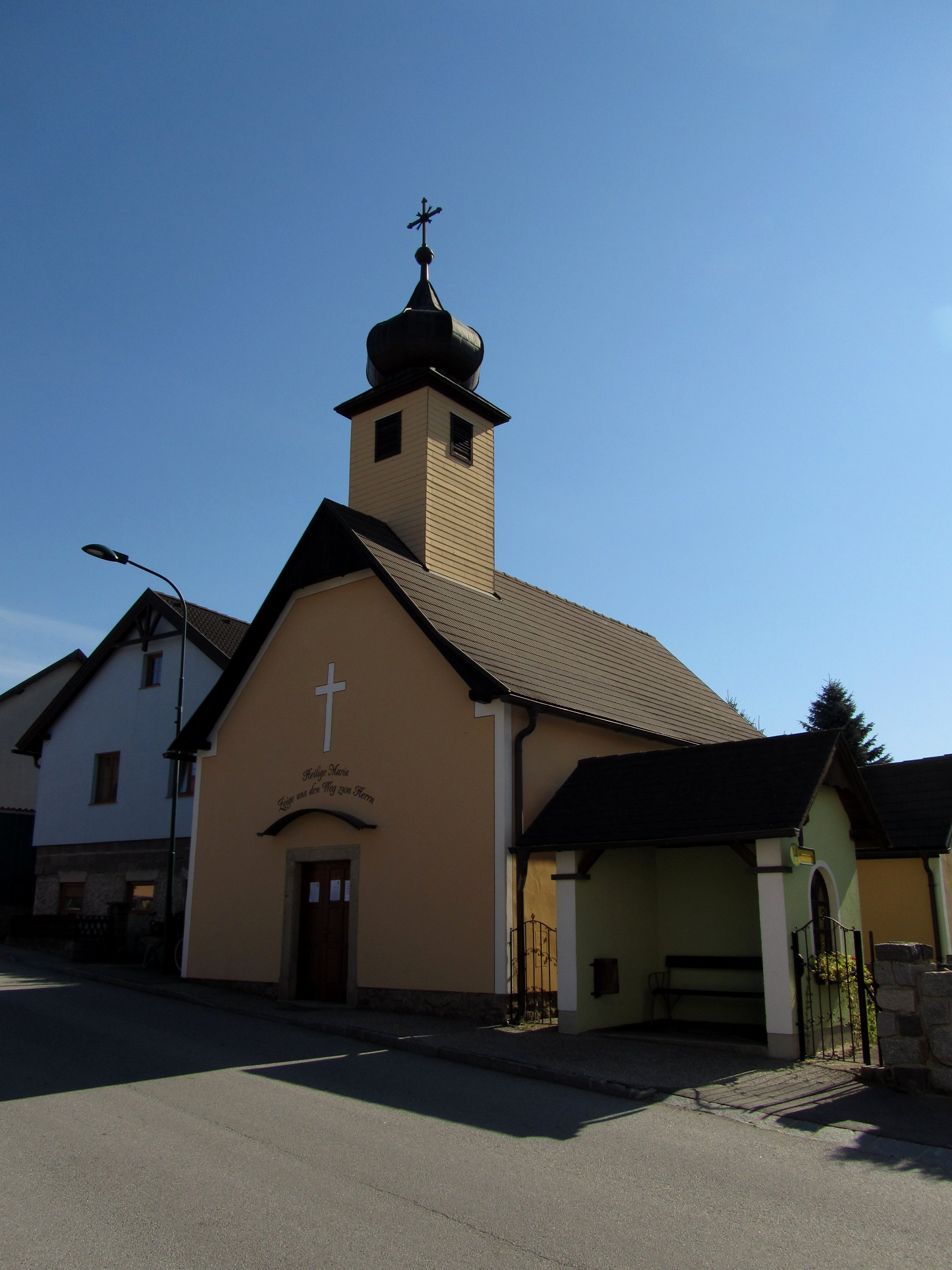
- Amaliendorf chapel

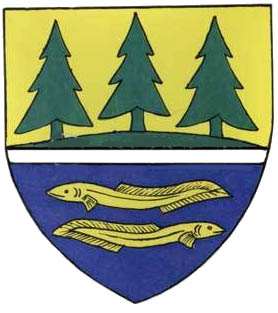
- Coat of arms

- Location within Austria
- Coordinates: 48°50′N 15°5′E
- Country: Austria
- State: Lower Austria
- District: Gmünd

Government
  - Mayor: Karl Prohaska

Area
  - Total: 8.04 km^{2} (3.10 sq mi)
- Elevation: 568 m (1,864 ft)

Population (2018-01-01)
  - Total: 1,102
  - Density: 137/km^{2} (355/sq mi)
- Time zone: UTC+1 (CET)
  - Summer (DST): UTC+2 (CEST)
- Postal code: 3872
- Area code: 02862
- Website: www.amaliendorf.at

Amaliendorf-Aalfang is a town in the district of Gmünd in the Austrian state of Lower Austria.

== Geography ==
Amaliendorf-Aalfang lies in the Waldviertel in Lower Austria. Only about 41.38 percent of the municipality is forested.
