= Hirschbach =

Hirschbach may refer to:

- Hirschbach, Lower Austria, a municipality in Lower Austria, Austria
- Hirschbach im Mühlkreis, a municipality in Upper Austria, Austria
- Hirschbach, Bavaria, a municipality in Bavaria, Germany
- Hirschbach (Gersprenz), a river in Hesse, Germany

== People with the surname ==
- Wolfgang Hirschbach (1570–1620), German legal scholar
