= Großschönau =

Großschönau or Groß Schönau may refer to:

- Großschönau, Saxony, a municipality in Germany
- Großschönau, Waldviertel, a municipality in Austria
- Velký Šenov (Groß Schönau), a town in the Czech Republic
