= Gmünd District =

Coordinates: 48.7667°N 14.9833°E

Gmünd District Bezirk Gmünd
- District
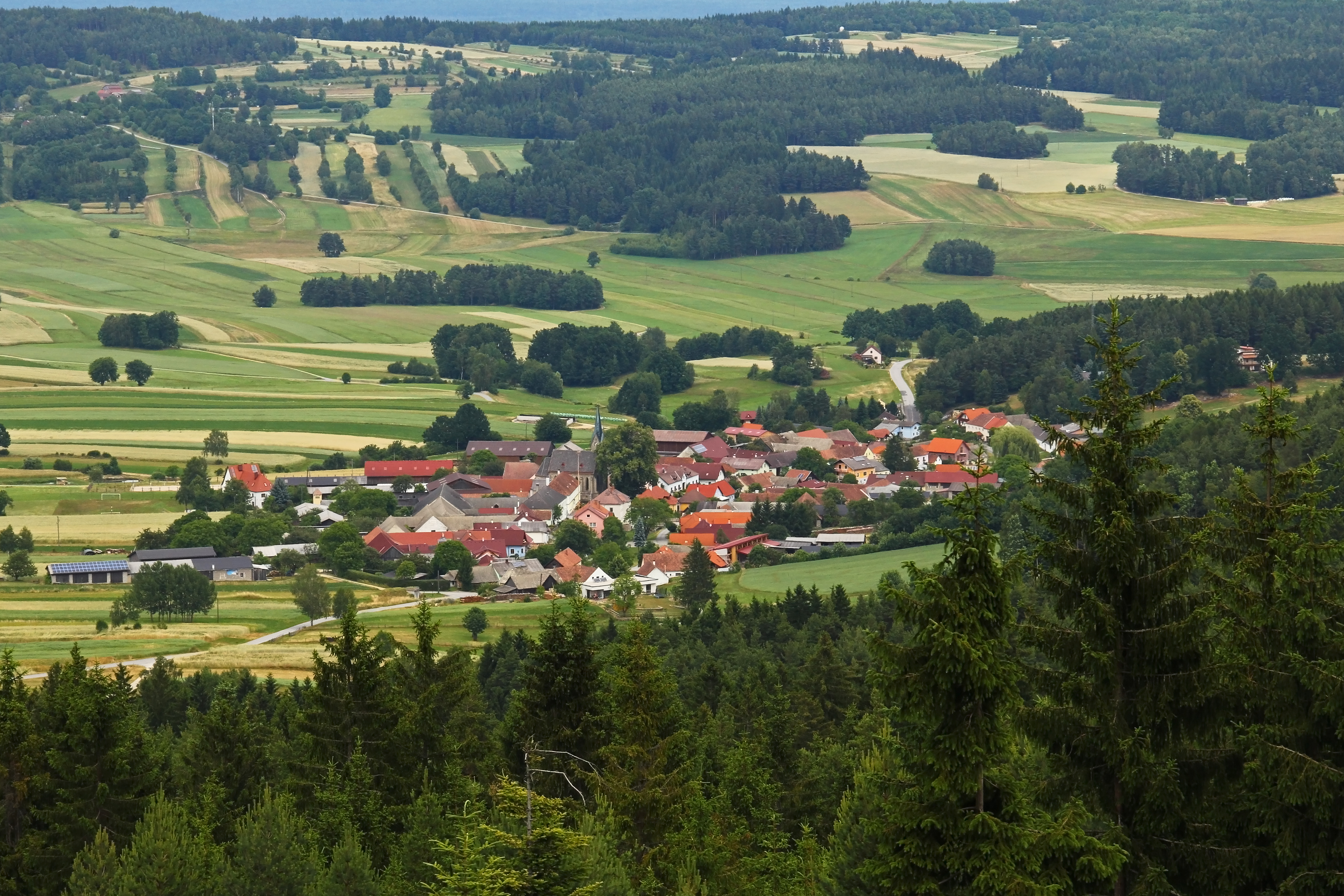
- View of Heinrichs bei Weitra
- Country: Austria
- State: Lower Austria
- Number of municipalities: 21
- Administrative seat: Gmünd

Government
  - District Governor: Renate Giller-Schilk (since 2025)

Area
  - Total: 786.2 km^{2} (303.6 sq mi)

Population (2024)
  - Total: 35,939
  - Density: 45.71/km^{2} (118.4/sq mi)
- Time zone: UTC+01:00 (CET)
  - Summer (DST): UTC+02:00 (CEST)
- Vehicle registration: GD
- NUTS code: AT124
- District code: 309

Bezirk Gmünd is a district of the state of Lower Austria in Austria. It is located in northwestern Waldviertel.

== Municipalities ==
Towns (Städte) are indicated in boldface; market towns (Marktgemeinden) in italics; suburbs, hamlets and other subdivisions of a municipality are indicated in small characters.

- Amaliendorf-Aalfang
  - Aalfang, Amaliendorf, Falkendorf
- Bad Großpertholz
  - Abschlag, Angelbach, Bad Großpertholz, Hirschenstein, Karlstift, Mühlbach, Reichenau am Freiwald, Scheiben, Seifritz, Steinbach, Watzmanns, Weikertschlag
- Brand-Nagelberg
  - Alt-Nagelberg, Brand, Finsternau, Neu-Nagelberg, Steinbach
- Eggern
  - Eggern, Reinberg-Heidenreichstein, Reinberg-Litschau
- Eisgarn
  - Eisgarn, Groß-Radischen, Klein-Radischen, Wielings
- Gmünd
  - Breitensee, Eibenstein, Gmünd, Grillenstein
- Großdietmanns
  - Dietmanns, Ehrendorf, Eichberg, Höhenberg, Hörmanns bei Weitra, Reinpolz, Unterlembach, Wielands
- Großschönau
  - Engelstein, Friedreichs, Großotten, Großschönau, Harmannstein, Hirschenhof, Mistelbach, Rothfarn, Schroffen, Thaures, Wachtberg, Wörnharts, Zweres
- Haugschlag
  - Griesbach, Haugschlag, Rottal, Türnau
- Heidenreichstein
  - Altmanns, Dietweis, Eberweis, Guttenbrunn, Haslau, Heidenreichstein, Kleinpertholz, Motten, Seyfrieds, Thaures, Wielandsberg, Wolfsegg
- Hirschbach
  - Hirschbach, Stölzles
- Hoheneich
  - Hoheneich, Nondorf
- Kirchberg am Walde
  - Fromberg, Hollenstein, Kirchberg am Walde, Süßenbach, Ullrichs, Weißenalbern
- Litschau
  - Gopprechts, Hörmanns bei Litschau, Josefsthal, Litschau, Loimanns, Reichenbach, Reitzenschlag, Saaß, Schandachen, Schlag, Schönau bei Litschau
- Moorbad Harbach
  - Harbach, Hirschenwies, Lauterbach, Maißen, Schwarzau, Wultschau
- Reingers
  - Grametten, Hirschenschlag, Illmanns, Leopoldsdorf, Reingers
- Schrems
  - Anderlfabrik, Ehrenhöbarten, Gebharts, Kiensaß, Kleedorf, Kottinghörmanns, Kurzschwarza, Langegg, Langschwarza, Neulangegg, Neuniederschrems, Niederschrems, Pürbach, Schrems
- Sankt Martin
  - Anger, Breitenberg, Harmanschlag, Joachimstal, Langfeld, Maißen, Oberlainsitz, Reitgraben, Rörndlwies, Roßbruck, Schöllbüchl, Schützenberg, St. Martin, Zeil
- Unserfrau-Altweitra
  - Altweitra, Heinrichs bei Weitra, Ober-Lembach, Pyhrabruck, Schagges, Ulrichs, Unserfrau
- Waldenstein
  - Albrechts, Groß-Höbarten, Groß-Neusiedl, Grünbach, Klein-Ruprechts, Waldenstein, Zehenthöf
- Weitra
  - Großwolfgers, Oberbrühl, Oberwindhag, Reinprechts, Spital, St. Wolfgang, Sulz, Tiefenbach, Unterbrühl, Walterschlag, Weitra, Wetzles
