= Brand-Nagelberg =

- Municipality
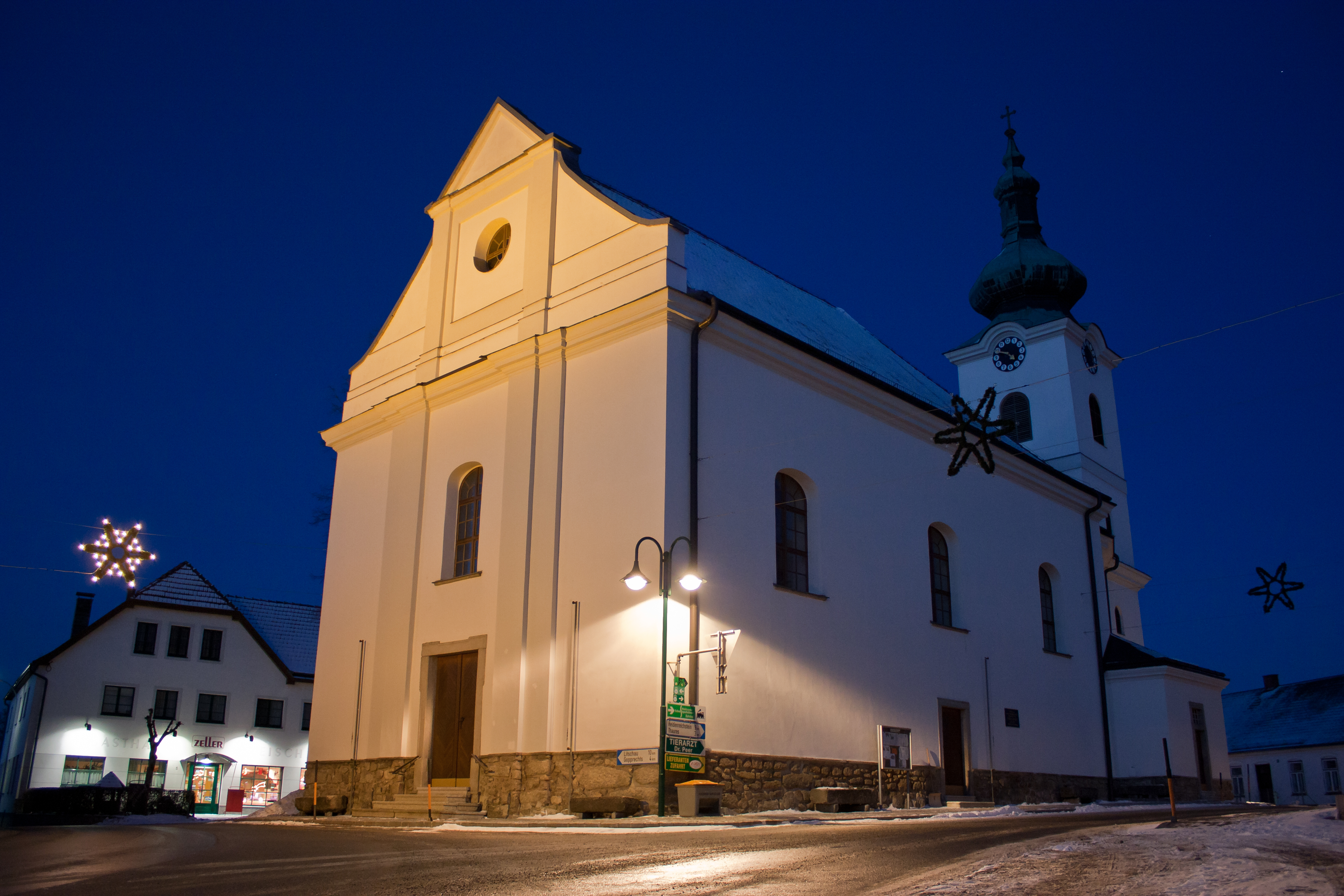
- Church in Brand

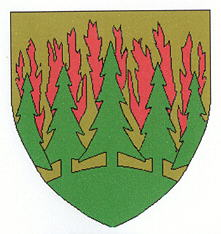
- Coat of arms

- Location within Austria
- Coordinates: 48°50′N 14°59′E
- Country: Austria
- State: Lower Austria
- District: Gmünd

Government
  - Mayor: Franz Freisehner

Area
  - Total: 36.64 km^{2} (14.15 sq mi)
- Elevation: 508 m (1,667 ft)

Population (2018-01-01)
  - Total: 1,546
  - Density: 42.19/km^{2} (109.3/sq mi)
- Time zone: UTC+1 (CET)
  - Summer (DST): UTC+2 (CEST)
- Postal code: 3871
- Area code: 02859
- Website: www.brand-nagelberg.at

Brand-Nagelberg is a town in the district of Gmünd in the Austrian state of Lower Austria.

== Geography ==
Brand-Nagelberg lies in the Waldviertel in Lower Austria. About 68.22 percent of the municipality is forested.
