= Großschönau, Waldviertel =

Großschönau
- Municipality
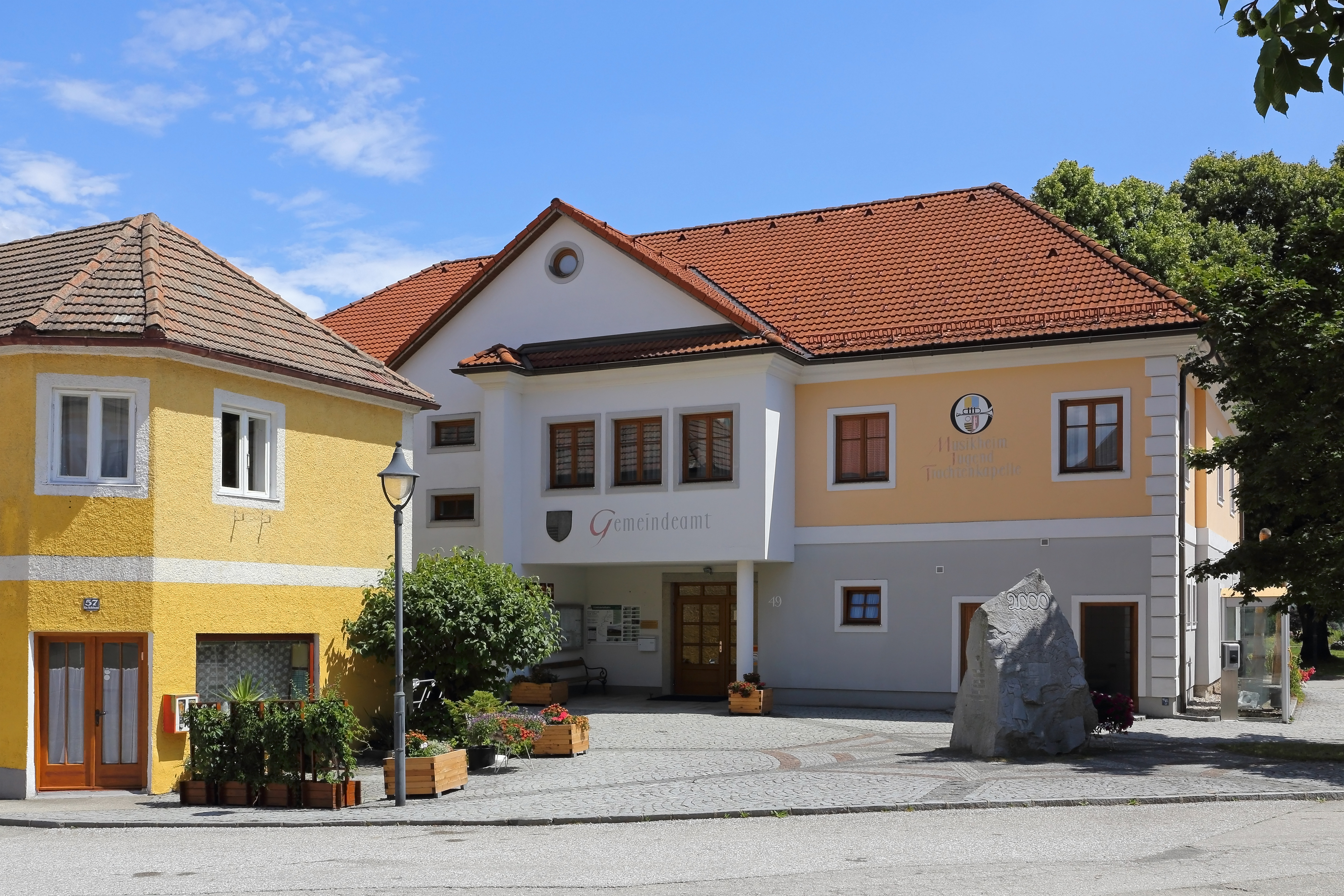
- Municipal office

- Coat of arms

- Location within Austria
- Coordinates: 48°39′N 14°56′E
- Country: Austria
- State: Lower Austria
- District: Gmünd

Government
  - Mayor: Martin Bruckner (ÖVP)

Area
  - Total: 41.97 km^{2} (16.20 sq mi)
- Elevation: 681 m (2,234 ft)

Population (2018-01-01)
  - Total: 1,211
  - Density: 28.85/km^{2} (74.73/sq mi)
- Time zone: UTC+1 (CET)
  - Summer (DST): UTC+2 (CEST)
- Postal code: 3922
- Area code: 02815
- Website: www.grossschoenau.gv.at

Großschönau is a town in the district of Gmünd in the Austrian state of Lower Austria. It is the home of the Sonnenwelt children's science park.

== Geography ==
Großschönau lies in the western Waldviertel in Lower Austria. About 37.01 percent of the municipality is forested.
