= Waldenstein =

- Municipality
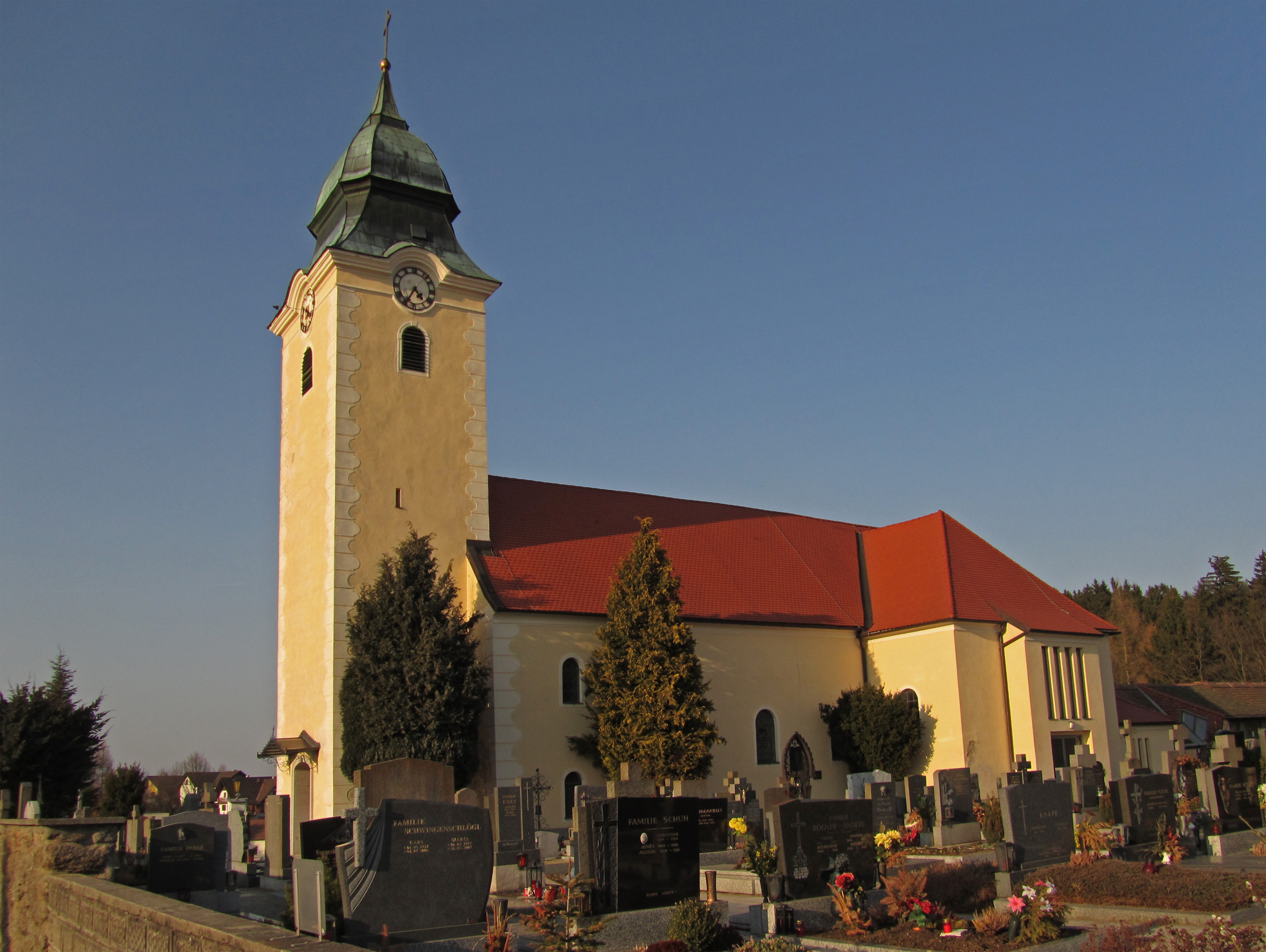
- Church of Saint Michael

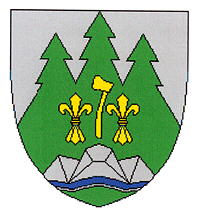
- Coat of arms

- Location within Austria
- Coordinates: 48°44′N 15°1′E
- Country: Austria
- State: Lower Austria
- District: Gmünd

Government
  - Mayor: Christian Dogl (ÖVP)

Area
  - Total: 22.74 km^{2} (8.78 sq mi)
- Elevation: 575 m (1,886 ft)

Population (2018-01-01)
  - Total: 1,195
  - Density: 52.55/km^{2} (136.1/sq mi)
- Time zone: UTC+1 (CET)
  - Summer (DST): UTC+2 (CEST)
- Postal code: 3961
- Area code: 02855
- Website: www.waldenstein.at

Waldenstein is a town in the district of Gmünd in Lower Austria, Austria.

== Geography ==
Waldenstein has an area of 22.73 km². It is located in the northeast of the country, not far from the border with the Czech Republic.
