= Unserfrau-Altweitra =

Place in Lower Austria, Austria

- Municipality
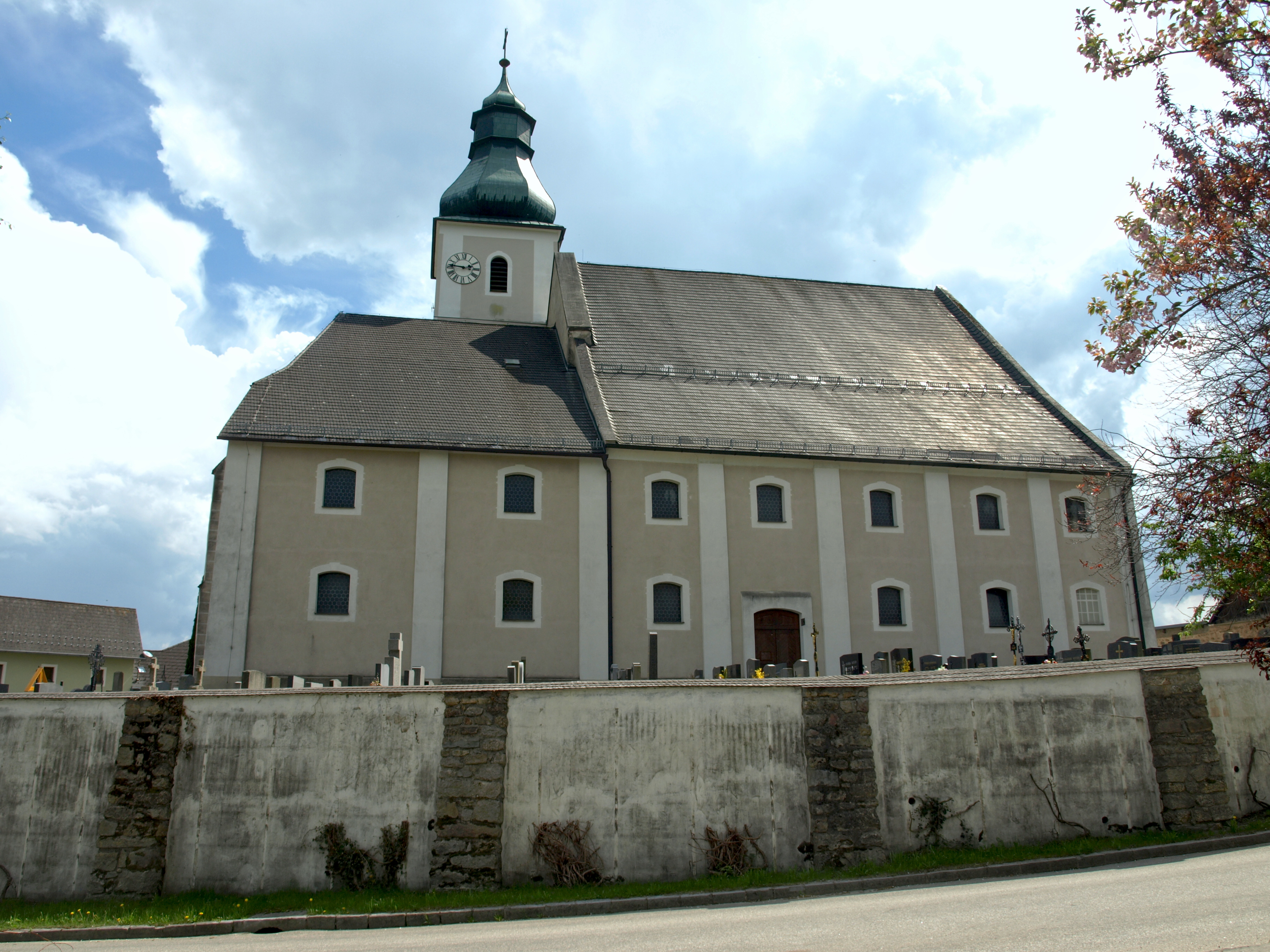
- Church of the Nativity of the Virgin Mary

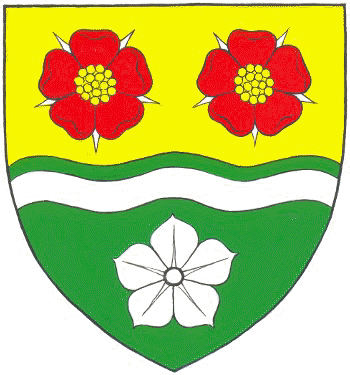
- Coat of arms

- Location within Austria
- Coordinates: 48°45′N 14°54′E
- Country: Austria
- State: Lower Austria
- District: Gmünd

Government
  - Mayor: Othmar Kowar (ÖVP)

Area
  - Total: 40.2 km^{2} (15.5 sq mi)
- Elevation: 214 m (702 ft)

Population (2018-01-01)
  - Total: 1,004
  - Density: 25.0/km^{2} (64.7/sq mi)
- Time zone: UTC+1 (CET)
  - Summer (DST): UTC+2 (CEST)
- Postal code: 3970
- Area code: 02856

Unserfrau-Altweitra is a town in the district of Gmünd in Lower Austria, Austria.
