= St. Martin, Lower Austria =

Sankt Martin
- Municipality
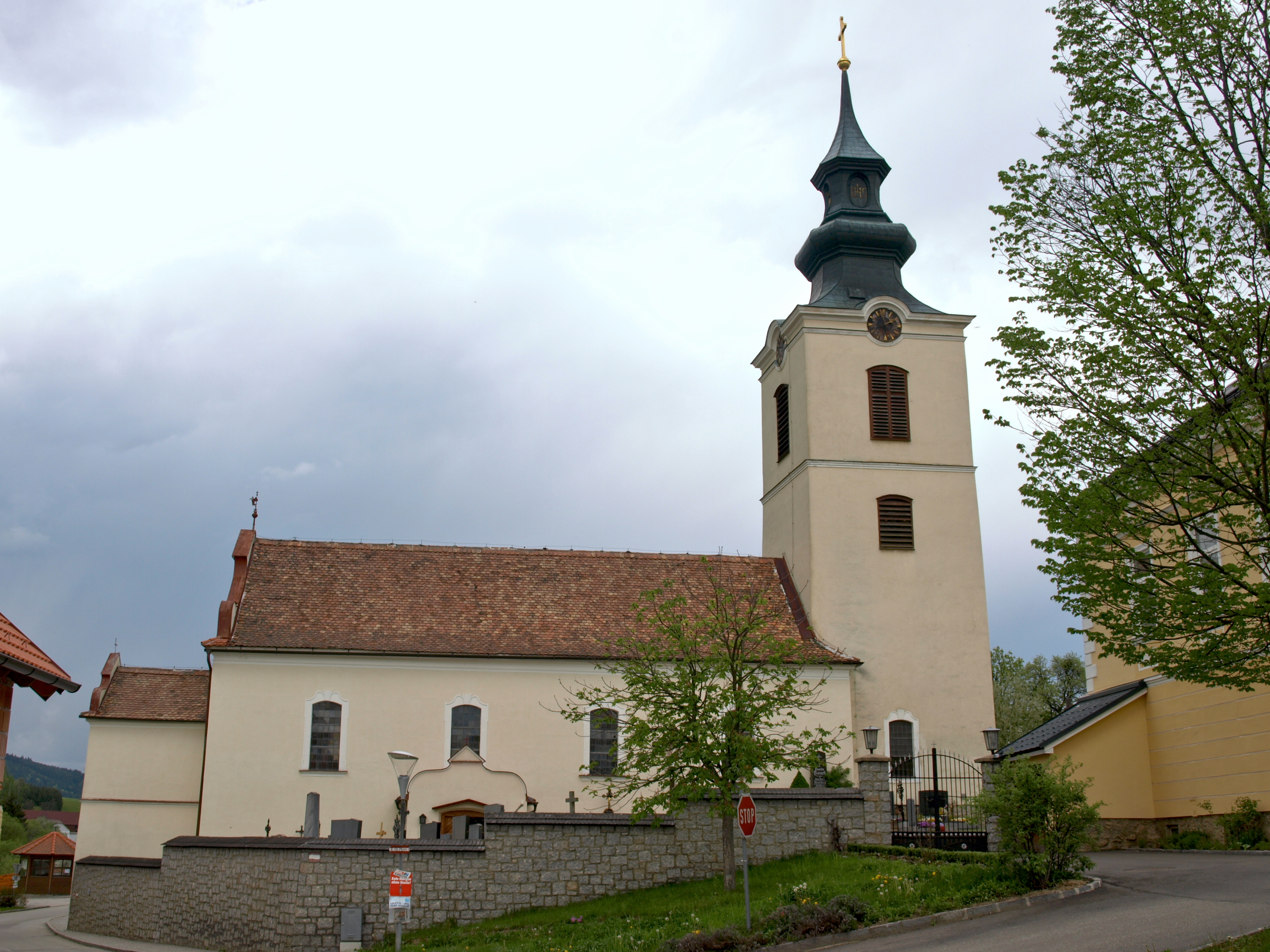
- Church of Saint Martin

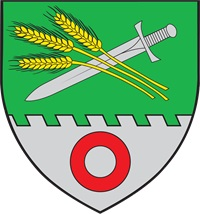
- Coat of arms

- Location within Austria
- Coordinates: 48°39′N 14°50′E
- Country: Austria
- State: Lower Austria
- District: Gmünd

Government
  - Mayor: Peter Höbarth (ÖVP)

Area
  - Total: 49.33 km^{2} (19.05 sq mi)
- Elevation: 621 m (2,037 ft)

Population (2018-01-01)
  - Total: 1,124
  - Density: 22.79/km^{2} (59.01/sq mi)
- Time zone: UTC+1 (CET)
  - Summer (DST): UTC+2 (CEST)
- Postal code: 3971
- Area code: 02857
- Website: https://www.st-martin.eu/

Sankt Martin (Austrian German pronunciation: [saŋkt ˈmartiːn]) is a market town in the district of Gmünd in Lower Austria, Austria.
