= Großdietmanns =

- Municipality
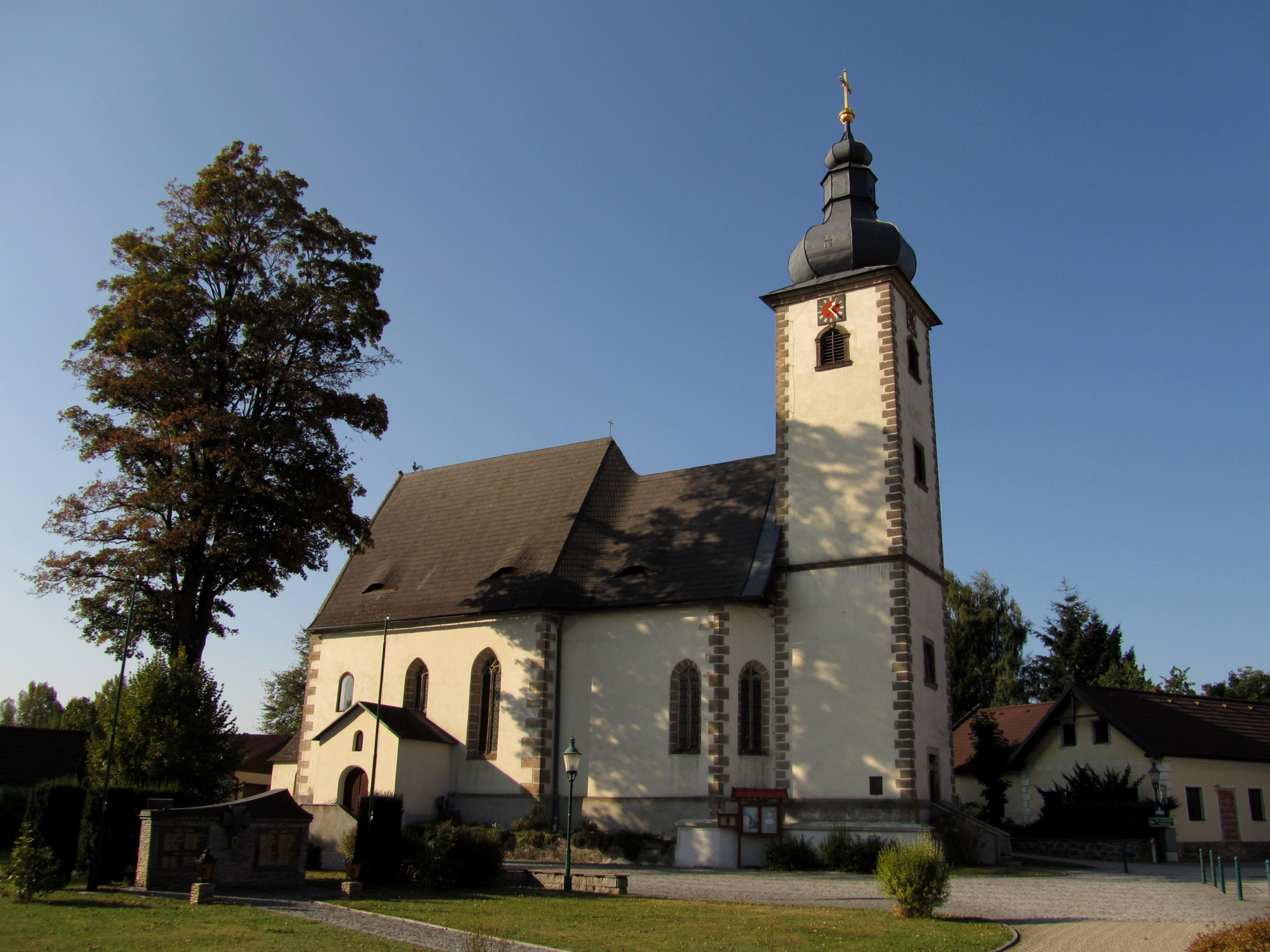
- Großdietmanns parish church

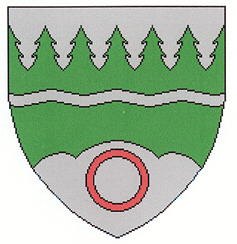
- Coat of arms

- Location within Austria
- Coordinates: 48°28′N 15°9′E
- Country: Austria
- State: Lower Austria
- District: Gmünd

Government
  - Mayor: Johann Weissenbök

Area
  - Total: 39.97 km^{2} (15.43 sq mi)
- Elevation: 497 m (1,631 ft)

Population (2018-01-01)
  - Total: 2,215
  - Density: 55.42/km^{2} (143.5/sq mi)
- Time zone: UTC+1 (CET)
  - Summer (DST): UTC+2 (CEST)
- Postal code: 3950
- Area code: 02852
- Website: www.grossdietmanns.gv.at

Großdietmanns is a town in the district of Gmünd in the Austrian state of Lower Austria.

== Geography ==
Großdietmanns lies in the valley of the Lainsitz in the Waldviertel in Lower Austria. About 25.6 percent of the municipality is forested.
