= Haugschlag =

- Municipality
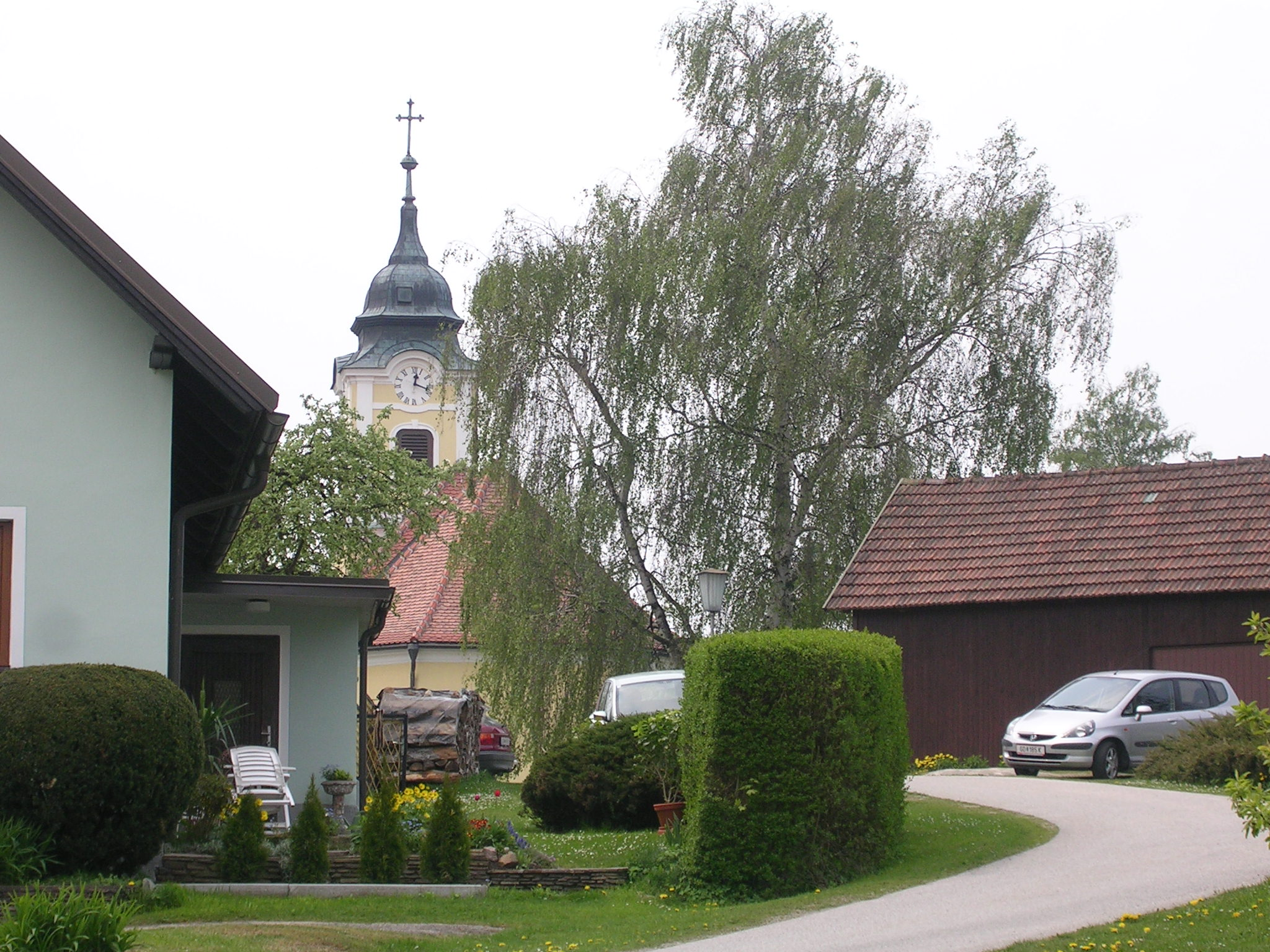
- Haugschlag parish church

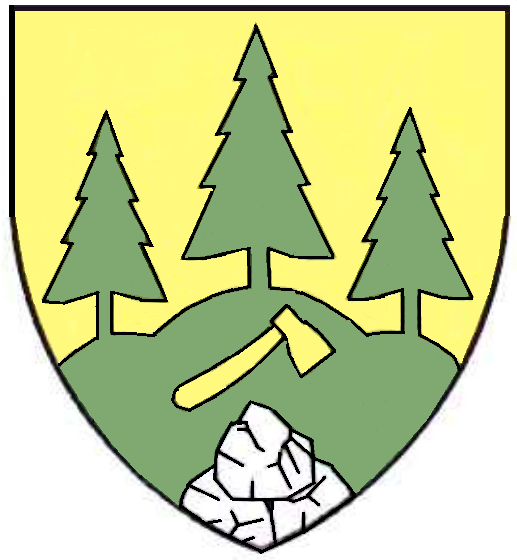
- Coat of arms

- Location within Austria
- Coordinates: 48°59′N 15°3′E
- Country: Austria
- State: Lower Austria
- District: Gmünd

Government
  - Mayor: Adolf Kainz

Area
  - Total: 22.65 km^{2} (8.75 sq mi)
- Elevation: 585 m (1,919 ft)

Population (2016-01-01)
  - Total: 485
  - Density: 21.4/km^{2} (55.5/sq mi)
- Time zone: UTC+1 (CET)
  - Summer (DST): UTC+2 (CEST)
- Postal code: 3874
- Area code: 02865
- Website: www.haugschlag.at

Haugschlag is a municipality in the district of Gmünd in the Austrian state of Lower Austria.

== Geography ==
It is Austria's northernmost municipality, located in the Waldviertel region close to the Czech border. It comprises the Katastralgemeinden of Griesbach, Haugschlag, Rottal, and Türnau.
