= Reingers =

- Municipality
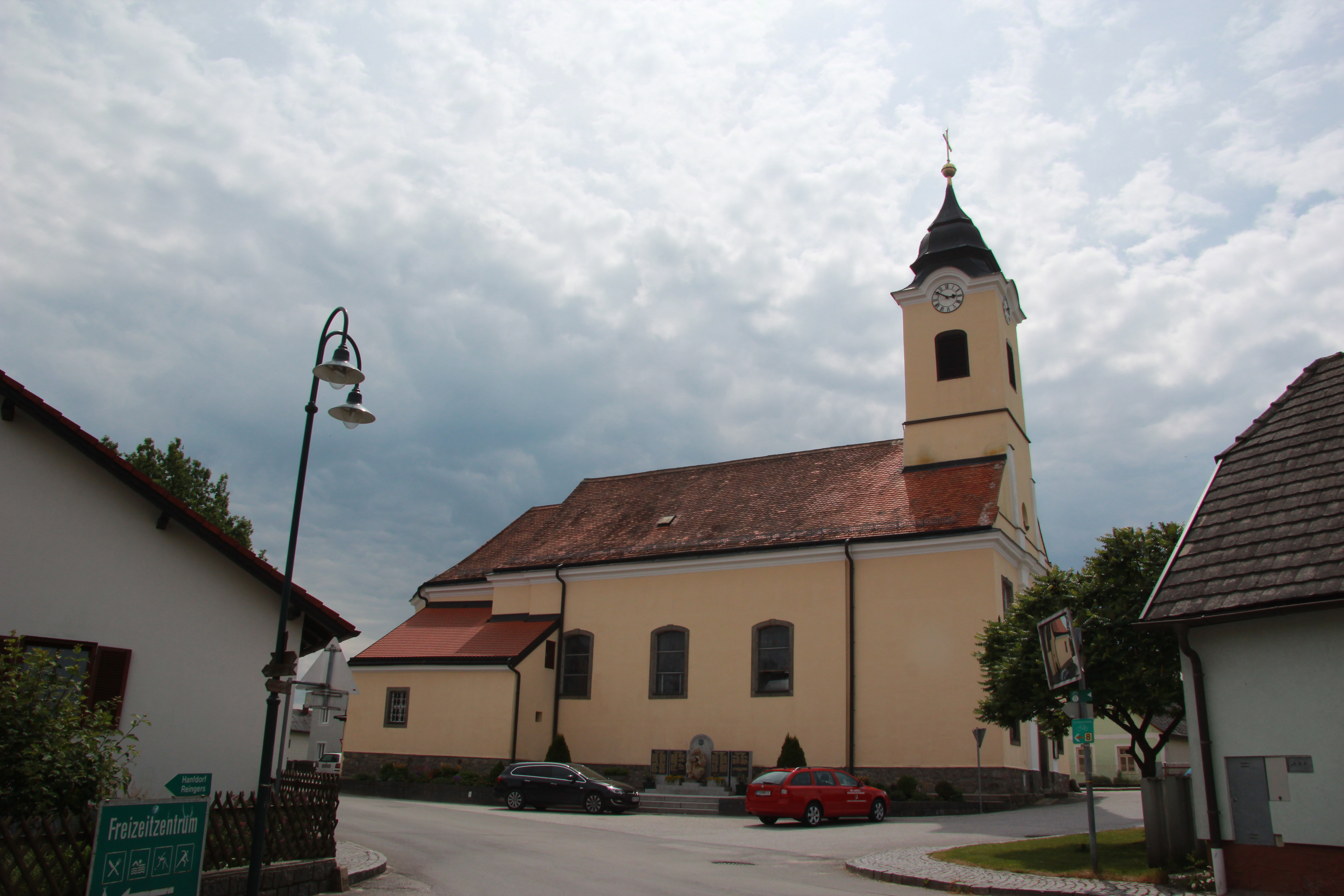
- Reingers parish church

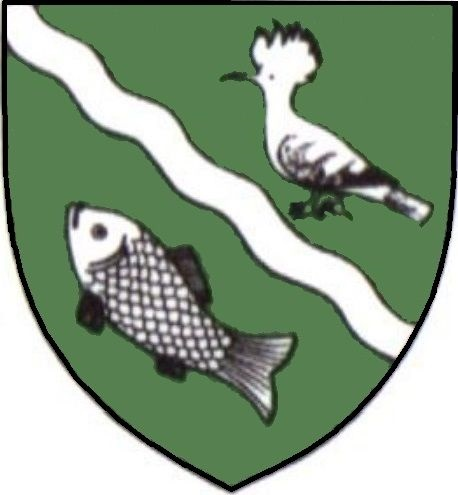
- Coat of arms

- Location within Austria
- Coordinates: 48°58′N 15°8′E
- Country: Austria
- State: Lower Austria
- District: Gmünd

Government
  - Mayor: Andreas Kozar

Area
  - Total: 24.92 km^{2} (9.62 sq mi)
- Elevation: 719 m (2,359 ft)

Population (2018-01-01)
  - Total: 635
  - Density: 25.5/km^{2} (66.0/sq mi)
- Time zone: UTC+1 (CET)
  - Summer (DST): UTC+2 (CEST)
- Postal code: 3863
- Area code: 02863
- Website: www.reingers.gv.at

Reingers is a town in the district of Gmünd in Lower Austria, Austria.
