= Hoheneich =

- Municipality
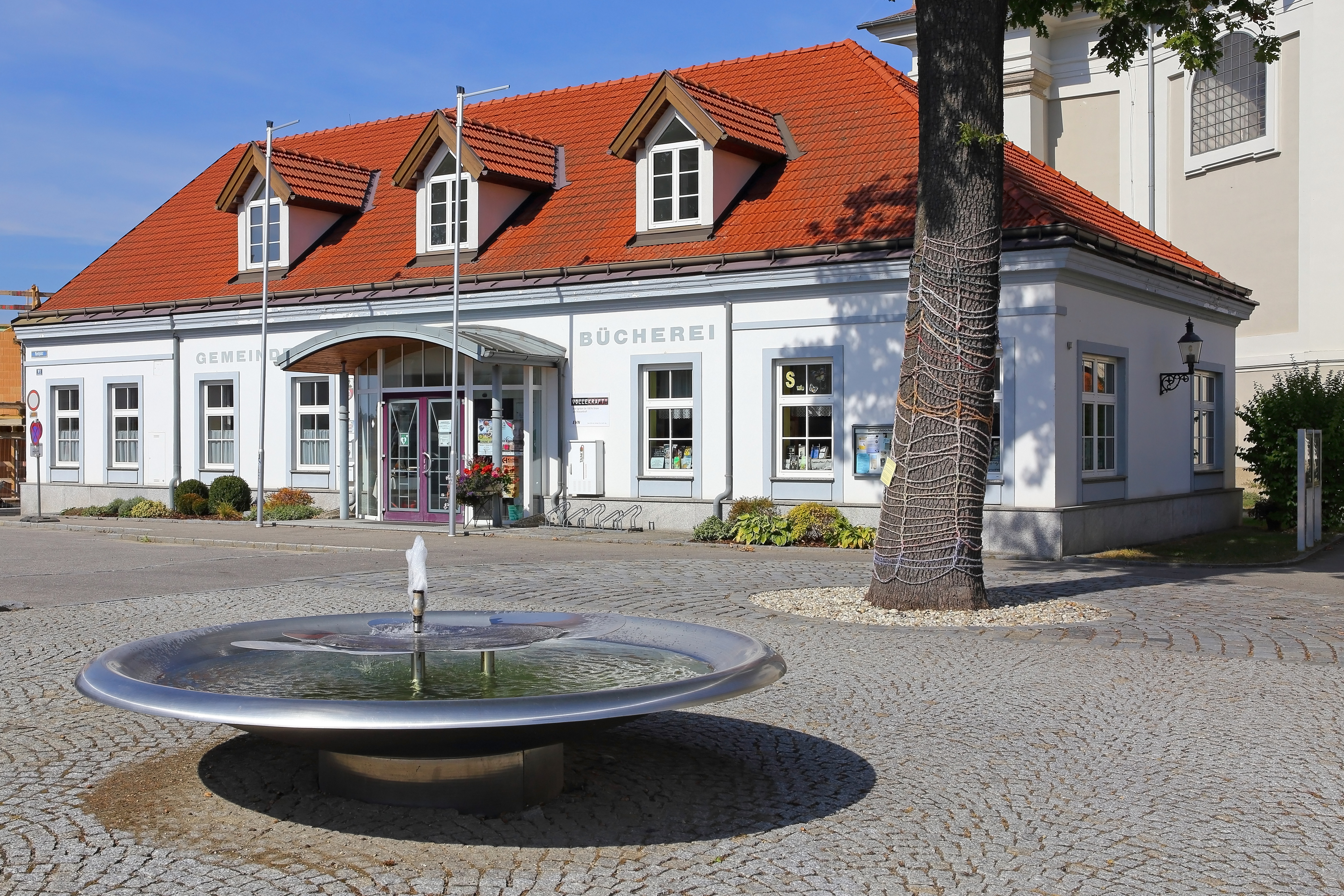
- Hoheneich town hall

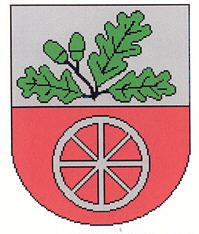
- Coat of arms

- Location within Austria
- Coordinates: 48°46′N 15°1′E
- Country: Austria
- State: Lower Austria
- District: Gmünd

Government
  - Mayor: Roland Wallner

Area
  - Total: 15.61 km^{2} (6.03 sq mi)
- Elevation: 521 m (1,709 ft)

Population (2018-01-01)
  - Total: 1,424
  - Density: 91.22/km^{2} (236.3/sq mi)
- Time zone: UTC+1 (CET)
  - Summer (DST): UTC+2 (CEST)
- Postal code: 3945
- Area code: 02852
- Website: www.hoheneich.at

Hoheneich is a town in the district of Gmünd in Lower Austria, Austria.
