= Heidenreichstein =

- Municipality
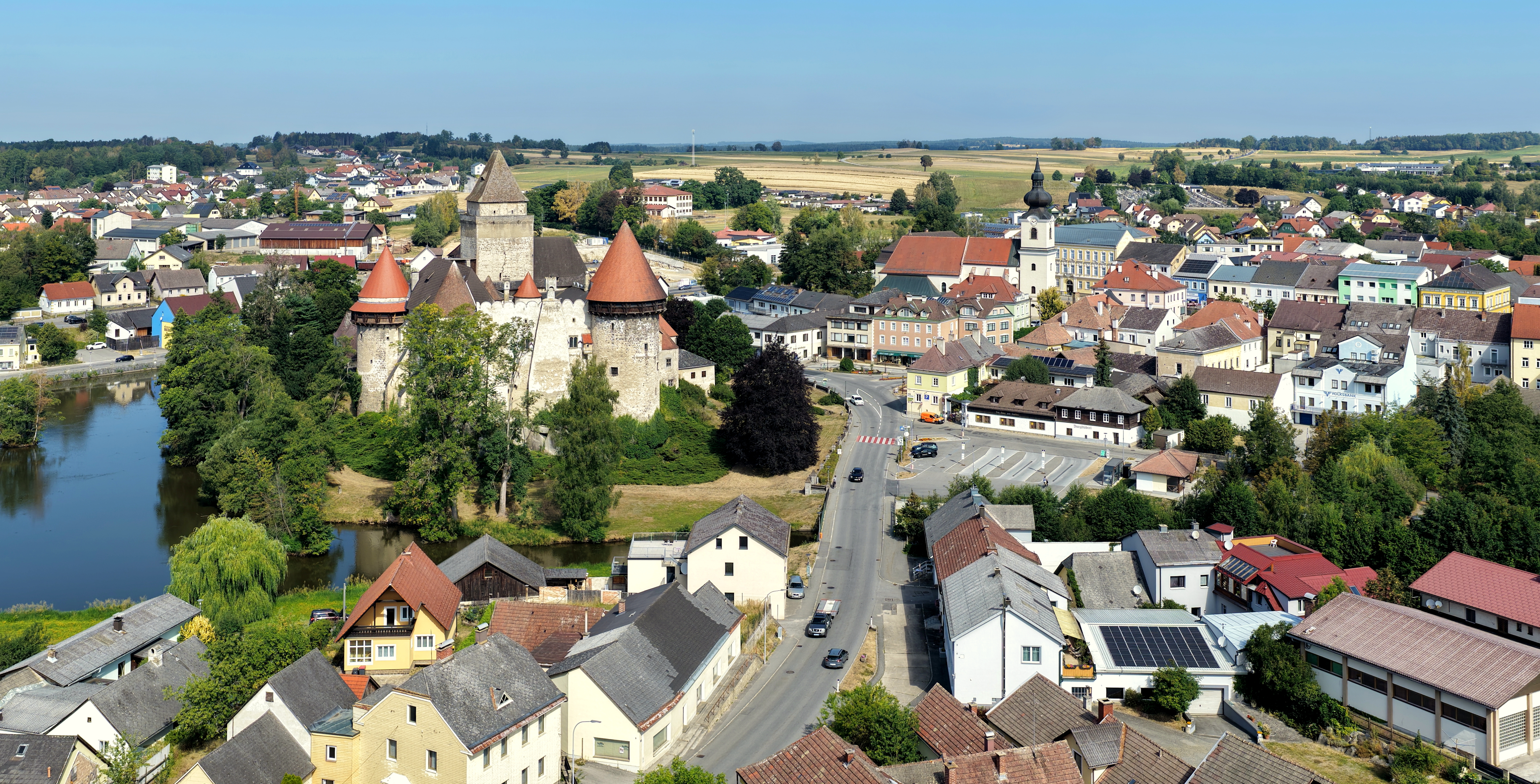
- Southeast view of Heidenreichstein

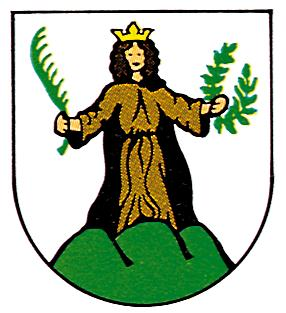
- Coat of arms

- Location within Austria
- Coordinates: 48°52′N 15°7′E
- Country: Austria
- State: Lower Austria
- District: Gmünd

Government
  - Mayor: Alexandra Weber (SPÖ)

Area
  - Total: 58.45 km^{2} (22.57 sq mi)
- Elevation: 561 m (1,841 ft)

Population (2018-01-01)
  - Total: 4,010
  - Density: 68.6/km^{2} (178/sq mi)
- Time zone: UTC+1 (CET)
  - Summer (DST): UTC+2 (CEST)
- Postal code: 3860
- Area code: 02862
- Website: www.heidenreichstein.gv.at

Heidenreichstein (German pronunciation: [haɪ̯dn̩ʁaɪ̯çˈʃtaɪ̯n]; archaic Czech: Kamýk) is a town in the district of Gmünd in the Austrian state of Lower Austria.

== Population ==
Historical population
Year	Pop.	±%
1869	3,915	—
1880	4,129	+5.5%
1890	4,158	+0.7%
1900	4,656	+12.0%
1910	5,465	+17.4%
1923	4,989	−8.7%
1934	5,407	+8.4%
1939	5,438	+0.6%
1951	5,552	+2.1%
1961	5,493	−1.1%
1971	5,773	+5.1%
1981	5,325	−7.8%
1991	4,849	−8.9%
2001	4,565	−5.9%
2011	4,107	−10.0%
