= Litschau =

- Municipality
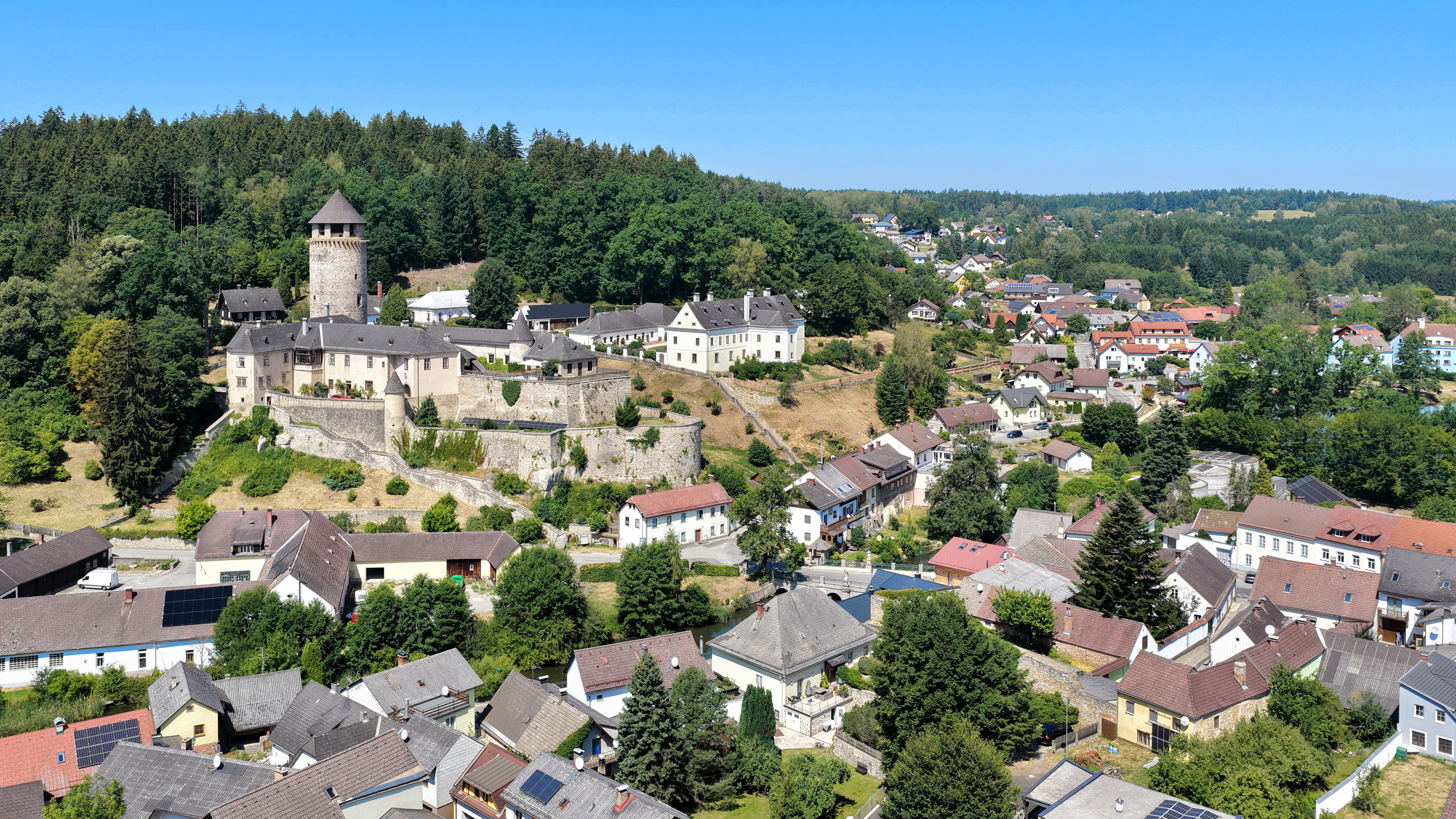
- Aerial view of Litschau

- Flag Coat of arms

- Location within Austria
- Coordinates: 48°56′N 15°2′E
- Country: Austria
- State: Lower Austria
- District: Gmünd

Government
  - Mayor: Rainer Hirschmann

Area
  - Total: 81.07 km^{2} (31.30 sq mi)
- Elevation: 531 m (1,742 ft)

Population (2018-01-01)
  - Total: 2,259
  - Density: 27.86/km^{2} (72.17/sq mi)
- Time zone: UTC+1 (CET)
  - Summer (DST): UTC+2 (CEST)
- Postal code: 3874
- Area code: 02865
- Website: www.litschau.at

Litschau (Czech: Ličov), is a town in the district of Gmünd in Lower Austria, Austria.
