= Waldviertel =

Subdivision of the region of Lower Austria

Coordinates: 48°31′N 15°15′E

The Waldviertel (Austrian German: [ˈvaldˌfɪrtl̩]; lit. 'forest quarter'; Central Bavarian: Woidviadl; Czech: Lesní čtvrť) is the northwestern region of the Austrian state of Lower Austria. It is bounded to the south by the river Danube, to the southwest by Upper Austria, to the northwest and to the north by the Czech Republic and to the east by the Manhartsberg (537 m, 1,762 ft), which is the survey point dividing the Waldviertel from the Weinviertel region. Geologically it is part of the Bohemian Massif. In the south are the Wachau and Kamptal wine regions.

== Districts ==
The following administrative districts of Lower Austria are considered to be part of the Waldviertel

- Krems
- Horn
- Waidhofen an der Thaya
- Gmünd
- Zwettl
- northern part of Melk
- statutory city of Krems an der Donau

== Economy ==
Since the Middle Ages, numerous cottage factories producing glass have existed in the Waldviertel and South Bohemia - known as glasshouses. The oldest glasshouse in the Waldviertel dates back to 1371. In historical times, Waldviertel sands were good raw materials for forest glass production, especially for colored glass.
