= Jakub Krčín =

Czech architect and engineer

Jakub Krčín of Jelčany
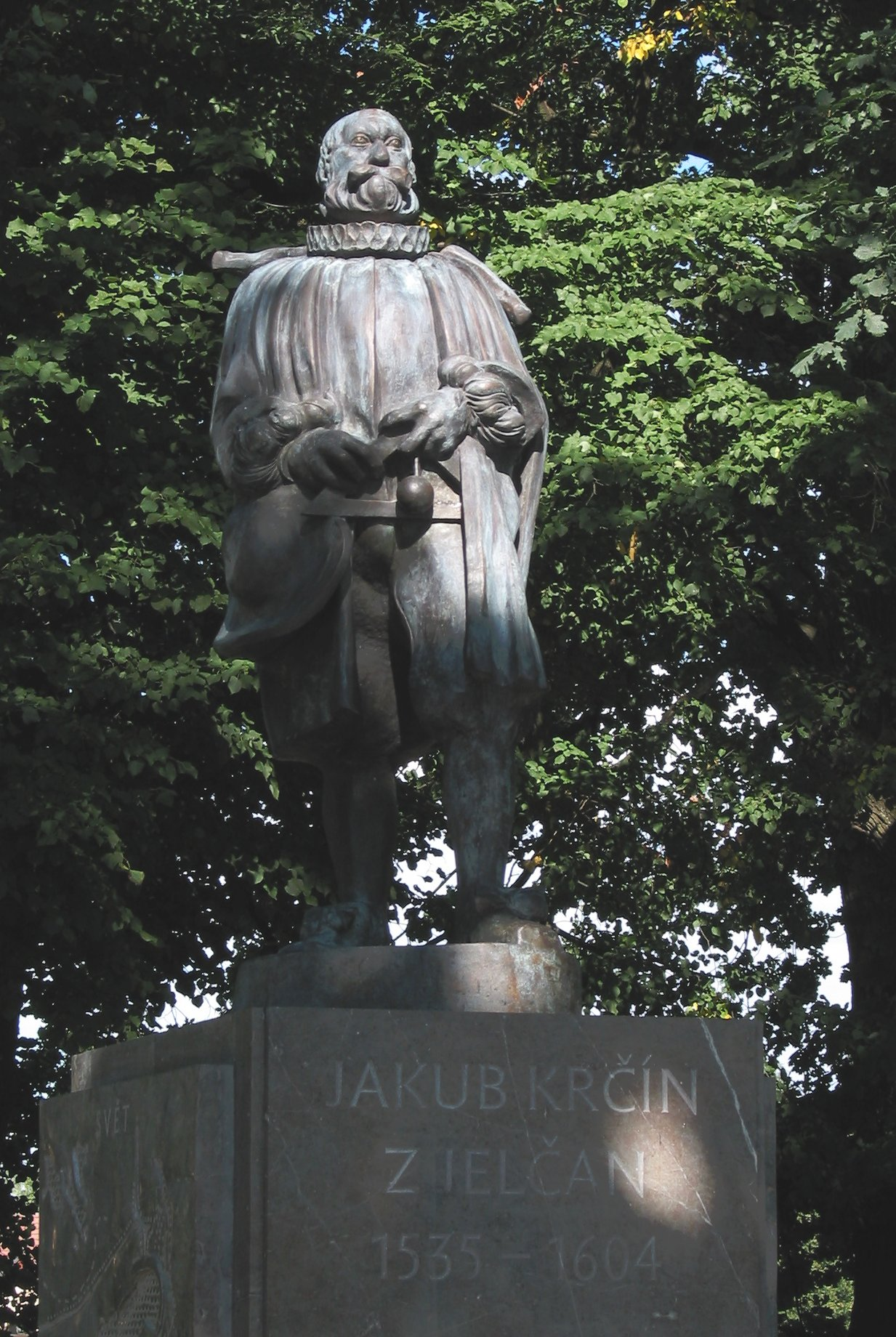
- Statue of Jakub Krčín in Třeboň
- Born: 18 June 1535; Kolín, Bohemia
- Died: January or February 1604 (aged 68); Sedlčany or Obděnice, Bohemia
- Occupations: architect, engineer, manager

Jakub Krčín of Jelčany (Czech: Jakub Krčín z Jelčan; 18 June 1535 – January or February 1604) was a Czech architect, engineer and manager. He worked for William of Rosenberg for 21 years. He was known for his organisational and economic skills, which made him the administrator of the largest property complex in Bohemia. Today he is best known as the founder of many fishponds in Bohemia, including the largest fishpond in the world, Rožmberk Pond.

== Early life and education ==
Jakub Krčín was born on 18 June 1535 to Jiřík Krčín of Jelčany and Kateřina of Olbramovice. He was probably born in Kolín, but some sources suggest that he may have been born in Polepy. He had two brothers and two sisters. He possibly attended the University of Prague. In 1556, his father was knighted, which helped Jakub gain a better social status.

== Social rise and working for the Rosenberg family ==
In 1556, Krčín entered the service of the nobleman Vilém Trčka of Lípa, and was tasked with looking after his Veliš estate. He was in charge of the overall management, and supervised the fishponds and the meadows. In 1559, he entered the service of the rich and powerful Rosenberg family. He spent at least one year as an official in Borovany, taking care of the local Augustinian monastery's property (located within the estate of the Rosenbergs). From 1561, he worked directly for William of Rosenberg, and this cooperation lasted until 1589. Jakub Krčín was first an assistant of the burgrave, and from 1562 the burgrave at the Český Krumlov Castle.

It soon became clear that Krčín had excellent organisational skills, was a great manager and economic strategist. He understood the importance of the most profitable areas of management, which were agriculture, brewing, and fish farming. He had built new breweries, mills, sheepfolds and fishponds. He also had reconstructed the Český Krumlov Castle. Krčín was appointed supreme regent of the entire Rosenberg estate in 1569. For the next twenty years, he governed the dominion, which meant taking care of the largest property complex in the Kingdom of Bohemia.

=== Construction of fishponds ===
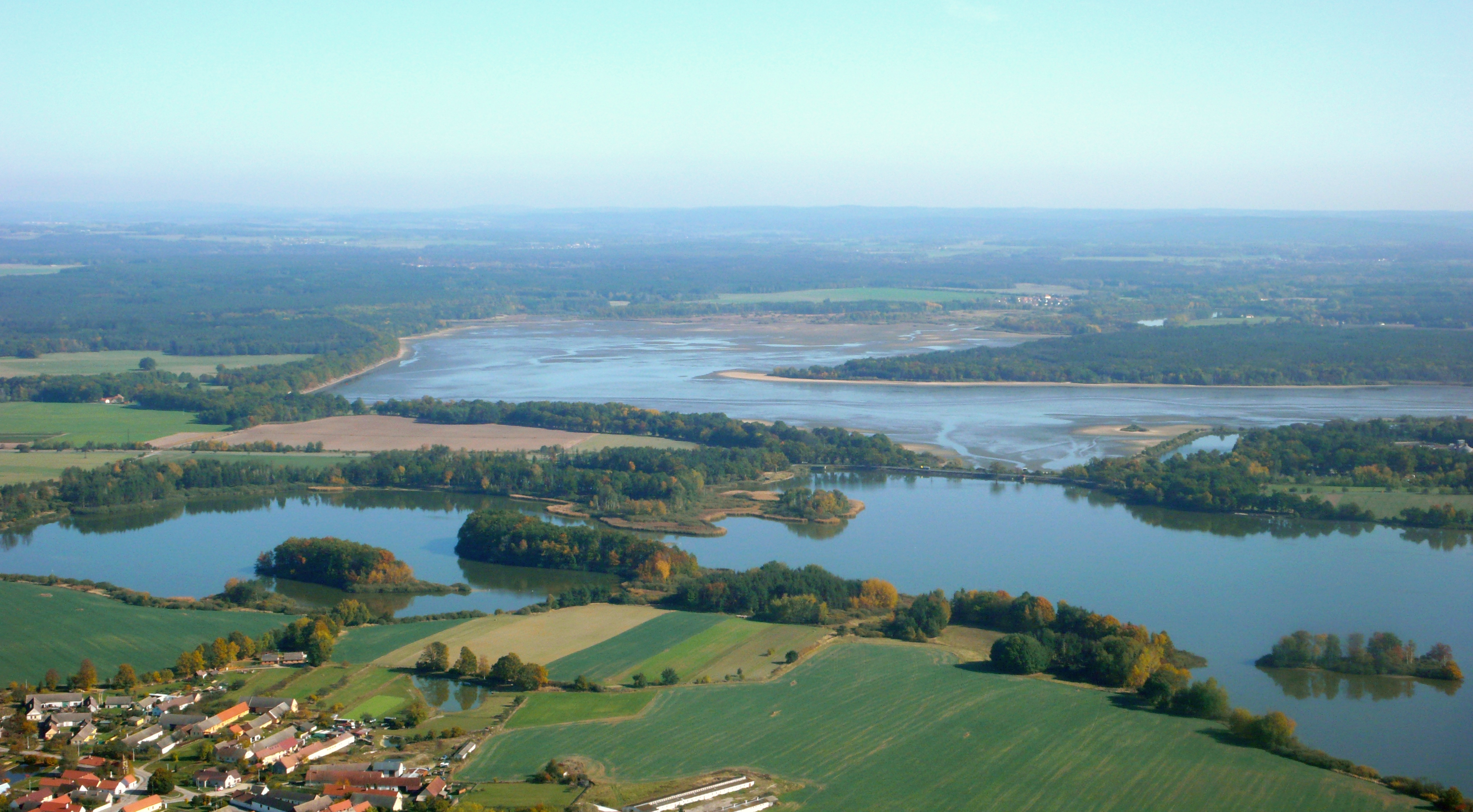
Rožmberk and Káňov ponds, work of Jakub Krčín

Krčín is known for his construction of fishponds. He held the principle that "even the worst soil can be changed to gold by a pond." From 1561 to 1579, Krčín built or extended around 44 water reservoirs. He knew how to measure and build fishponds and bring water into them, which sometimes meant building several kilometres of artificial canals. He is particularly known for his work on the fishponds of the Třeboň Basin. In 1570, he started the construction of Svět Pond (initially called Nevděk), which is among the largest ponds in the Czech Republic. He had part of the town of Třeboň demolished for its construction. In 1584–1590, he built Rožmberk Pond, which is the largest fishpond in the world with an area of 4.89 km^{2} (1.89 sq mi).

Krčín's water structures were monumental and bold, but their construction was expensive and fish production was not high, so today his work is viewed as economically unwise.

== Marriage and personal life ==
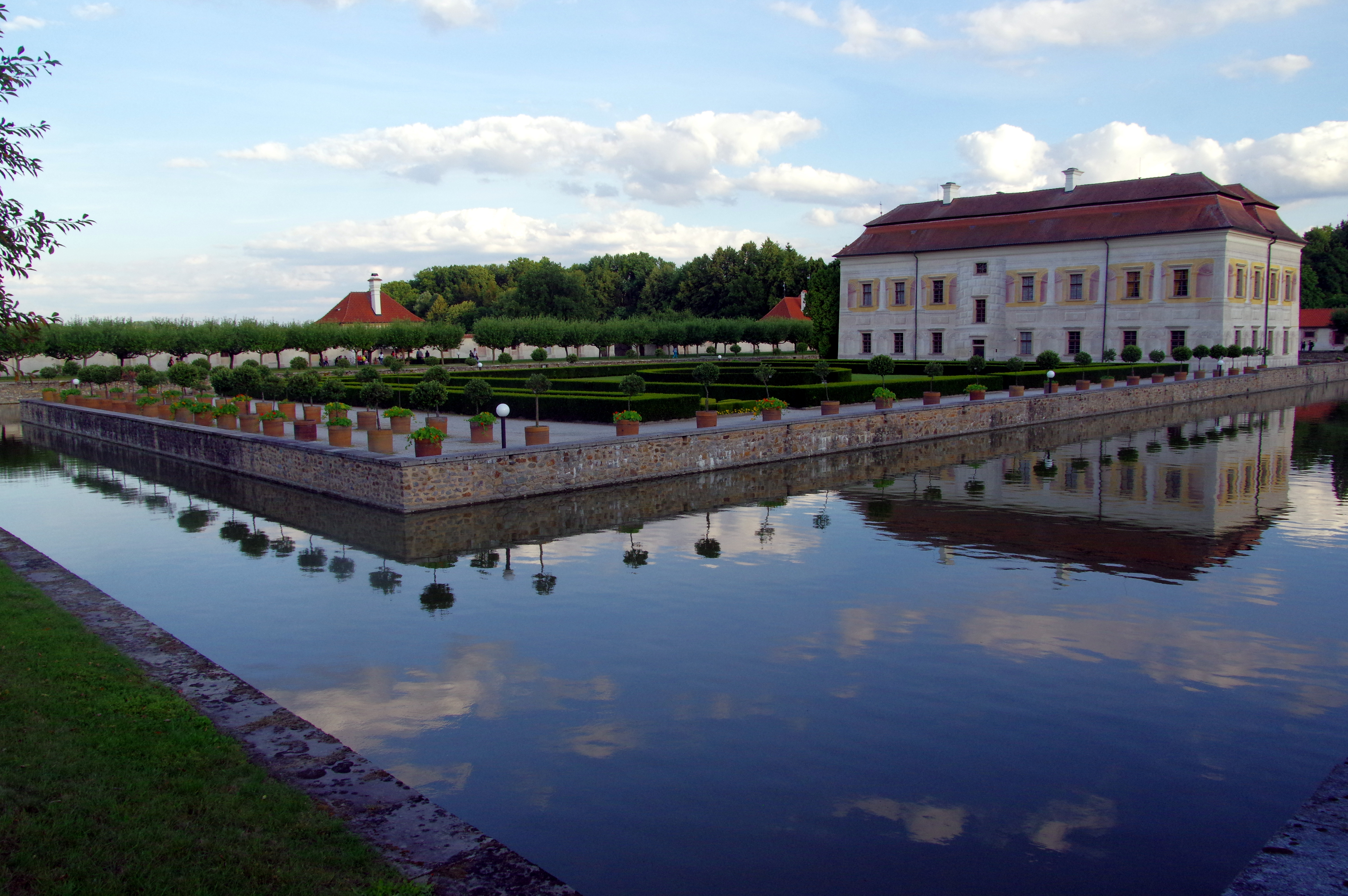
Kratochvíle Castle

In 1566, Krčín married Dorota Slepičková, a widowed lesser noblewoman, who was thirty years older than Krčín. He also acquired her house in Latrán quarter of Český Krumlov. He hoped she would die soon, but they were married for 21 years, until her death in 1587. In 1569, when he was appointed supreme regent, Krčín received the Leptáč fortress from William of Rosenberg. He immediately rebuilt and improved his new residence. William liked Leptáč so much that in 1580 he exchanged it with Krčín for the Sedlčany estate, including ten villages around Sedlčany. William then replaced the fortress with a new Renaissance castle, known as Kratochvíle Castle, which was designed by Jakub Krčín.

Krčín often travelled around the estate and enjoyed alcohol and love affairs. His interests also included alchemy. In 1588, shortly after the death of his first wife, Krčín married a second time. His second wife was Kateřina, the daughter of a pond keeper. They had five or six daughters and no sons.

== Later life and death ==
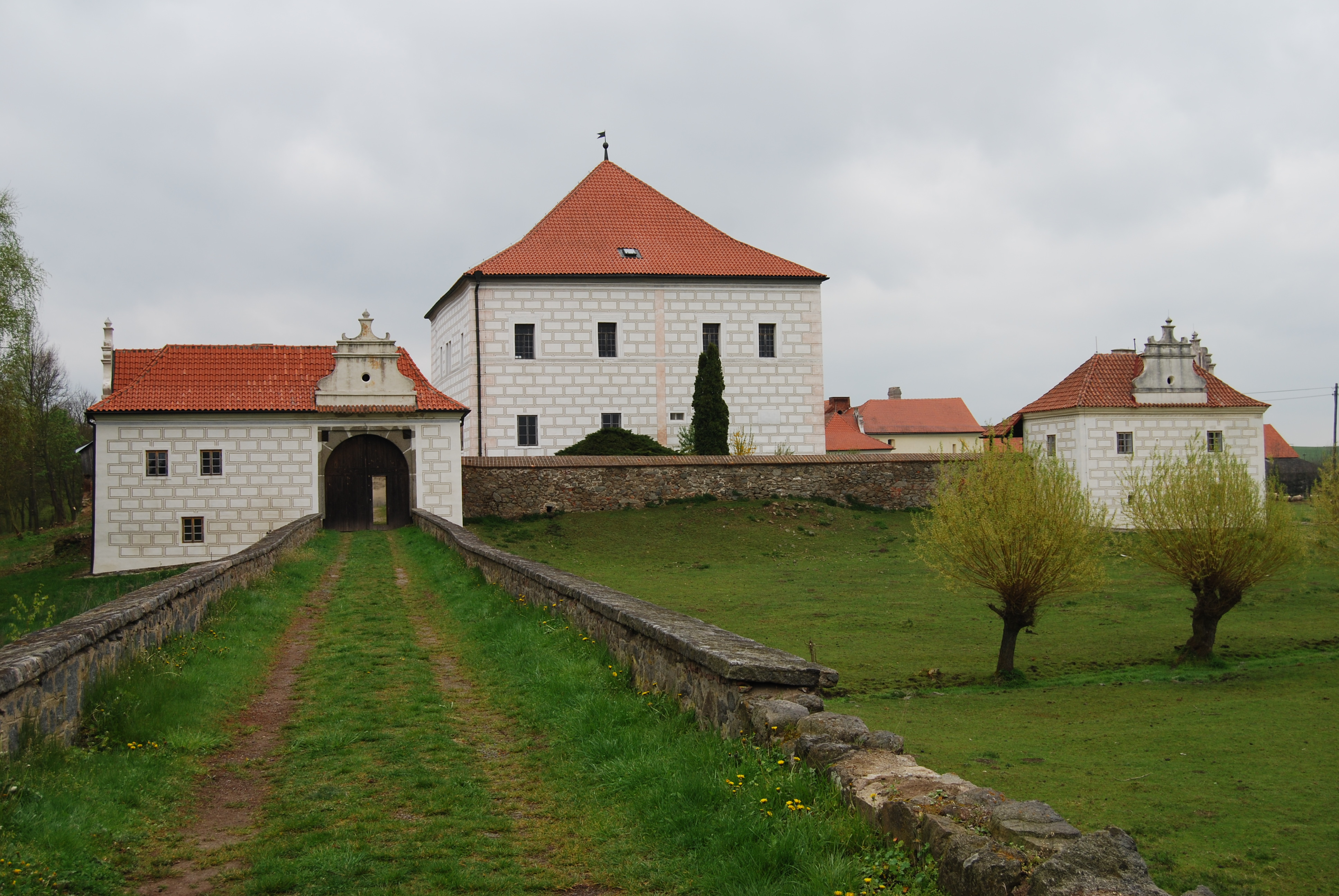
Křepenice Fort, also called Nový Hrádek Krčínov

In 1590, Krčín left the service for the Rosenbergs and moved to Křepenice within the Sedlčany estate, where he built a Renaissace water fort similar to Kratochvíle. The fort also included an alchemical laboratory. Krčín spent the last years of his life in Obděnice near Sedlčany. He had a grave prepared for him in the church in Obděnice, but it remained empty and the date of death was not added, so it is uncertain where he died, but probably in Sedlčany or Obděnice. He most likely died between 18 January and 10 February 1604.

== Honours and legacy ==
Krčín changed the landscape of the Třeboň Basin into the form in which it has been preserved to this day. Despite the fact that it is an artificially created landscape, it has a high value and is protected as the Třeboňsko Landscape Area with an area of 700 km^{2} (270 sq mi).

In Třeboň, on the dam of Svět Pond, there is a memorial to Jakub Krčín with his statue. A memorial plaque of Jakub Krčín is in Krčínova street in Třeboň. Streets named after Jakub Krčín are also in Ostrava, České Budějovice Ústí nad Labem, Kolín and Borovany.

In 2015, the Krčín Carving event took place in Obděnice. Various wooden sculptures thematically related to Jakub Krčín were created. They were then transported to several locations associated with Krčín's life, including Obděnice, Křepenice, Vysoký Chlumec, Kosova Hora, Kamýk nad Vltavou, and other.

== See also ==
- Josef Štěpánek Netolický, other notable fishpond builder in Bohemia
