= Erwin Scharf =

Erwin Scharf may refer to:

- Erwin Scharf (art director) (1901–1972), Austrian art director
- Erwin Scharf (politician) (1914-1994), Austrian politician
