= Halámky =

- Municipality
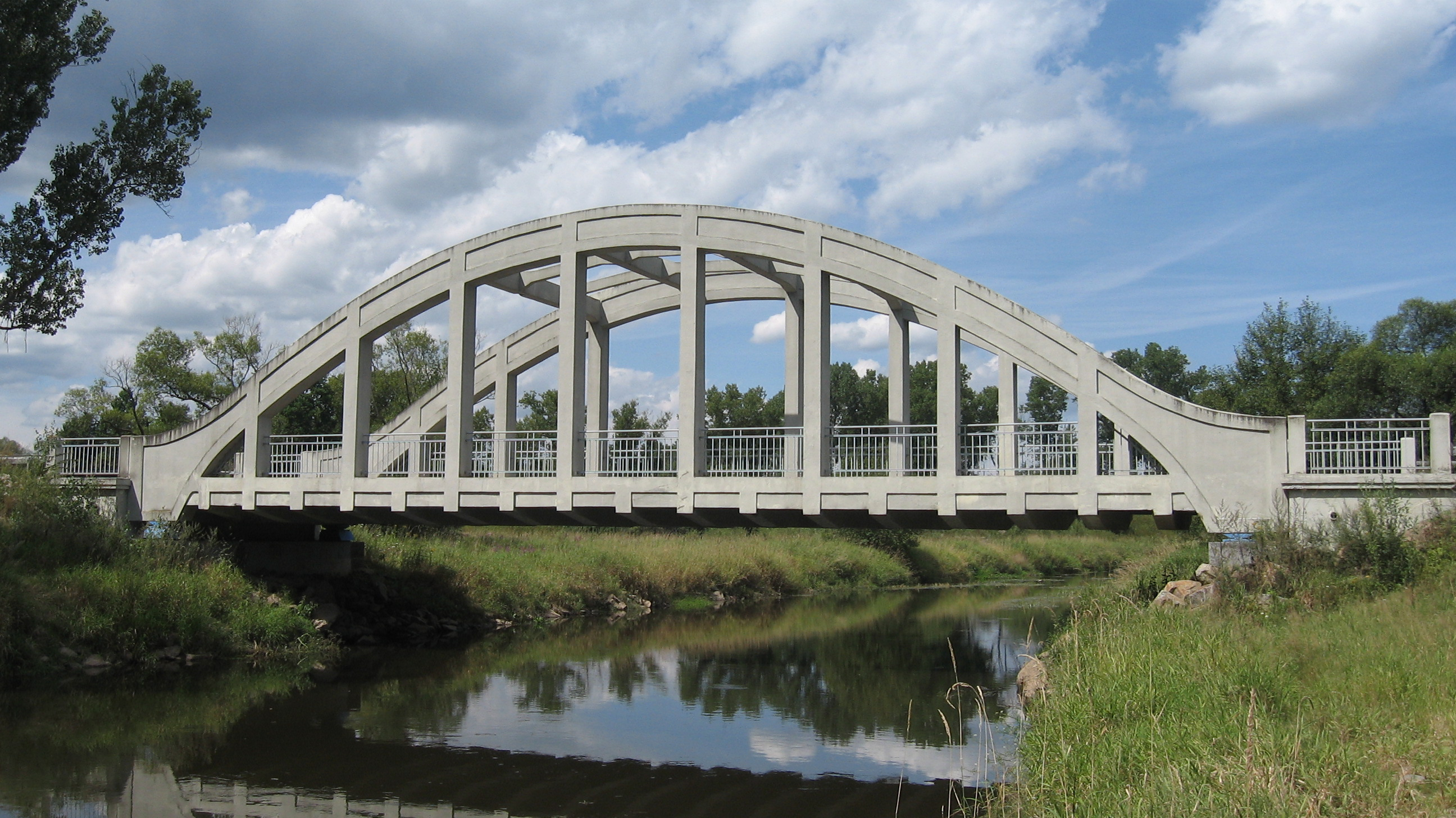
- Bridge over the Lužnice River

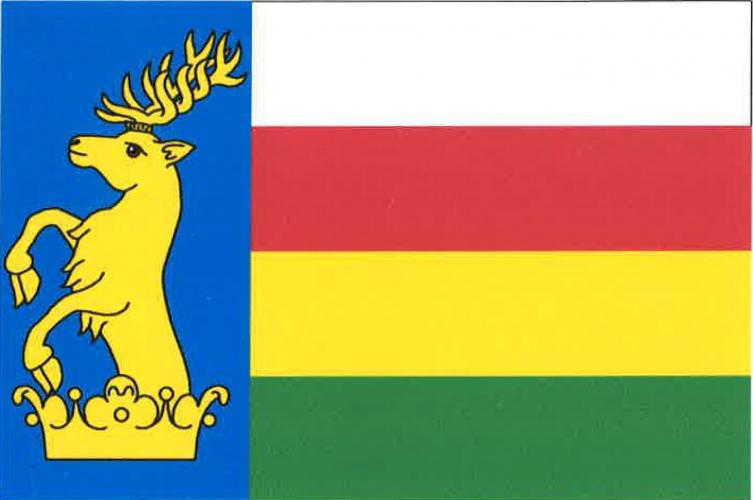
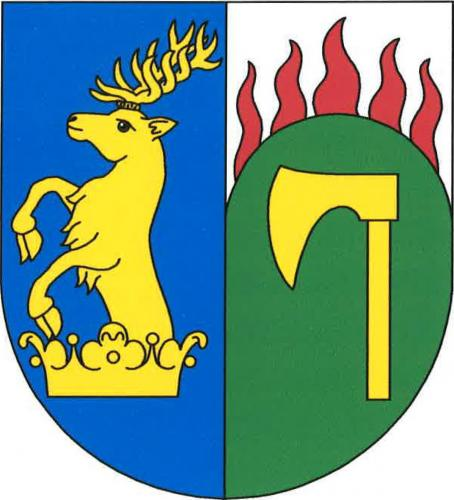
- Flag Coat of arms

- Location in the Czech Republic
- Coordinates: 48°51′12″N 14°54′54″E
- Country: Czech Republic
- Region: South Bohemian
- District: Jindřichův Hradec
- First mentioned: 1783

Area
  - Total: 6.90 km^{2} (2.66 sq mi)
- Elevation: 462 m (1,516 ft)

Population (2026-01-01)
  - Total: 160
  - Density: 23/km^{2} (60/sq mi)
- Time zone: UTC+1 (CET)
  - Summer (DST): UTC+2 (CEST)
- Postal code: 378 06
- Website: www.halamky.info

Halámky (German: Witschkoberg) is a municipality and village in Jindřichův Hradec District in the South Bohemian Region of the Czech Republic. It has about 200 inhabitants.

== Etymology ==
The original German name Witschkoberg was probably derived from Czech Vilčkoberg, meaning "Vlček's hill". The Czech name Halámky was derived from the personal name Halama.

== Geography ==
Halámky is located about 32 kilometres (20 mi) south of Jindřichův Hradec and 34 km (21 mi) southeast of České Budějovice. It lies in the Třeboň Basin. The municipality is situated on the right bank of the Lužnice River, which forms the western municipal border.

== History ==
The first written mention of Halámky is from 1783. The village was founded around 1730. The inhabitants made a living by logging, producing charcoal, making baskets and roof shingles. A special activity of the residents was the care of children from the Viennese poorhouses with the financial support of the city of Vienna.

== Demographics ==
Historical population

Year	Pop.	±%
1869	373	—
1880	417	+11.8%
1890	449	+7.7%
1900	499	+11.1%
1910	505	+1.2%

Year	Pop.	±%
1921	469	−7.1%
1930	386	−17.7%
1950	286	−25.9%
1961	307	+7.3%
1970	271	−11.7%

Year	Pop.	±%
1980	252	−7.0%
1991	202	−19.8%
2001	168	−16.8%
2011	170	+1.2%
2021	167	−1.8%

Source: Censuses

== Transport ==
The I/24 road (part of European route E49) from Třeboň to the Czech–Austrian border runs through the municipality. However, the road border crossing Halámky / Nagelberg is located outside the municipal territory.

== Sights ==
A technical monument is the bridge over the Lužnice. It is a reinforced concrete arch bridge with an arch span of 5 m (16 ft).
