= Neplachov =

- Municipality
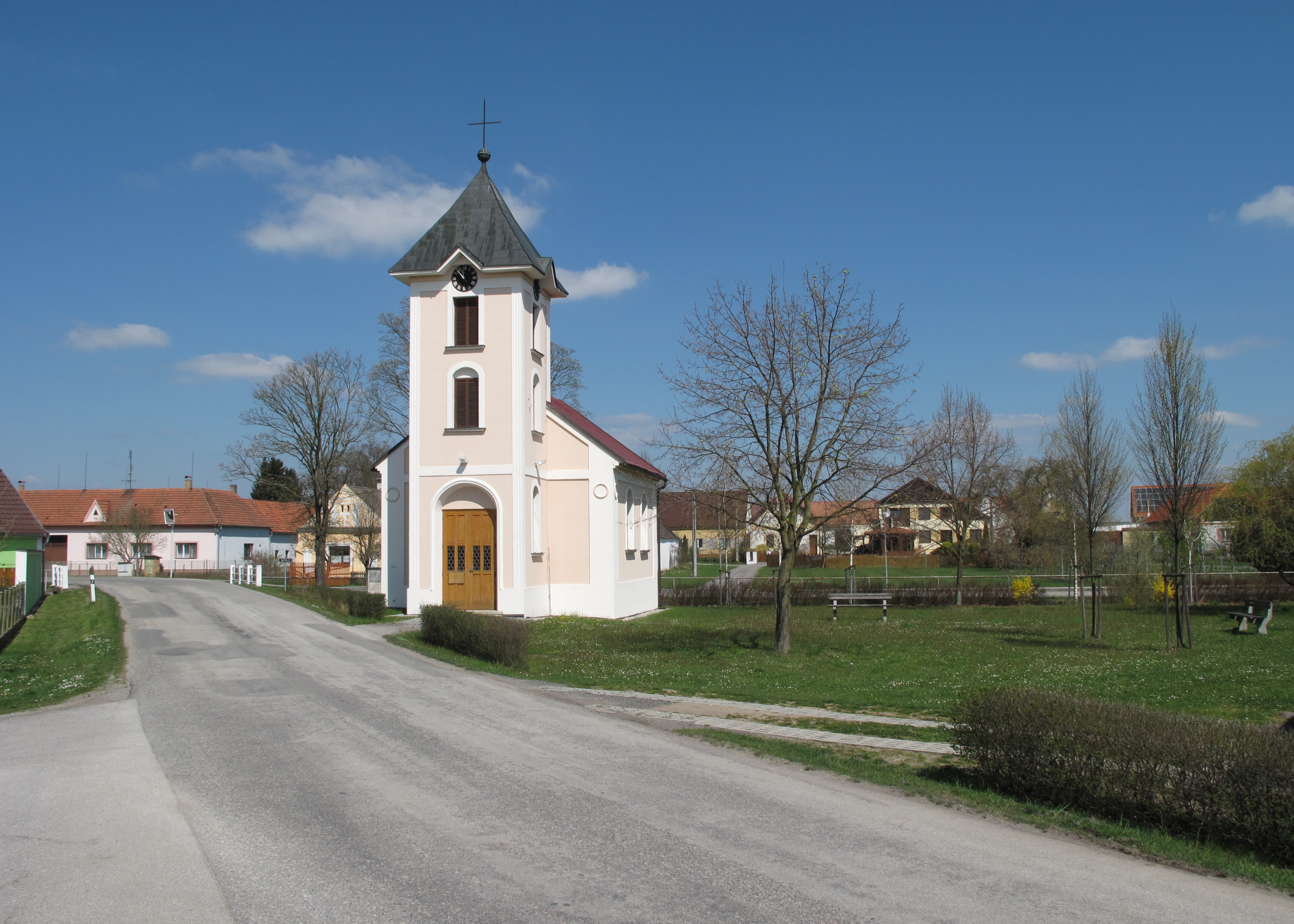
- Centre of Neplachov

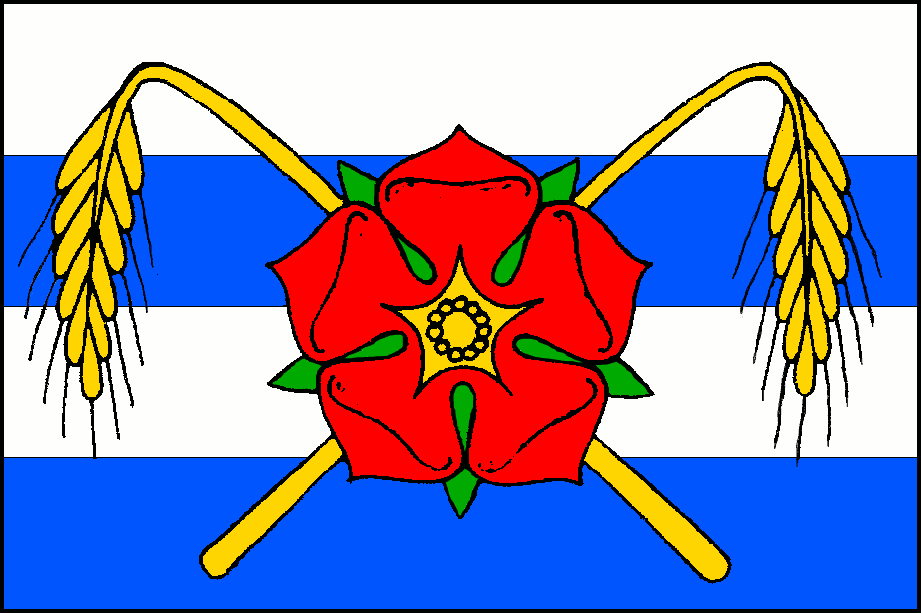
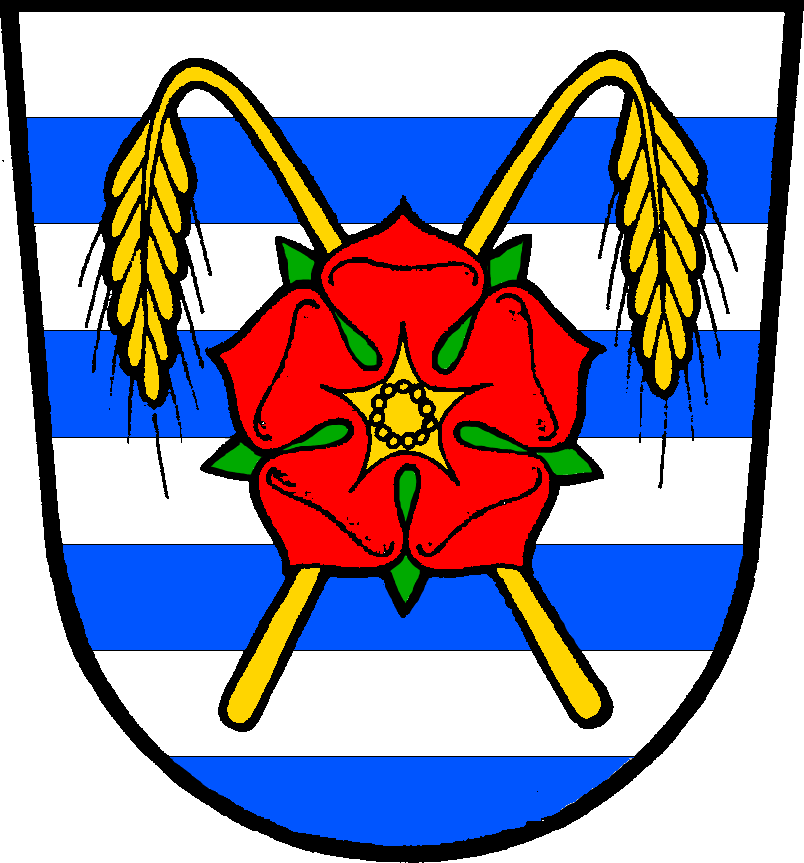
- Flag Coat of arms

- Location in the Czech Republic
- Coordinates: 49°7′49″N 14°36′4″E
- Country: Czech Republic
- Region: South Bohemian
- District: České Budějovice
- First mentioned: 1323

Area
  - Total: 10.88 km^{2} (4.20 sq mi)
- Elevation: 433 m (1,421 ft)

Population (2026-01-01)
  - Total: 365
  - Density: 33.5/km^{2} (86.9/sq mi)
- Time zone: UTC+1 (CET)
  - Summer (DST): UTC+2 (CEST)
- Postal code: 373 65
- Website: www.neplachov.cz

Neplachov is a municipality and village in České Budějovice District in the South Bohemian Region of the Czech Republic. It has about 400 inhabitants.

== Etymology ==
The initial name of the village was Neplachovice. The name was derived from the personal name Neplach, meaning "the village of Neplach's people". Already in the 14th century, the name was shortened to its present form.

== Geography ==
Neplachov is located about 19 kilometres (12 mi) northeast of České Budějovice. It lies mostly in the Třeboň Basin, only the western forested part of the municipality extends into the Tábor Uplands. The highest point is at 489 m (1,604 ft) above sea level.

== History ==
The first written mention of Neplachov is in a deed of King John of Bohemia from 1323. In 1713, the village was badly damaged by a fire.

== Demographics ==
Historical population

Year	Pop.	±%
1869	575	—
1880	510	−11.3%
1890	508	−0.4%
1900	540	+6.3%
1910	568	+5.2%

Year	Pop.	±%
1921	565	−0.5%
1930	495	−12.4%
1950	420	−15.2%
1961	412	−1.9%
1970	373	−9.5%

Year	Pop.	±%
1980	401	+7.5%
1991	396	−1.2%
2001	365	−7.8%
2011	369	+1.1%
2021	351	−4.9%

Source: Censuses

== Transport ==
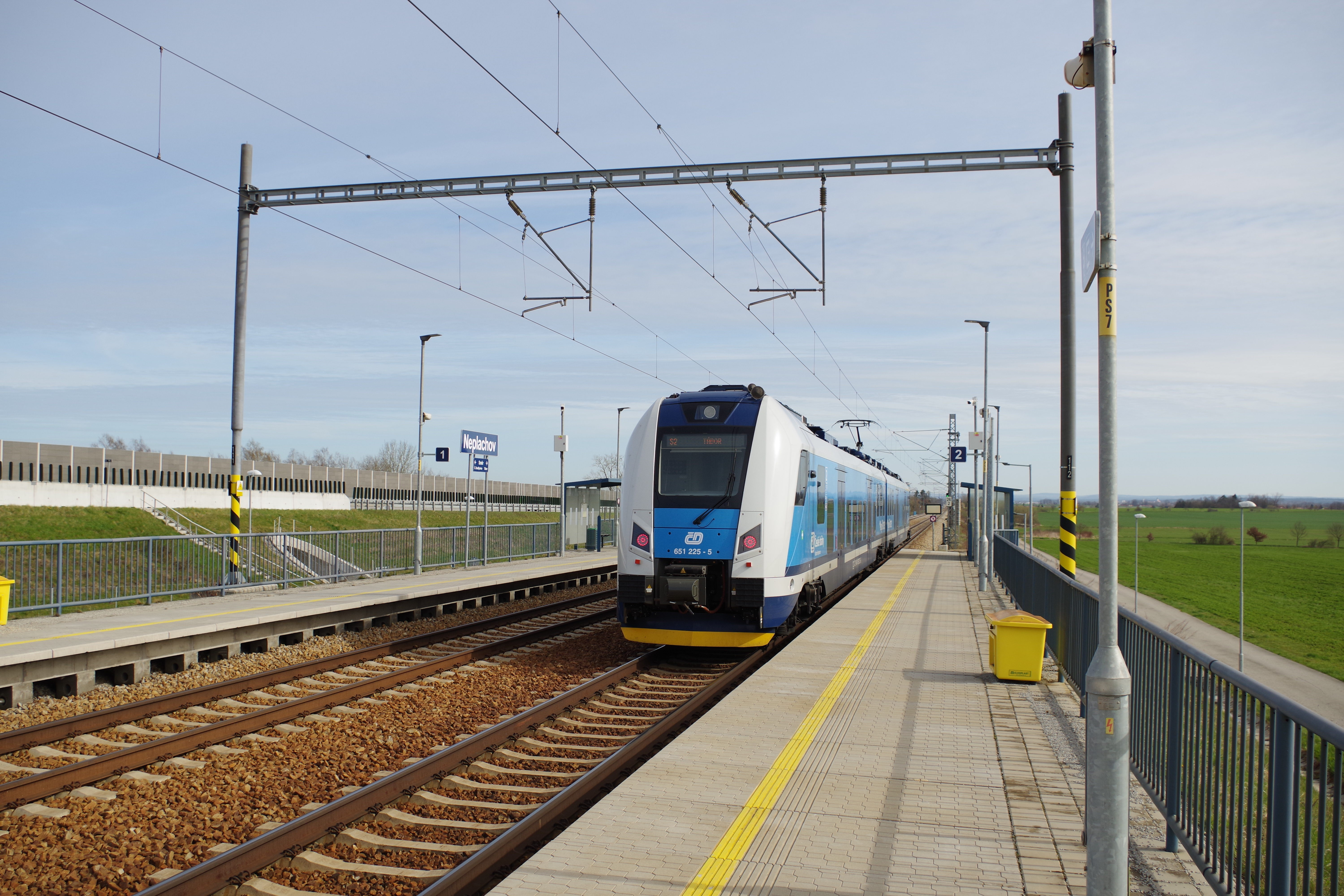
Train stop

The D3 motorway (part of the European route E55) from České Budějovice to Tábor runs through the municipality.

Neplachov is located on the railway line České Budějovice–Tábor.

== Sights ==
There are no protected cultural monuments in the municipality. The main landmark of Neplachov is the Chapel of Saint Wenceslaus. It was built in 1929.
