= Susta =

Susta may refer to:

== Geography ==
- Susta territory, a disputed territory between Nepal and India
- Susta Rural Municipality, in Lumbini Province, Nepal
- Bardaghat Susta East, one of two parliamentary constituencies of the Parasi District of Nepal
- Bardaghat Susta West, one of two parliamentary constituencies of the Parasi District of Nepal

== People ==
- Gianluca Susta (born 1956), Italian politician
- Josef Šusta (aquaculturist) (1835–1914), Czech aquaculturist

== Other uses ==
- The Federation of Ukrainian Student Organizations of America
- Southern United States Trade Association
