= Netolický =

Netolický (feminine: Netolická) is a Czech toponymic surname, derived from the town of Netolice. Notable people with the surname include:

- Bob Netolicky (born 1942), American basketball player
- Josef Štěpánek Netolický (c. 1460 – 1538 or 1539), Czech fishpond builder and architect
- Martin Netolický (born 1982), Czech politician
