= Třeboň =

- Town
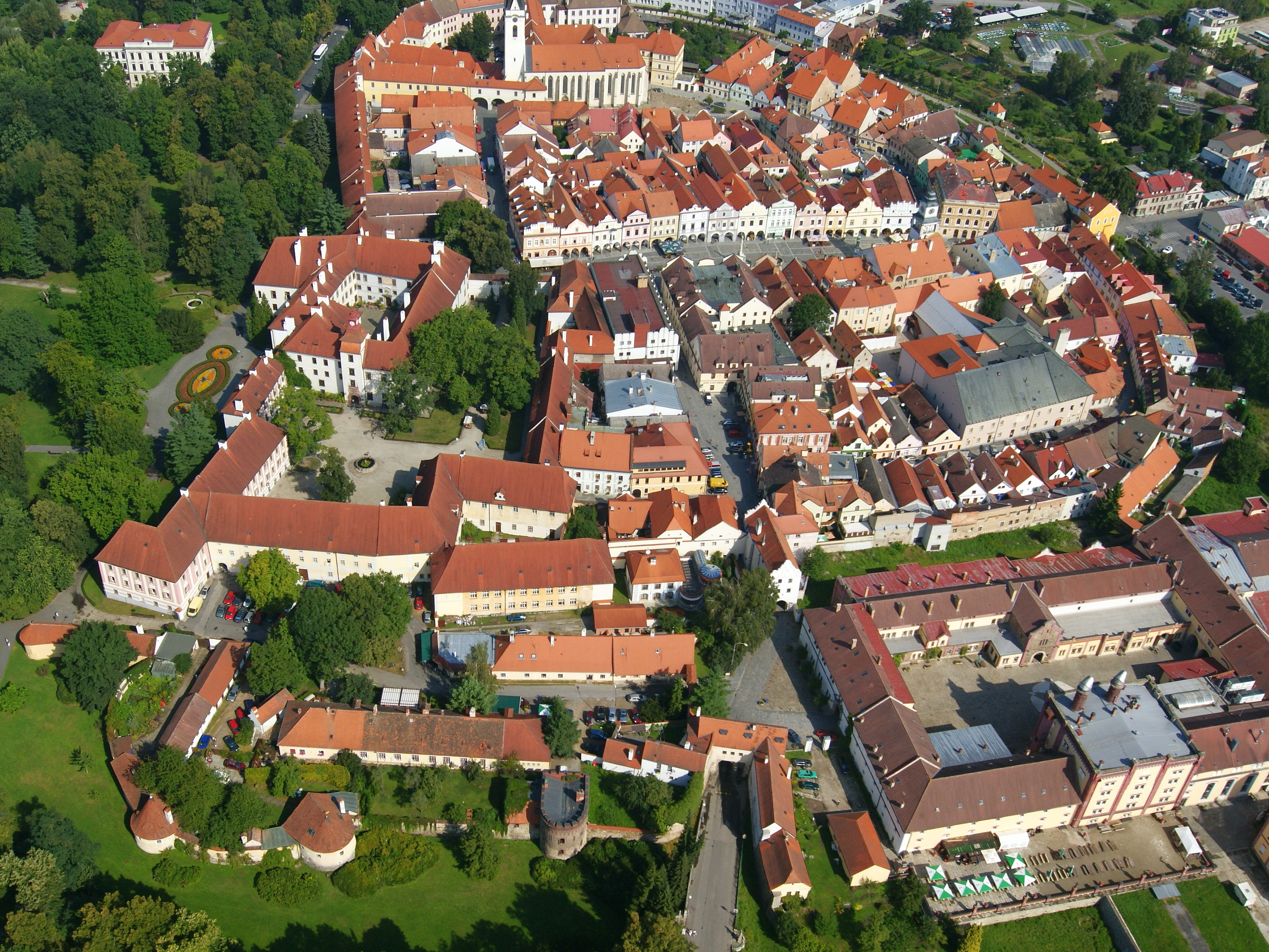
- Aerial view of the historical centre

- Flag Coat of arms

- Location in the Czech Republic
- Coordinates: 49°0′13″N 14°46′14″E
- Country: Czech Republic
- Region: South Bohemian
- District: Jindřichův Hradec
- First mentioned: 1280

Government
  - Mayor: Aleš Kolář

Area
  - Total: 98.31 km^{2} (37.96 sq mi)
- Elevation: 434 m (1,424 ft)

Population (2026-01-01)
  - Total: 8,249
  - Density: 83.91/km^{2} (217.3/sq mi)
- Time zone: UTC+1 (CET)
  - Summer (DST): UTC+2 (CEST)
- Postal code: 379 01
- Website: www.mesto-trebon.cz

Třeboň (Czech pronunciation: [ˈtr̝̊ɛboɲ]; German: Wittingau) is a spa town in Jindřichův Hradec District in the South Bohemian Region of the Czech Republic. It has about 8,200 inhabitants. The town is located in the Třeboň Basin, on the shore of the fishpond Svět. The Třeboň area is known for its high concentration of fishponds, including the largest fishpond in the world, Rožmberk Pond.

Třeboň was founded in the 12th century, and became an important and wealthy town during the rule of the Rosenberg family in the 14th century. The greatest development occurred in the 16th and early 17th centuries, when Jakub Krčín founded the system of fishponds around the town. The second notable noble owners of Třeboň were the Schwarzenberg family, who acquired the town in 1660.

The main landmark of the town is the Třeboň Castle. The historic town centre with the castle complex is well preserved and is protected as an urban monument reservation.

== Administrative division ==
Třeboň consists of eight municipal parts (in brackets population according to the 2021 census):

- Třeboň I (361)
- Třeboň II (5,712)
- Branná (368)
- Břilice (814)
- Holičky (214)
- Nová Hlína (134)
- Přeseka (120)
- Stará Hlína (228)

== Etymology ==
The name is derived from the personal name Třeboň (a shortened variant of the name Třebohost or Třebomysl).

== Geography ==
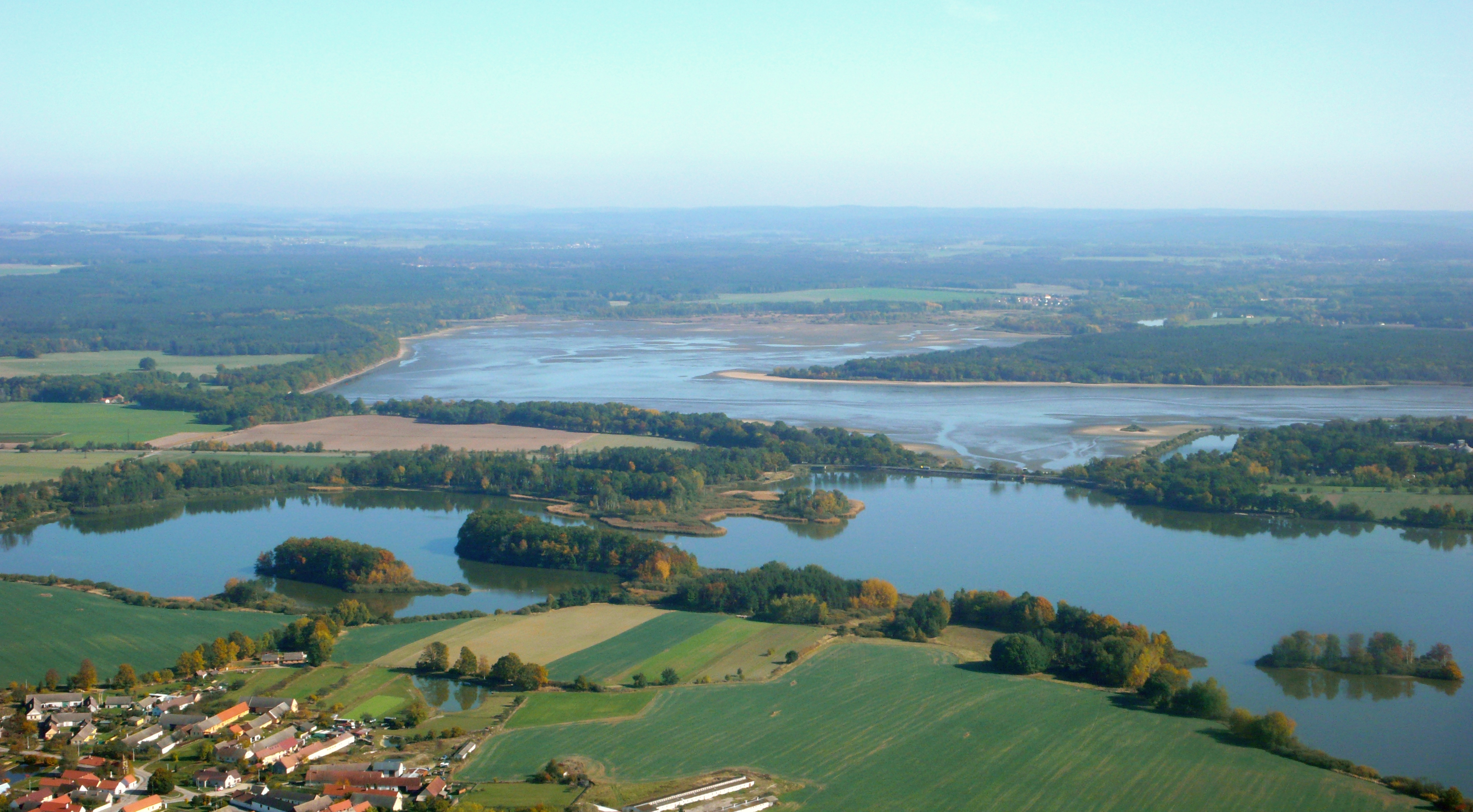
Rožmberk and Káňov ponds

Třeboň is located about 22 kilometres (14 mi) southwest of Jindřichův Hradec and 19 km (12 mi) east of České Budějovice. It lies in the Třeboň Basin. It is known for its bogs with rich deposits of peat, which led to establishment of peat spa in the town.

Třeboň is known for its fishponds, which were established in the region since Middle Ages. Rožmberk Pond is the largest pond in the country and the largest fishpond in the world, with surface area of 489 hectares (1,210 acres). It was built between 1584 and 1590. The urban area of Třeboň is located on the shore of Svět pond, also one of the largest Czech ponds with 201 ha (500 acres). It is primarily a fishpond, but also is used for sport and recreational purposes.

The whole municipal territory lies in the Třeboňsko Protected Landscape Area. The Lužnice river flows through the eastern part of the territory and supplies Rožmberk pond with water. There are many small watercourses, which supply the other ponds.

== History ==
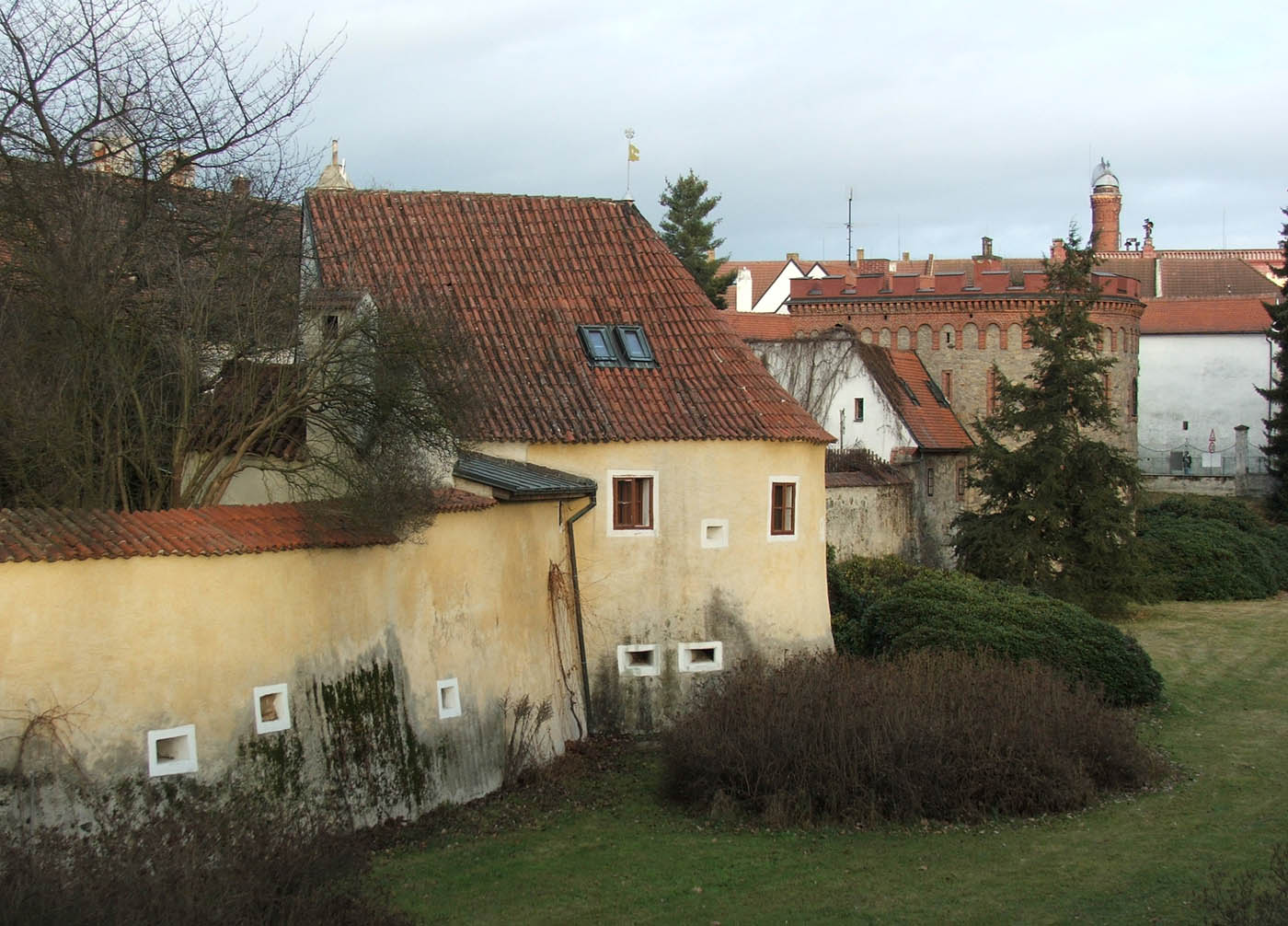
Fortification near Svět pond

Třeboň was established around the middle of the 12th century. Around 1300, Třeboň was already fortified. In 1341, it was first referred to as a town. In 1366, Třeboň's Czech name first appeared, and the Rosenberg family became owner of the estate. During their rule, the town gained importance and wealth. In 1376, Třeboň gained royal town privileges. At the end of the 14th century, the fortifications strengthened, which helped resist attacks during the Hussite Wars.

The greatest development occurred in the 16th and early 17th centuries, when Jakub Krčín was at the head of the Rosenberg family business and started to establish new ponds in the area. The region became famous as a fishpond farming area. The end of prosperity came with extinction of the Rosenberg family, troop invasions, and several large fires. Třeboň further suffered during the Thirty Years' War, when it was held by a regiment of Scots led by Colonel Sir John Seton from 1620 to early 1622. From 1660 to the 20th century, the Schwarzenberg family owned the town and the estate.

The town slowly recovered and remained economically unimportant until the 19th century, when it became a district town. Until 1918, Třeboň – Wittingau was part of Austria-Hungary, in the district with the same name, one of the 94 Bezirkshauptmannschaften in Bohemia.

After World War II, the first larger industry (clothing factory and large-scale agricultural production) was established in the town. In 1960, the Třeboň district was abolished and the town received spa status.

== Demographics ==
Historical population

Year	Pop.	±%
1869	7,463	—
1880	8,132	+9.0%
1890	7,650	−5.9%
1900	7,755	+1.4%
1910	7,721	−0.4%

Year	Pop.	±%
1921	7,461	−3.4%
1930	7,042	−5.6%
1950	6,235	−11.5%
1961	6,988	+12.1%
1970	7,828	+12.0%

Year	Pop.	±%
1980	8,850	+13.1%
1991	9,052	+2.3%
2001	9,016	−0.4%
2011	8,554	−5.1%
2021	7,951	−7.0%

Source: Censuses

== Economy ==
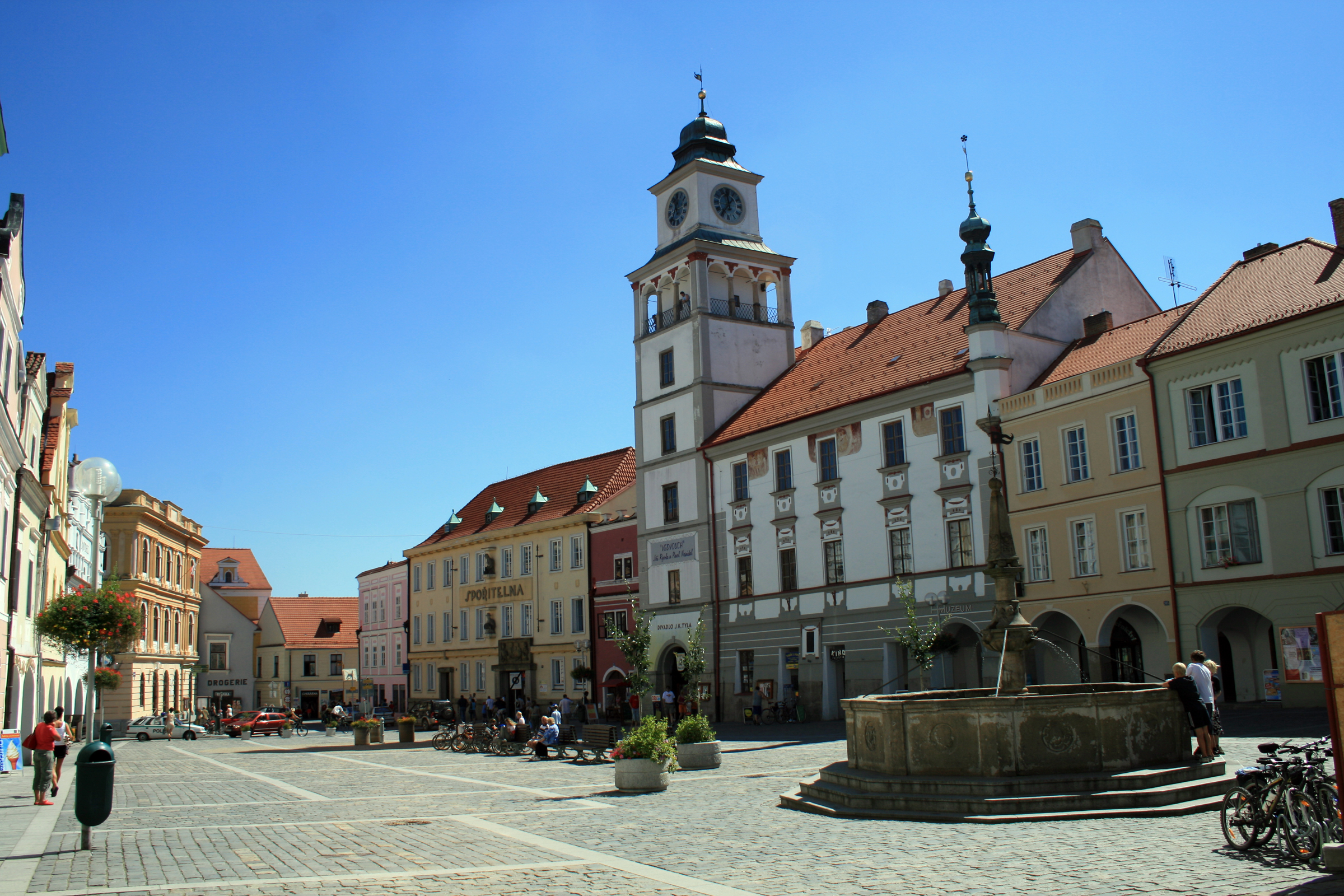
Masarykovo náměstí; Old Town Hall in the middle

Tourism is Třeboň's major economic activity, along with agriculture, the spa industry and other services.

The State Regional Archive for South Bohemia is based here, where genealogical studies about people born in the South Bohemian Region may be conducted. The archive was held at the Třeboň Castle for many years, although a substantial portion was moved to the municipal offices in 2014.

=== Spa ===
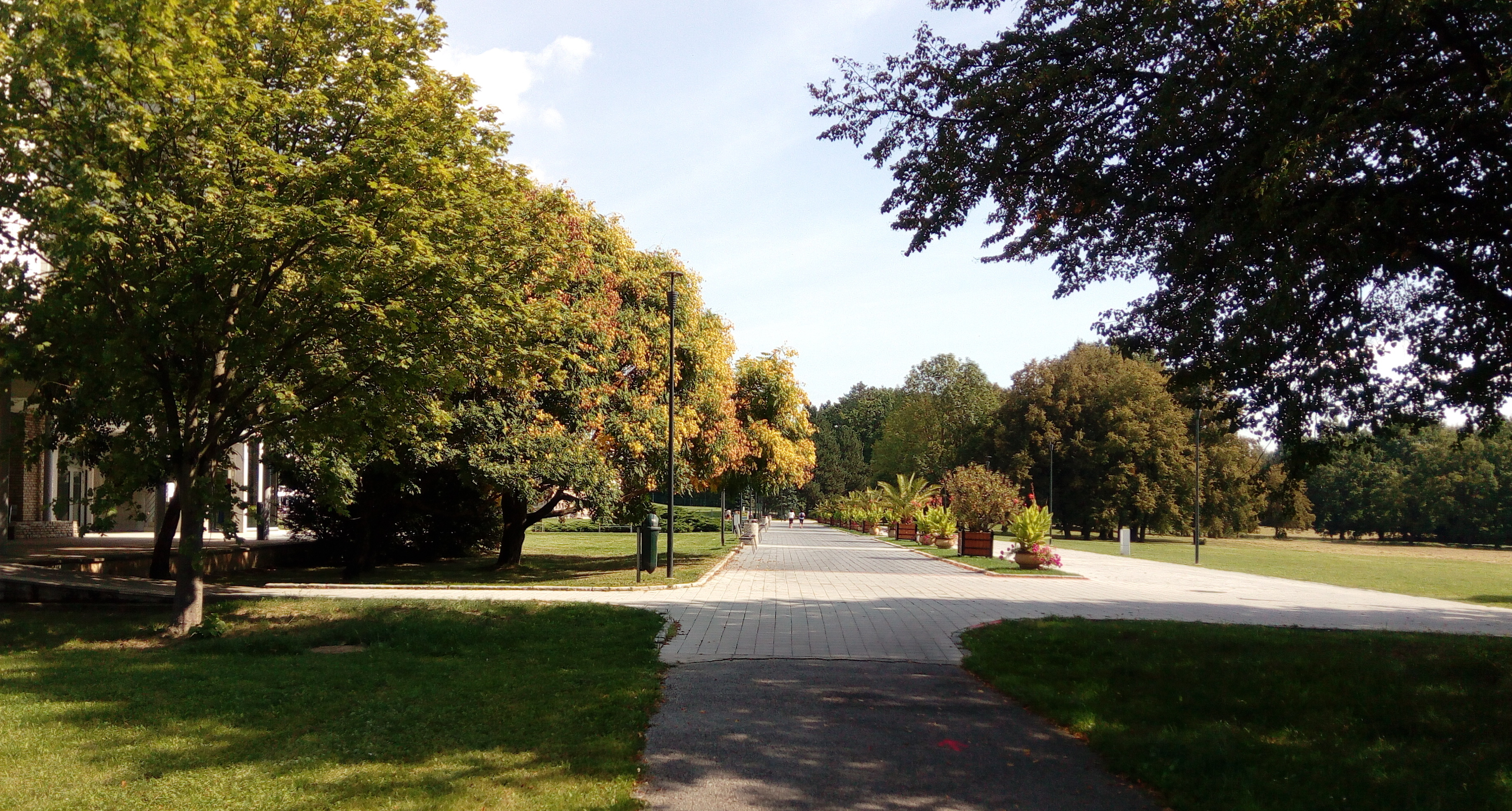
Spa promenade

The spa company Slatinné lázně Třeboň is the largest employer in the town with more than 500 employees. The peat spa in Třeboň focuses on the treatment of musculoskeletal disorders, rheumatic problems, and post-injury and post-surgery reconvalescence. The first modern spa in Třeboň was opened in 1883.

== Transport ==
Třeboň lies at the crossroads of two important roads: the I/24 (which connects the D3 motorway with the Czech–Austrian border near Halámky, part of the European route E49) and the I/34 (the section from České Budějovice to Jindřichův Hradec, part of the European route E551).

Třeboň is located on the major international railway line Prague–Vienna.

== Culture ==
The International Festival of Animated Films Anifest was held in Třeboň each May between 2002 and 2010; after that, Anifilm took its place. However, Anifest was moved from Třeboň to Liberec in 2020.

== Sights ==
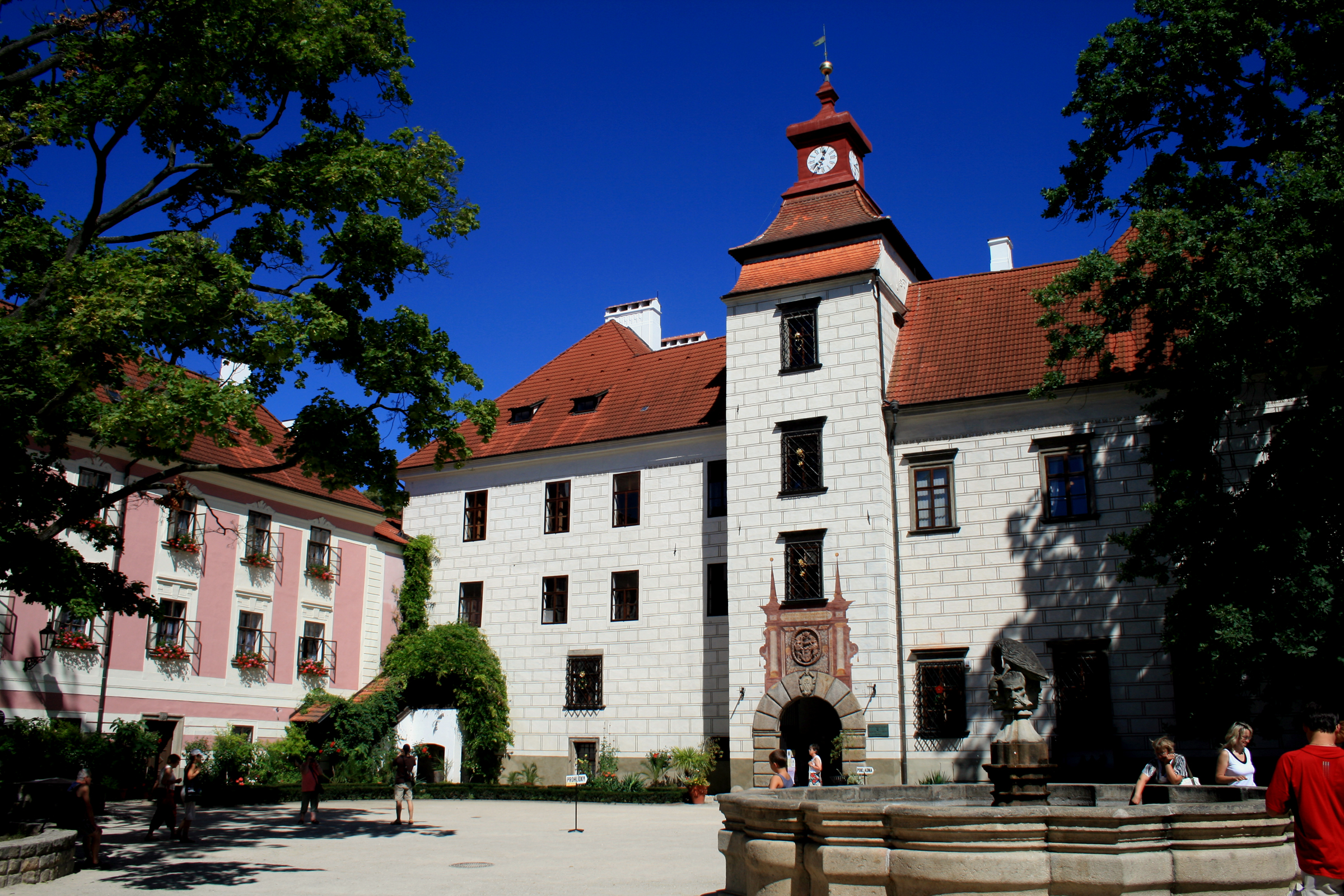
Třeboň Castle

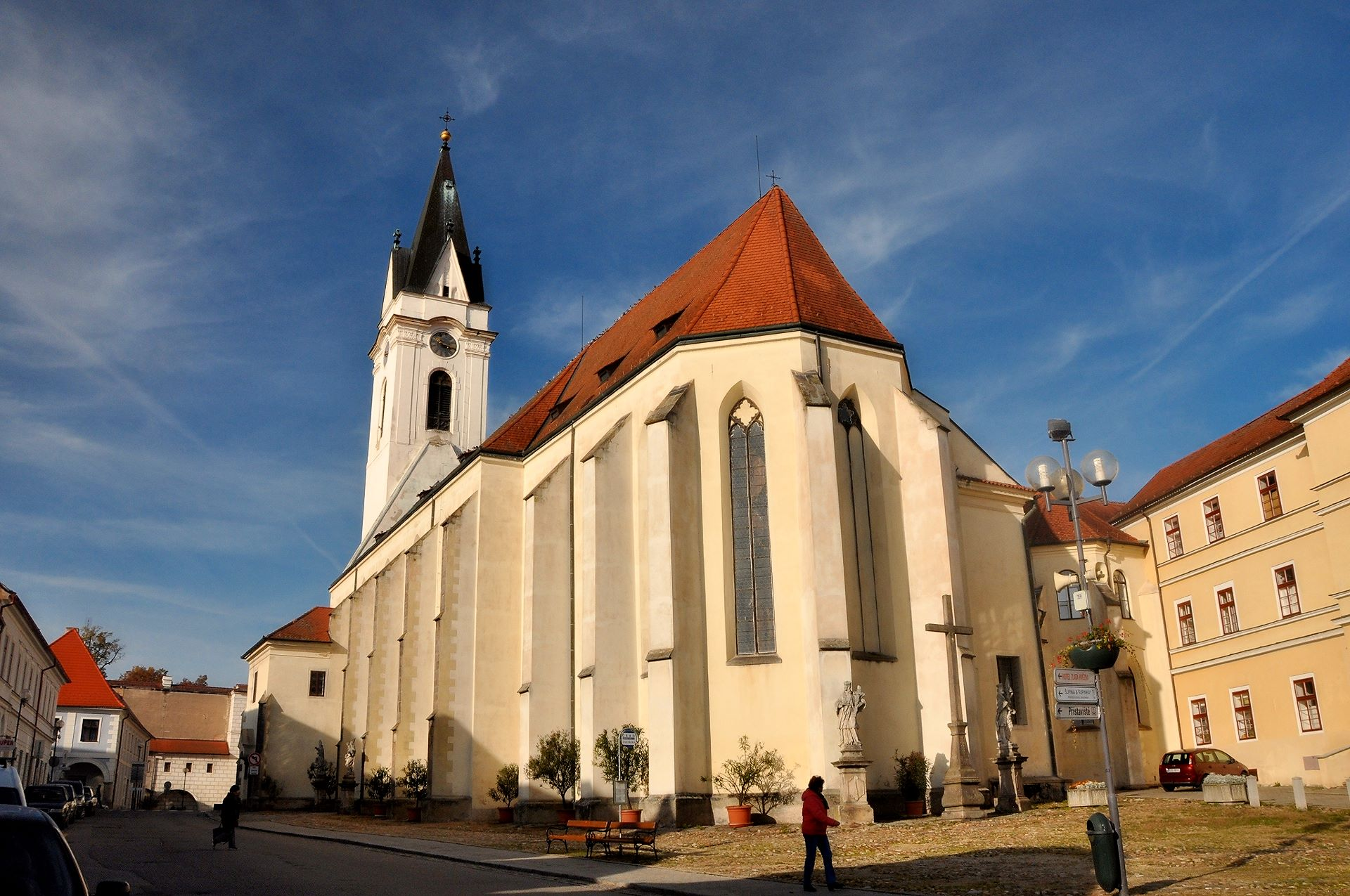
Church of Our Lady Queen and Saint Giles

The natural centre of the town's historic core is the square Masarykovo náměstí. It is surrounded by burgher houses with Renaissance and Baroque facades. In the centre there are a Renaissance stone fountain from 1569, and a Baroque Marian column. The main landmark is the Old Town Hall, built in 1563. In 1638, a massive quadrangular 31 metres (102 ft) high tower was added to the town hall.

Třeboň Castle is a Renaissance castle. A small stone castle in Třeboň was first mentioned in 1374. The current castle was created in 1565–1575 by reconstruction of the old castle buildings damaged by fire. The castle includes an English-style park.

The Church of Our Lady Queen and Saint Giles is the largest building in the complex of the former Augustinian monastery. The monastery was founded in 1367 by the Rosenberg family and construction of the church began the same year. The monastery was abolished in 1785.

The entrance to the town was guarded by massive gates, which are together with the fragments of the town walls preserved to this day.

== Notable people ==
- Master of the Třeboň Altarpiece, 14th-century painter
- Josef Triebensee (1772–1846), Czech-Austrian composer and oboist
- Karel Čurda (1911–1947), Nazi collaborationist
- Erwin Scharf (1914–1994), Austrian politician
- Karel Mejta Sr. (1928–2015), rower, Olympic winner
- Stanislav Lusk (1931–1987), rower, Olympic winner
- Jan Jindra (1932–2021), rower, Olympic winner
- Karel Poborský (born 1972), footballer
- Iveta Lutovská (born 1983), TV host, model and beauty pageant titleholder

John Dee and Edward Kelley held a number of seances and conducted alchemical experiments in Třeboň in 1586–1589.

== Twin towns – sister cities ==
Třeboň is twinned with:

- Freyung-Grafenau (district), Germany
- Interlaken, Switzerland
- Schrems, Austria
- Utena, Lithuania
