= Fishponds of the Třeboň Basin =

Artificial lakes of the Czech Republic

Fishponds of the Třeboň Basin Třeboň fishpond system
- Fish ponds
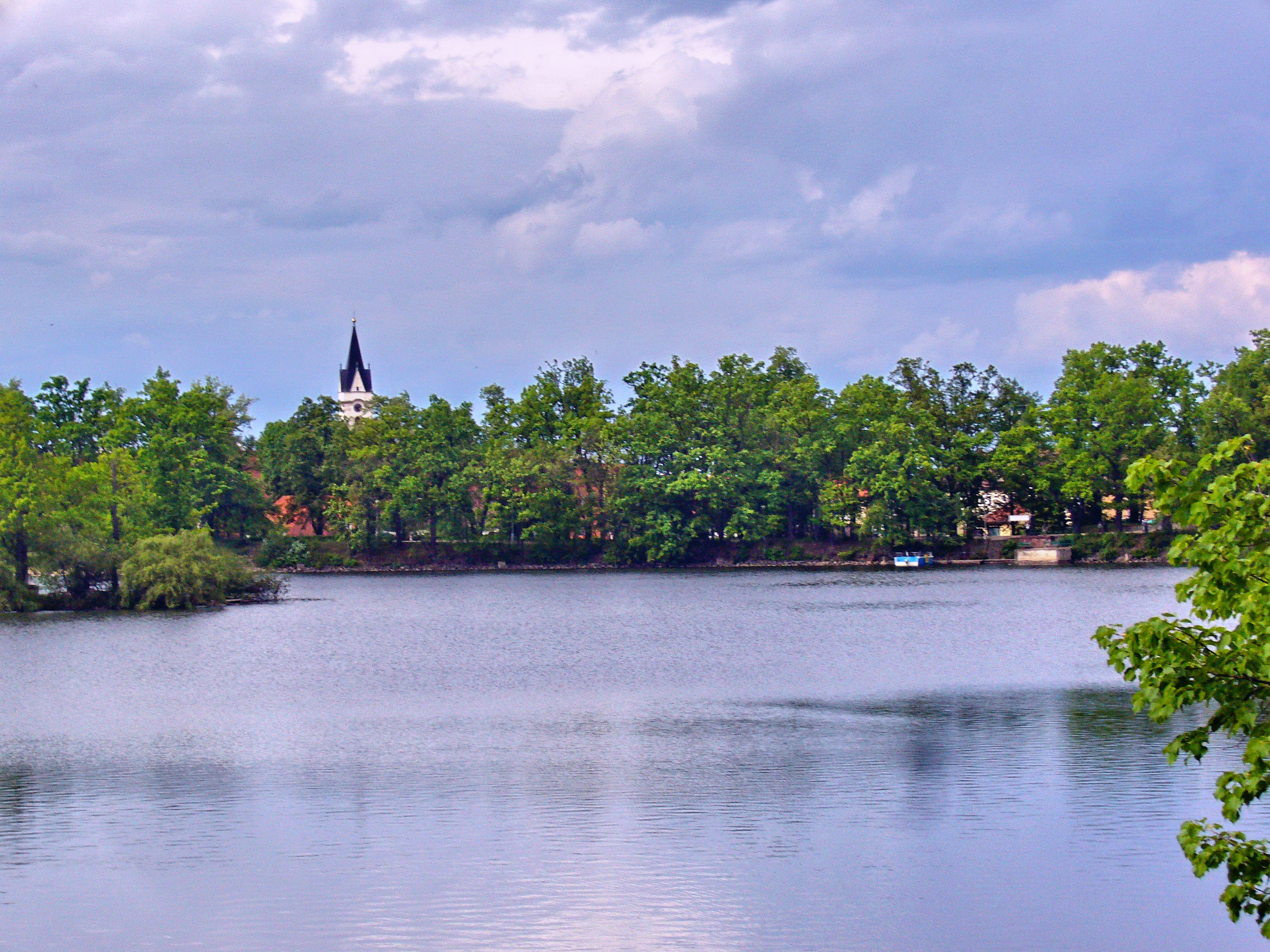
- The town of Třeboň seen over the Svět pond
- Interactive map of Fishponds of the Třeboň Basin
- Coordinates: 49°4′N 14°43′E
- Location: South Bohemian Region, Czech Republic
- Elevation: 410–450 m (1,350–1,480 ft)

The fishponds of the Třeboň Basin or Třeboň fishpond system (Czech: Třeboňská rybniční soustava) are a collection of over five hundred fish ponds. They were constructed from the 13th century onwards in the Třeboň Basin area of Bohemia, now the South Bohemian Region of the Czech Republic, with most work occurring between the 15th and 16th centuries, and collectively cover approximately 6,370 hectares (15,700 acres). The individual ponds vary significantly in size, and are connected by a labyrinth of canals, ditches, and streams.

They continue to be used for aquaculture, in addition to flood management, recreation, and biodiversity protection and are currently listed on the UNESCO World Heritage Tentative List as a significant Czech cultural site, but no decision has been made for their inclusion.

== History ==
Fish ponds are first recorded to have existed within Bohemia in the 12th century, with a carp pond being described in the original 1115 Kladruby Monastery charter, but development within the Třeboň area did not begin until the 13th century when Slavs from central Bohemia arrived in the region. This initial construction had the primary intent of draining the area, particularly swamps which had expanded due to deforestation, in order to make available additional arable land, with aquaculture being a secondary goal.

This process was initially slow, but it intensified from the late 14th century, when the Holy Roman Emperor Charles IV commanded the construction of fishponds "so that the kingdom would abound in fish and mist". The ponds resulting from this were often constructed in the spirit of civic competition and were of significant value; a large, 260-hectare (640-acre) pond was considered as valuable as three villages, counting the land and inhabitants. It further intensified during the 15th and 16th centuries when the fish trade was one of the most profitable farming activities in the area.

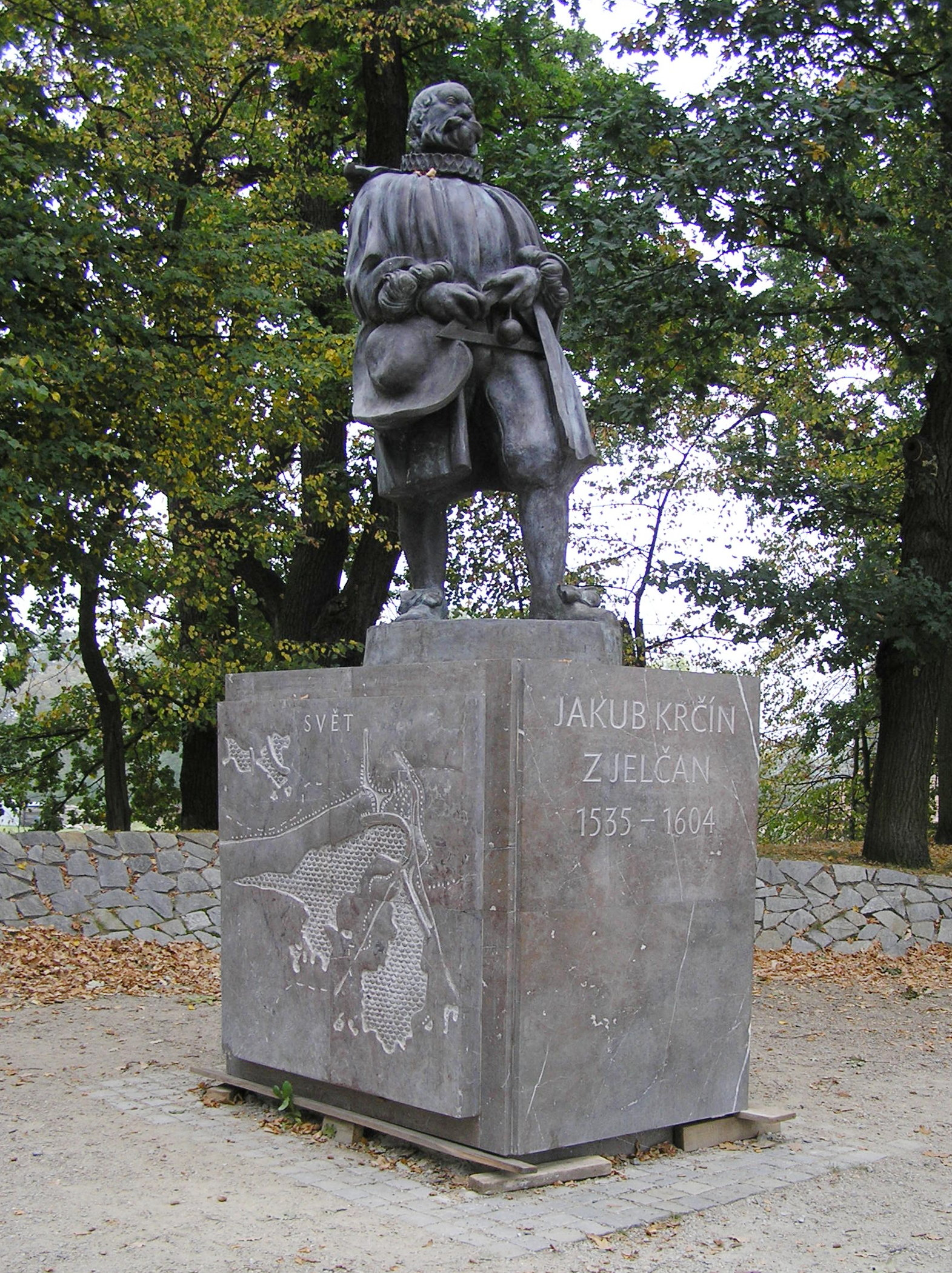
Statue of Jakub Krčín, standing on the dam of the Svět Pond

This period of intensification culminated under Štěpánek Netolický; in 1506 he submitted plans, now lost, for the construction of the 48-kilometre (30 mi) long Zlatá stoka canal, which would supply the entire basin with water and enable ponds to be maintained during periods of drought. Construction on it began in 1508 and was completed at some point between 1518 and 1520. While the canal was under construction, he further contributed to the intensification by developing a pond construction system that was used in the construction or expansion of a number of large ponds and resulted in the first major expansion of the Třeboň Basin ponds.

The next major period of development occurred in the late 16th century under Jakub Krčín working for the prominent Bohemian Rosenberg family. Under his direction, many ponds were restored or constructed, including, as a consequence of his construction of a dam on the Lužnice, the Rožmberk Pond which covers 4.89 square kilometres (1.89 sq mi) and is the largest pond in central Europe. Other work conducted under his direction include a canal connecting the Nežárka with the Lužnice called Nová řeka.

Following this development in 1607 the fish-harvest was recorded as being 219 tonnes (241 short tons), but the Thirty Years' War had a significant negative effect on production, and by 1626 the harvest had fallen to just 48 tonnes (53 short tons). Recovery began in 1677, but the process was slow, hindered by a lack of fishermen and managers. This recovery is documented to have been complete by 1751, where a harvest of 260 tonnes (290 short tons) was recorded.

The final major development involved the construction of 36 new ponds under Josef Šusta, collectively covering 413 hectares (1,020 acres) and bringing the total area of the ponds to 6,370 hectares (15,700 acres) in 1908, a value which has changed little since.

The ponds are currently owned by Rybářství Třeboň a.s., having been owned by the House of Schwarzenberg until 1920, and currently produce approximately 2,900 tonnes (3,200 short tons) of fish per year, with the vast majority of this total being carp.

== Current uses ==
From their beginning as an effort to drain the swamps in order to obtain farm land, the ponds have served a wide variety of functions. Today, these include aquaculture, water management, biodiversity protection, and recreation.

=== Biodiversity ===
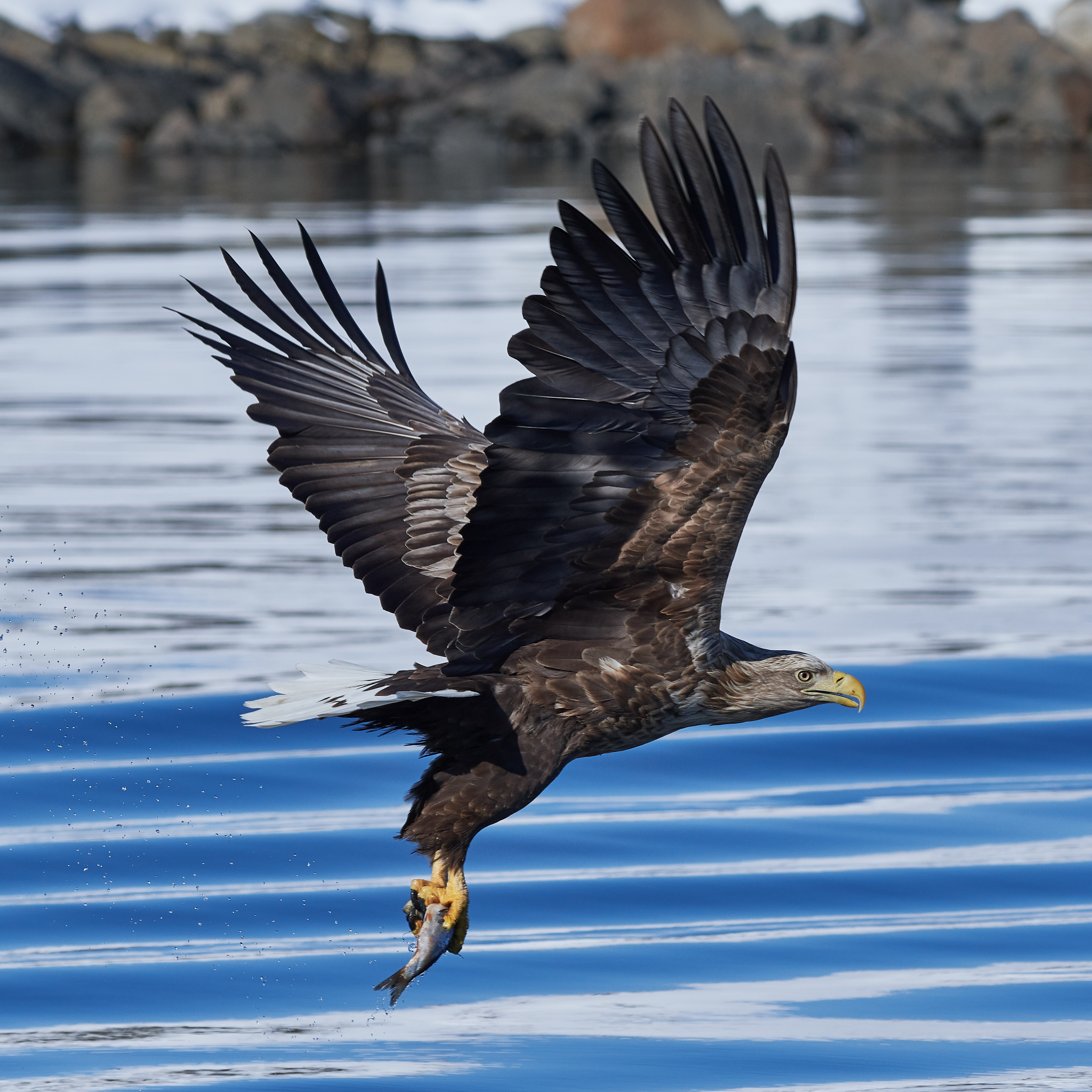
A white-tailed eagle, one of the species present in the basin

The ponds serve an important role in ensuring biodiversity, as while they are man-made, their age has resulted in a semi-natural environment, allowing them to function as a microcosm of much wider regions, with area similar to tundra being found in close proximity to coniferous forests, deciduous forests, wet meadows and more. This allows a wide variety of flora to flourish in the region, which in turn supports a rich collection of fauna including over 150 species of birds and over 50 species of mammals alongside other vertebrates and invertebrates.

However, this role is threatened by the intensified farming since the end of the Second World War; it has caused the destruction of some of these environments, and it has caused eutrophication throughout the region. These issues are exacerbated by the choice to harvest fish from April to June, as this coincides and disrupts the bird breeding season.

=== Water management ===
The broader fishpond system has a water catchment across the entirety of the Lužnice River, including both the Czech and Austrian portions, resulting in a total catchment size of 1,700 square kilometres (660 sq mi), and when this region experiences floods the ponds perform a secondary function of water management during floods.

The fishponds have a water retention capacity of at least 52 million cubic metres (1.8 billion cubic feet), and so function as a buffer during flooding, incidents the region suffers sporadically from; floods impacting the fishponds were recorded as early as 1586, and more recently in 2002 and 2006. However, this ability to protect downstream communities is degraded by the comparatively low-quality construction of the dams and dykes that make up the ponds; they are typically constructed from locally sourced homogenous earth resulting in significant seepage. Meanwhile many of the drainage pipes, though they have been replaced over the years, are still wooden pipes that were installed in the 19th century, which sometimes results in a washout of material from the dam, resulting in large cavities which significantly impair water retention.

== UNESCO status ==
The ponds are proposed for inclusion in UNESCO World Heritage sites, while the Basin area has been listed as a UNESCO Biosphere Reserve since 1977. In 1990, many of the ponds were listed as Wetlands of International Importance per the Ramsar Convention and now make up approximately 70% of the ponds so classified, while in 1993 1,080 hectares (2,700 acres) of the peat-bogs were registered as being of international importance.

== See also ==
- List of ponds of the Czech Republic
