= Josef Štěpánek Netolický =

Josef Štěpánek Netolický (c. 1460–1538/1539) was a Czech fishpond builder and architect.

Netolický worked as a regent of the Rosenberg estate and designed a fishpond system the Třeboň Basin in southern Bohemia, around the town of Třeboň. His successor was the other well-known regent of this estate, Jakub Krčín. Netolický was a founder of the Zlatá Stoka (Golden Canal), one of two canals for regulation of water system in the region of Třeboň. He also worked on Třeboň's walls. House in which he lived (No. 89) still stands on the main town square.
