= Erwin Scharf (politician) =

Austrian politician

Erwin Scharf (29 August 1914 in Wittingau – 6 September 1994 in Vienna) was an Austrian politician. During World War II, he was a partisan fighter in the Freedom Battalions in Yugoslavia. He then became the central secretary of the SPÖ. He was also involved in the Revolutionary Socialists.

In the beginning of the post-war era he objected to the pact between SPÖ and ÖVP, and favoured an alliance with the KPÖ. He was eventually expelled from the SPÖ, and joined the KPÖ where he would become a politburo member.
