= Josef Šusta =

Czech aquaculturist (1835–1914)

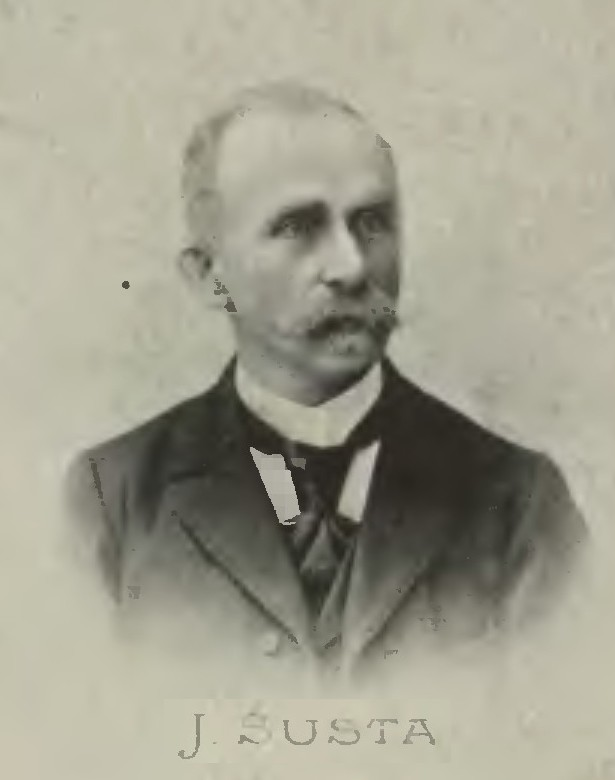
- Josef Šusta, depicted in 1899
- Born: 26 November 1835; Jankov, Austrian Empire
- Died: 15 November 1914 (aged 78); Prague, Austria-Hungary
- Resting place: Malvazinky Cemetery
- Occupation: Aquaculturist
- Writing career
- Notable works: On Nutrition of the Carp and its Fishpond Associates; 500 years of fishpond management in the Třeboň area

Josef Šusta (26 November 1835 – 15 November 1914) was a Czech aquaculturist and is considered to be among the modern "fathers" of the practice. He is notable for having written the 1884 book "On Nutrition of the Carp and its Fishpond Associates", as well as, alongside Antonín Frič and Josef Kafka, revitalizing the aquaculture industry in the Třeboň Basin by increasing pond productivity.

== Works ==
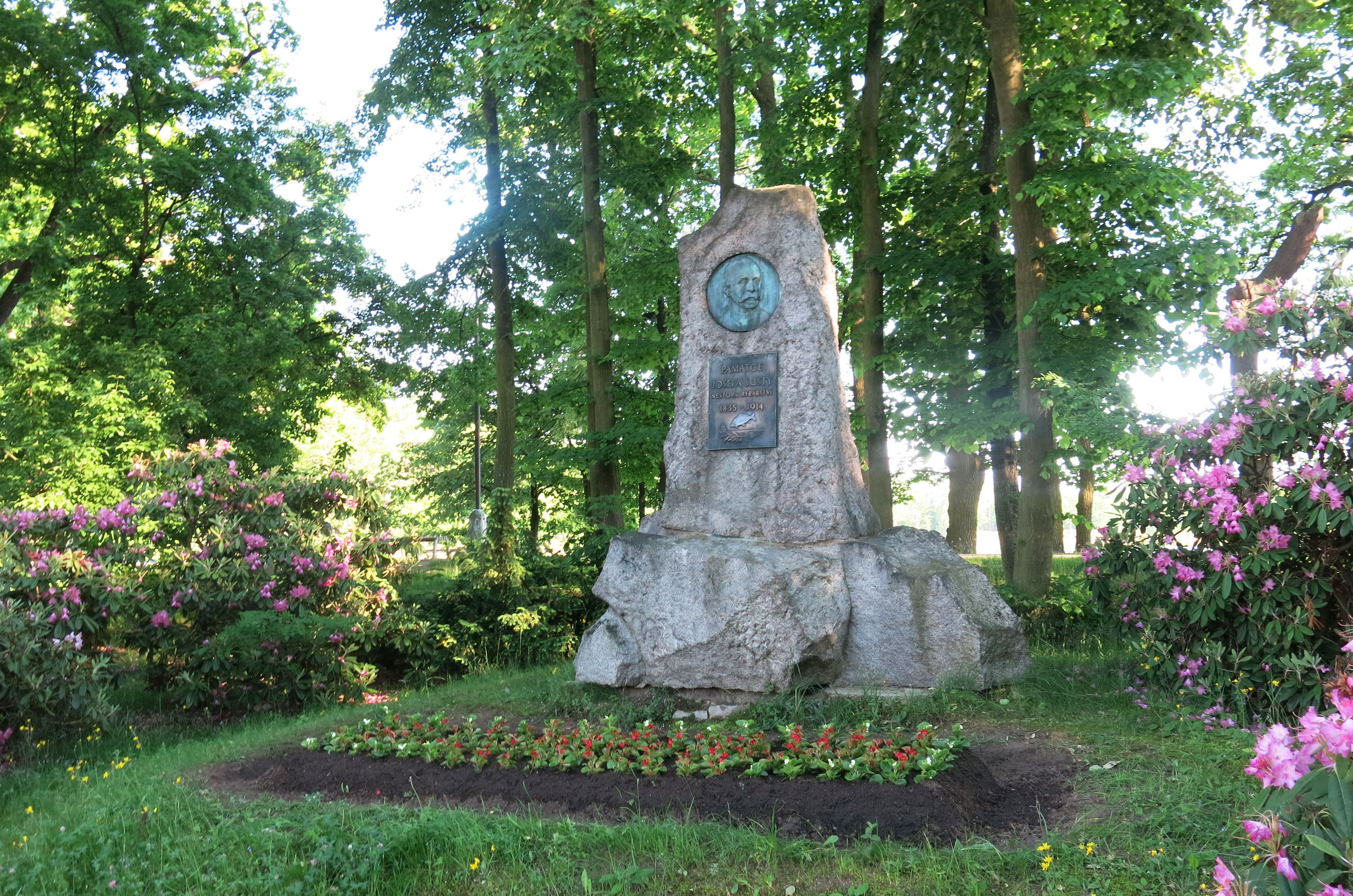
Monument to Josef Šusta at the Svět pond

- Výživa kapra a jeho družiny rybničné, 1884
- Fünf Jahrhunderte der Teichwirtschaft zu Wittingau (Pět století rybničního hospodářství v Třeboni), 1889
- Hospodářsko-rybářská těžba v rybnících (1868)
