= Křepenice =

- Municipality
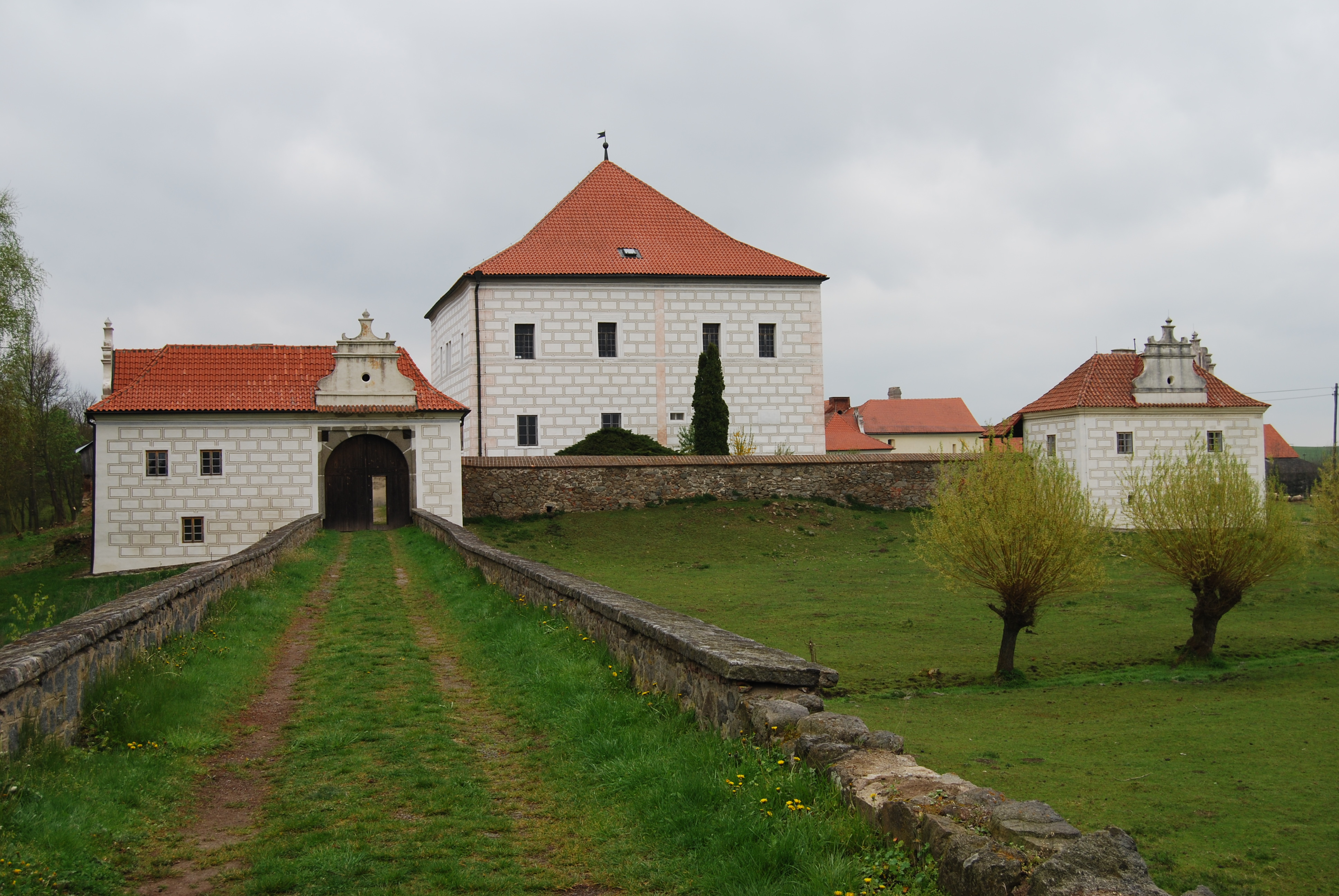
- Křepenice Fort

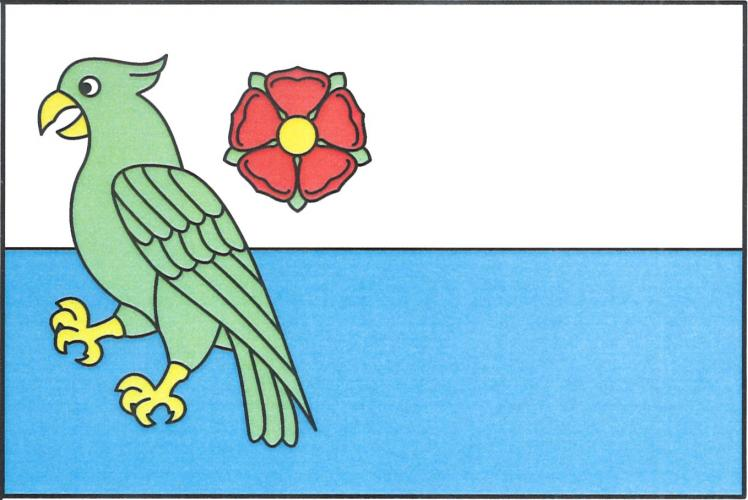
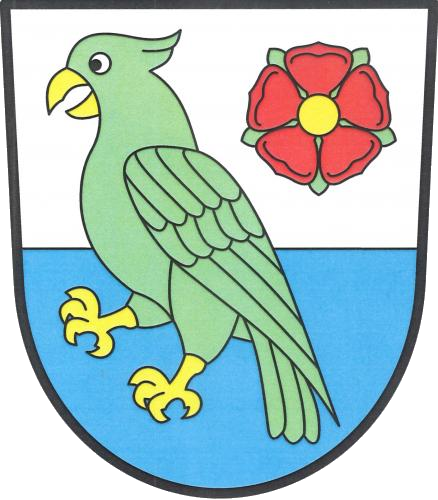
- Flag Coat of arms

- Location in the Czech Republic
- Coordinates: 49°42′11″N 14°20′51″E
- Country: Czech Republic
- Region: Central Bohemian
- District: Příbram
- First mentioned: 1045

Area
  - Total: 7.20 km^{2} (2.78 sq mi)
- Elevation: 355 m (1,165 ft)

Population (2026-01-01)
  - Total: 212
  - Density: 29.4/km^{2} (76.3/sq mi)
- Time zone: UTC+1 (CET)
  - Summer (DST): UTC+2 (CEST)
- Postal code: 264 01
- Website: krepenice-obec.cz

Křepenice is a municipality and village in Příbram District in the Central Bohemian Region of the Czech Republic. It has about 200 inhabitants.

== History ==
The first written mention of Křepenice is from 1045.

== Demographics ==
Historical population
Year	Pop.	±%
1869	316	—
1880	376	+19.0%
1890	350	−6.9%
1900	312	−10.9%
1910	304	−2.6%
1921	307	+1.0%
1930	313	+2.0%
1950	279	−10.9%
1961	284	+1.8%
1970	283	−0.4%
1980	219	−22.6%
1991	201	−8.2%
2001	166	−17.4%
2011	153	−7.8%
2021	192	+25.5%
Source: Censuses
