= Rožmberk Pond =

Pond in South Bohemian Region, Czech Republic

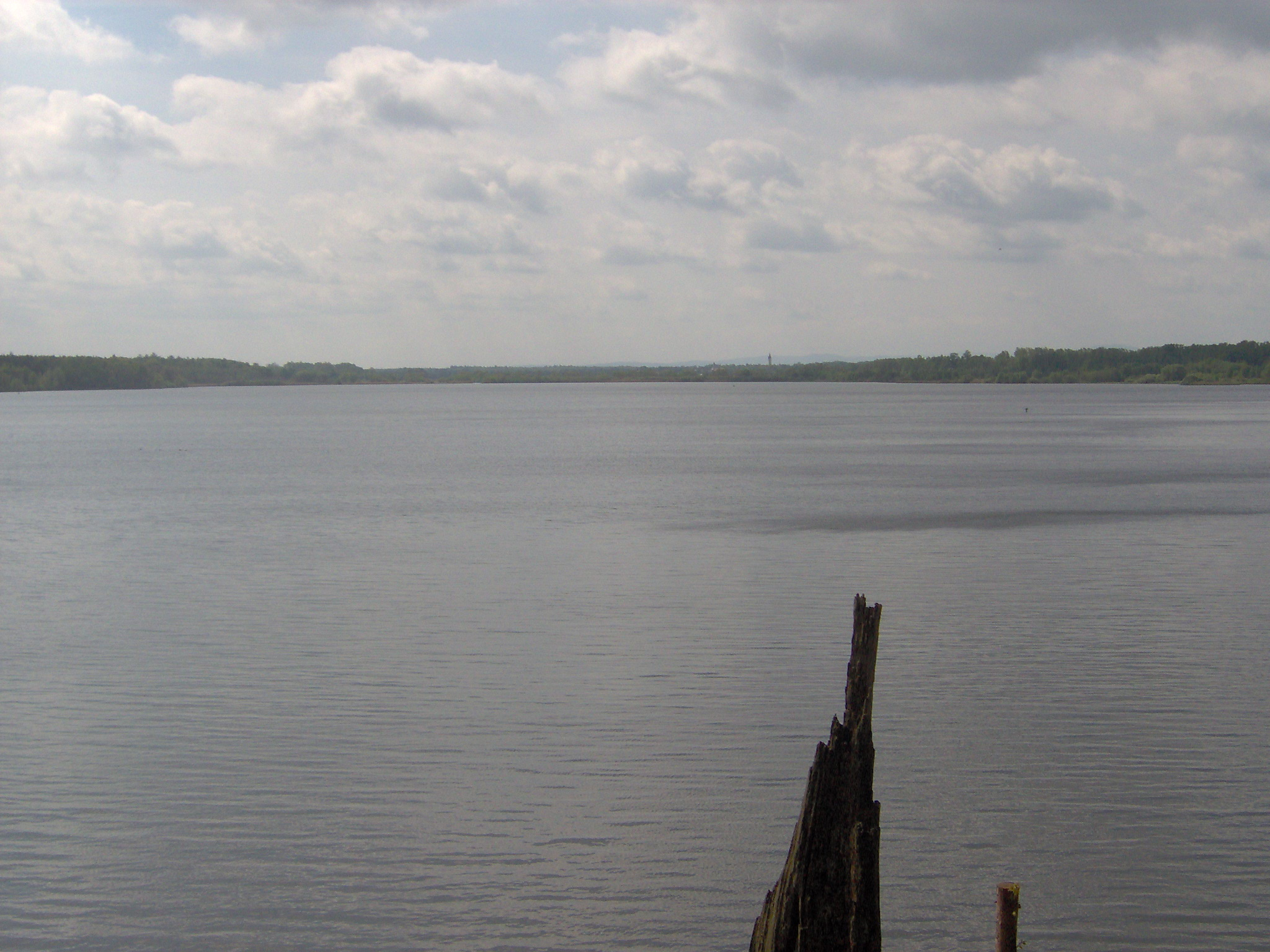

- Location within Czech Republic
- Location: Třeboň, South Bohemian Region
- Coordinates: 49°2′31″N 14°46′32″E
- Type: fish pond
- Basin countries: Czech Republic
- Surface area: 4.89 km^{2} (1.89 sq mi)
- Max. depth: 6.2 m (20 ft)
- Water volume: 6,200,000 m^{3} (8,100,000 cu yd)
- Surface elevation: 427 m (1,401 ft)

Rožmberk is a fish pond in the South Bohemian Region of the Czech Republic. It was founded at the end of the 16th century and is part of the Třeboň fishpond system. With an area of 4.89 km^{2} (1.89 sq mi), it is the largest fish pond in the world.

== Geography and parametres ==
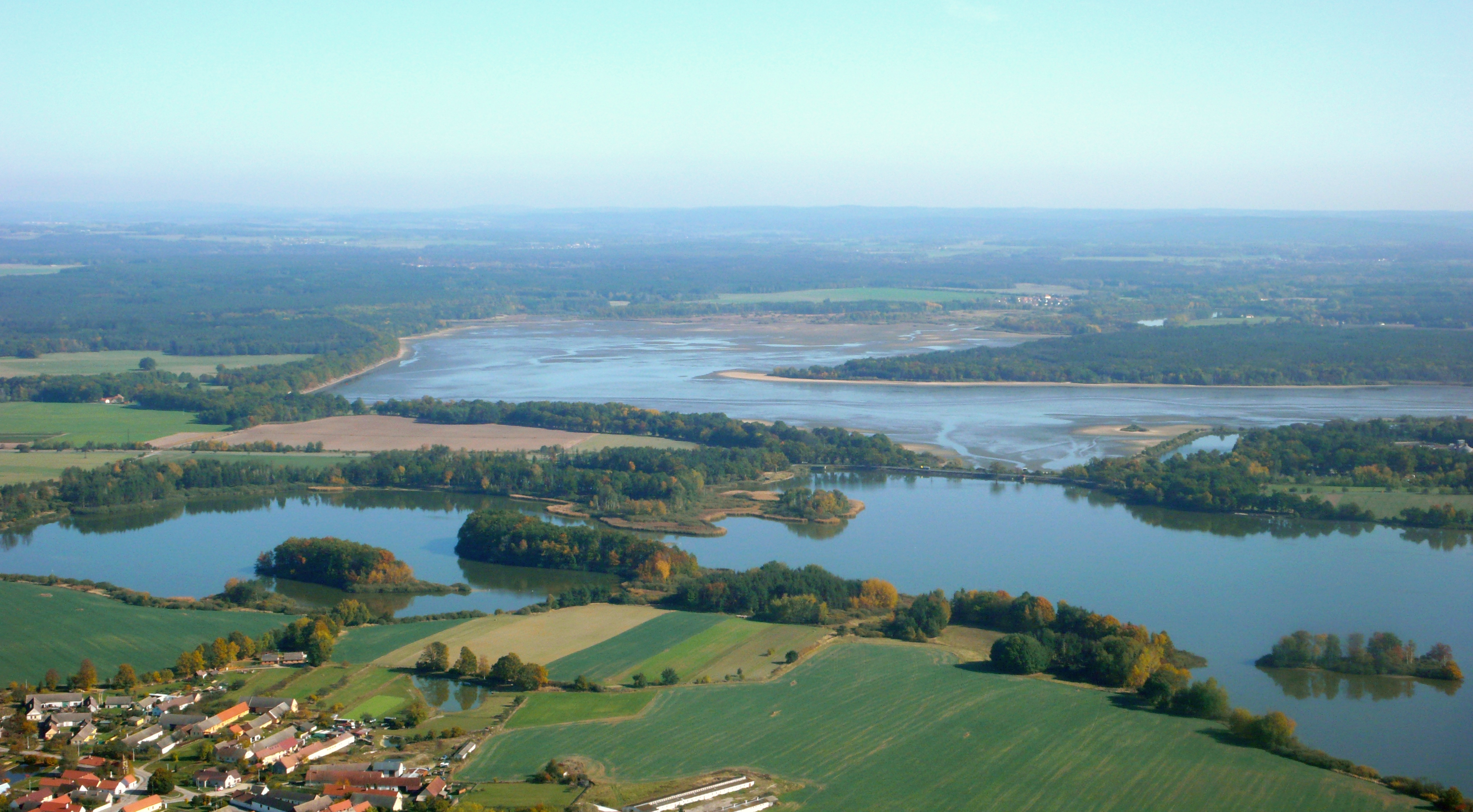
Rožmberk and Káňov ponds

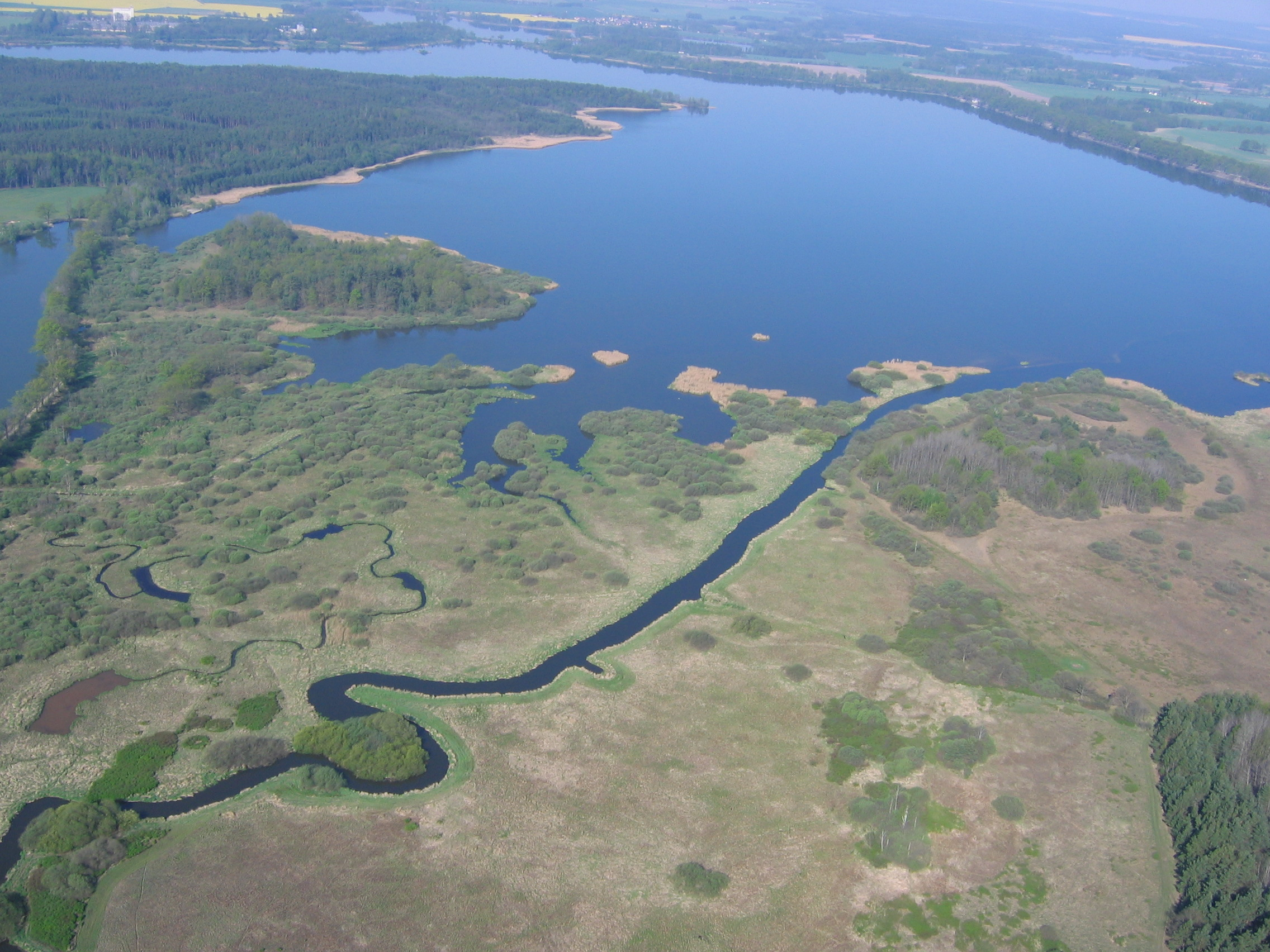
Lužnice River flowing to the pond

Rožmberk is located in the South Bohemian Region, about 22 km (14 mi) east of České Budějovice and next to the town of Třeboň. It is part of the Třeboň fishpond system, which is a set of several hundred fish ponds. It was built as a reservoir on the Lužnice River, whose natural flow continues beyond the dam. The artificially created channel Zlatá stoka also passes through the pond.

The so-called economic area of the pond (the area it occupies under standard conditions) is 4.89 km^{2} (1.89 sq mi), and it has a maximum depth is 6.2 m (20 ft). The cadastral area of the pond is 6.47 km^{2} (2.50 sq mi). The difference between the economic and cadastral area is the area where the water spills when the standard level rises.

The dam is 2,355 m (7,726 ft) long and dams the valley floodplain of the Lužnice River. The dam is filled with local materials. At its widest point, it is 55–60 m wide at the base of the dam. It is up to 12 m at the dam's crown. The height of the dam is 11 m.

== History ==
The pond was designed and built under the guidance of Jakub Krčín, working for the Bohemian aristocratic Rosenberg family (Czech: Rožmberk) and it is named after that family. In the 16th century, many fish ponds were established throughout South Bohemia, and there are several other large ponds in the vicinity of Rožmberk Pond, including Velký Tisý rybník, Svět and Opatovický rybník.

At the time of creation of Rožmberk Pond, its main task was to regulate the frequent floods caused by the Lužnice. The work started in 1584 and was finished in 1590. The original area was allegedly 1,050 ha (2,600 acres) and the volume was up to 50 million m^{3} (1.8 billion cu ft). The current main outlet was built in 1916–1918 on the site of the original outlet.

== Use ==
The pond is primarily used for fish farming. It is the largest in the world in the category of artificially created bodies of water intended primarily for fish farming. The pond is owned by the Rybářství Třeboň a.s. company, which is the largest producer of freshwater fish in Europe. The largest volume of farmed fish is Eurasian carp. Other farmed fish species are zander, catfish, tench, pike, grass carp, silver carp, common bream and perch.

In the right front part of the outlet there is an intake for a small hydroelectric power plant.

== Protection of nature ==
The pond is situated within the Třeboň Protected Landscape Area. In addition, the eastern part of the pond and its shore, including part of the flow of the Lužnice River, is protected as the Výtopa Rožmberku Nature Reserve. It has an area of 205.6 ha (508 acres). The object of protection is an extensive complex of littoral vegetation of the pond and adjacent wet meadows with many valuable wetland communities and a number of protected and endangered taxa.

== See also ==
- List of ponds of the Czech Republic
