= Třeboň Basin =

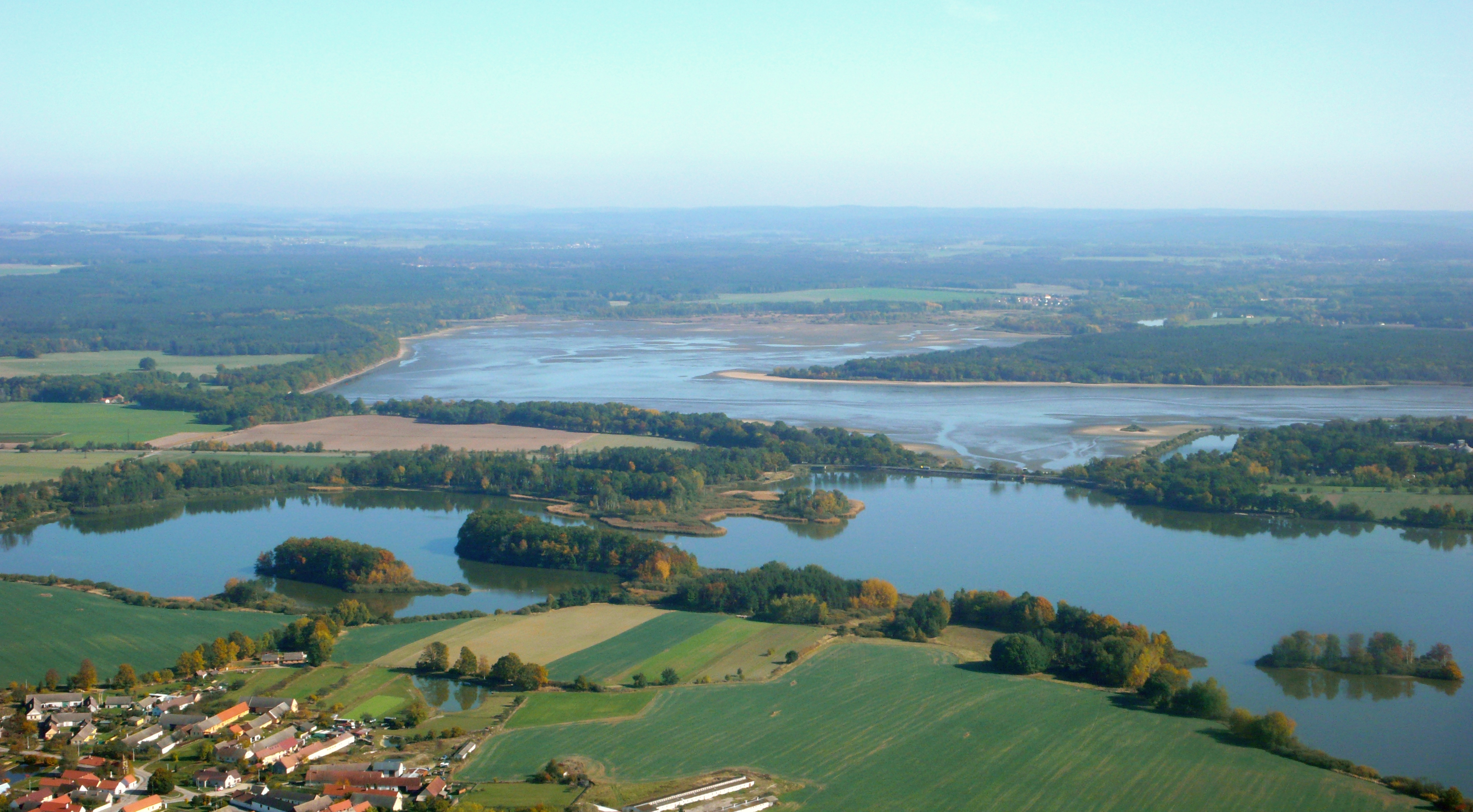
- Rožmberk and Káňov ponds

Highest point
- Peak: Baba
- Elevation: 583 m (1,913 ft)

Dimensions
- Area: 1,360 km^{2} (530 mi^{2})

Geography
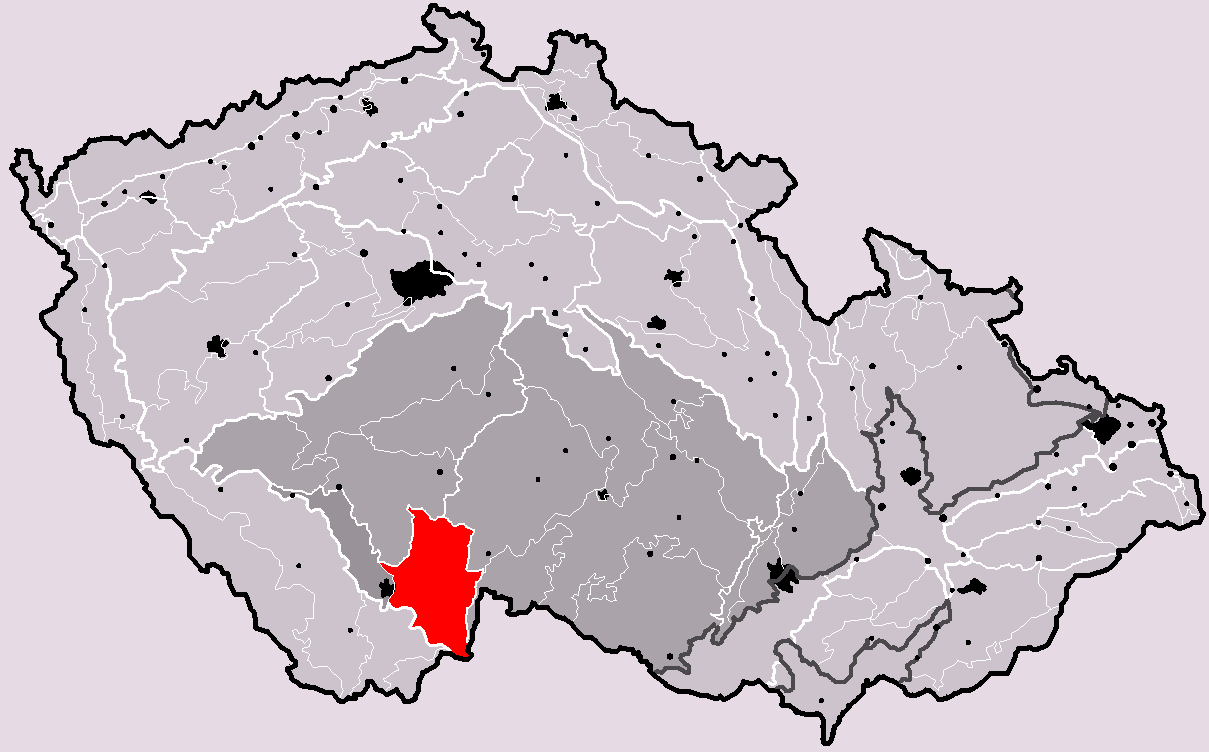
- Třeboň Basin in the geomorphological system of the Czech Republic
- Country: Czech Republic
- Regions: South Bohemian
- Range coordinates: 49°0′N 14°45′E
- Parent range: South Bohemian Basins

The Třeboň Basin (Czech: Třeboňská pánev) is a structural basin and geomorphological mesoregion of the Czech Republic. It is located in the South Bohemian Region and it is named after the town of Třeboň. It is known for its fishpond system.

== Geomorphology ==
The Třeboň Basin is one of the mesoregions of the South Bohemian Basins (the second being the České Budějovice Basin) within the Bohemian Massif. It is further subdivided into the microregions of Lišov Threshold, Lomnice Basin and Kardašova Řečice Uplands.

Relief varies across the territory. In the middle the relief is flat, in the east there is a flat hilly relief, and in the west there is an asymmetrical ridge with a rugged hilly relief.

The highest part of the territory is the western part, in Lišov Threshold, where altitudes are above 500 metres (1,600 ft). There is also the highest peak of the territory, Baba at 583 metres (1,913 ft) above sea level.

== Geology ==
The Třeboň Basin was tectonically formed during the Cretaceous. It is filled with sediments from the Late Cretaceous and Neogene periods, in the west there are sediments from the Permian period, on the edge there is a Moldanubicum.

== Geography ==
The Třeboň Basin has an area of 1,360 km^{2} (530 sq mi) and an average elevation of 457 m (1,499 ft). The territory has a slightly elongated shape from north to south and stretches from the town of Soběslav in the north to the Czech–Austrian border in the south. The border passes around České Budějovice in the west and Jindřichův Hradec in the east, both cities are already outside the territory.

The area is densely interwoven with many watercourses. The largest rivers are Lužnice and Nežárka. Part of the territory also belongs to the Vltava river basin. The Vltava briefly crosses the west of the territory.

Despite the area, there are no larger settlements, and the territory is sparsely populated. The largest towns in the Třeboň Basin are Třeboň, Veselí nad Lužnicí, Lišov, Suchdol nad Lužnicí and České Velenice.

=== Ponds ===
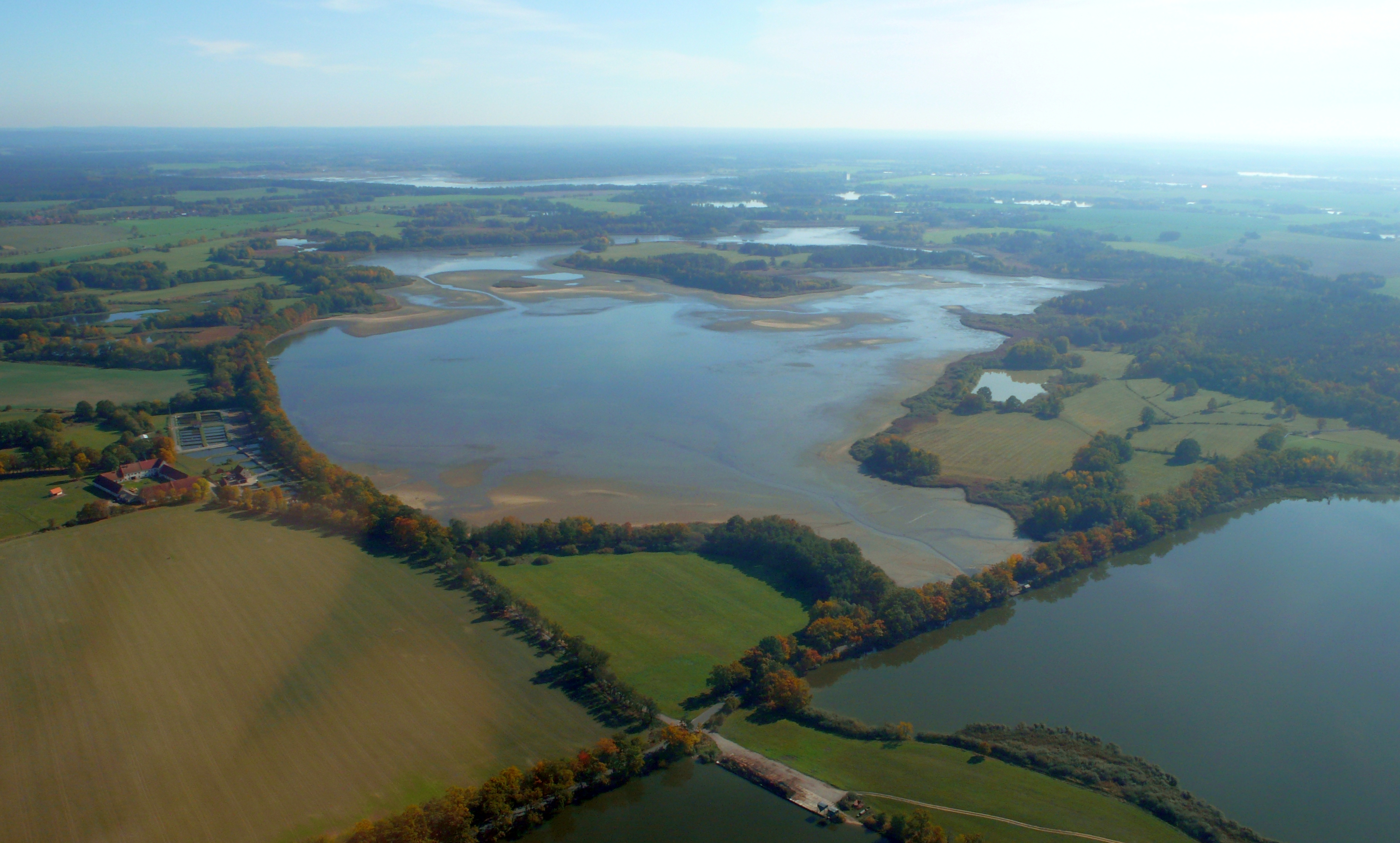
Koclířov and Velký Tisý rybník ponds

The Třeboň Basin is known for its fish ponds, which were established in the region since Middle Ages. There are the largest ponds in the Czech Republic, including Rožmberk, Horusický rybník, Dvořiště, Velký Tisý rybník and Záblatský rybník. Rožmberk Pond is the largest pond in the country and the largest fish pond in the world with surface area of 489 hectares (1,210 acres). It was built between 1584 and 1590.

== Nature ==
A large part of the basin (about 700 km^{2} (270 sq mi)) is protected as the Třeboňsko Protected Landscape Area. Since 1977, Třeboňsko also has been one of six Czech UNESCO MAB biospheric reserves.

== Gallery ==
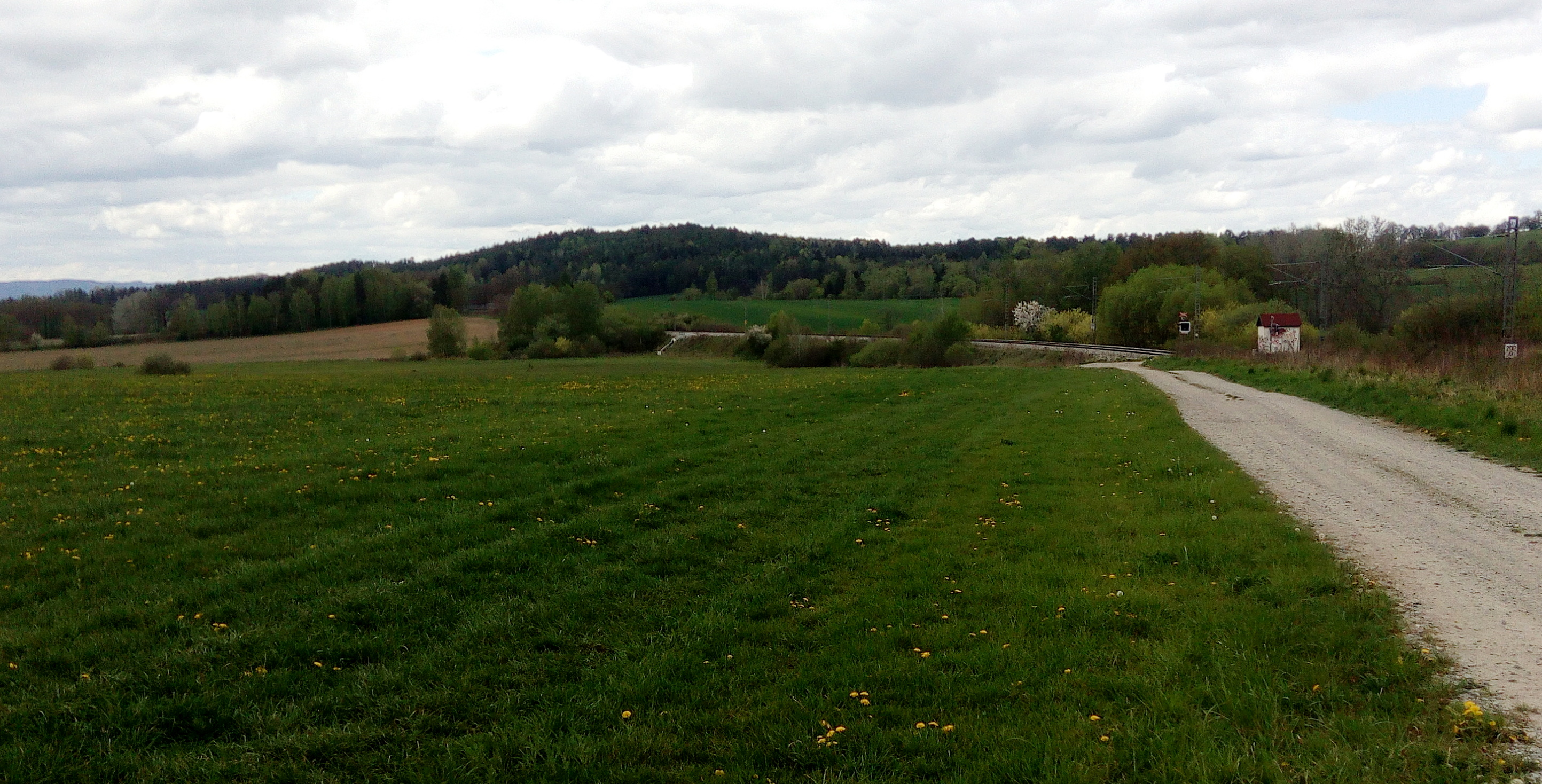
Chlumek hill near Nová Ves

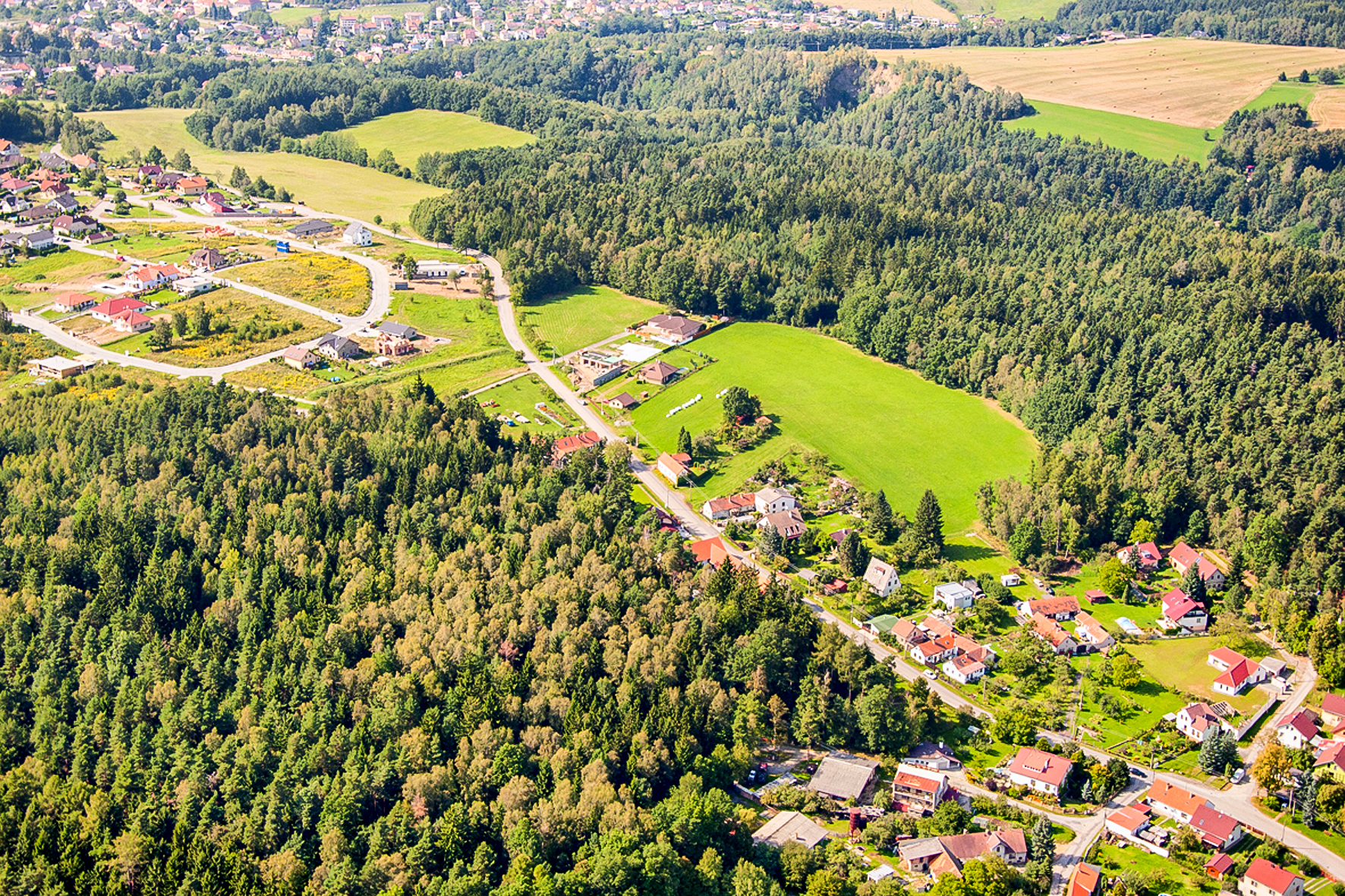
Aerial view of Hlincová Hora

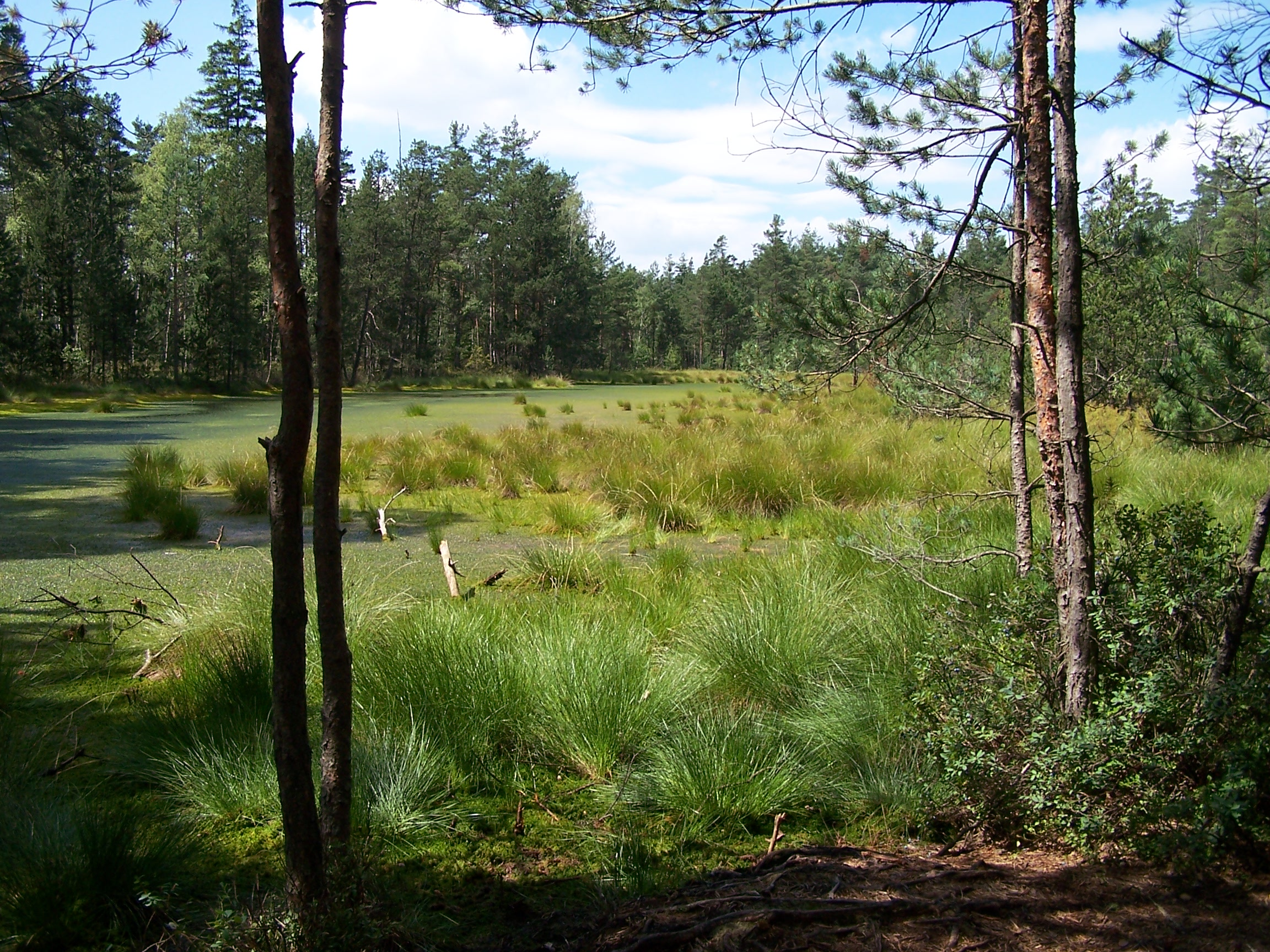
Červené blato National Nature Reserve with excavated peat bog

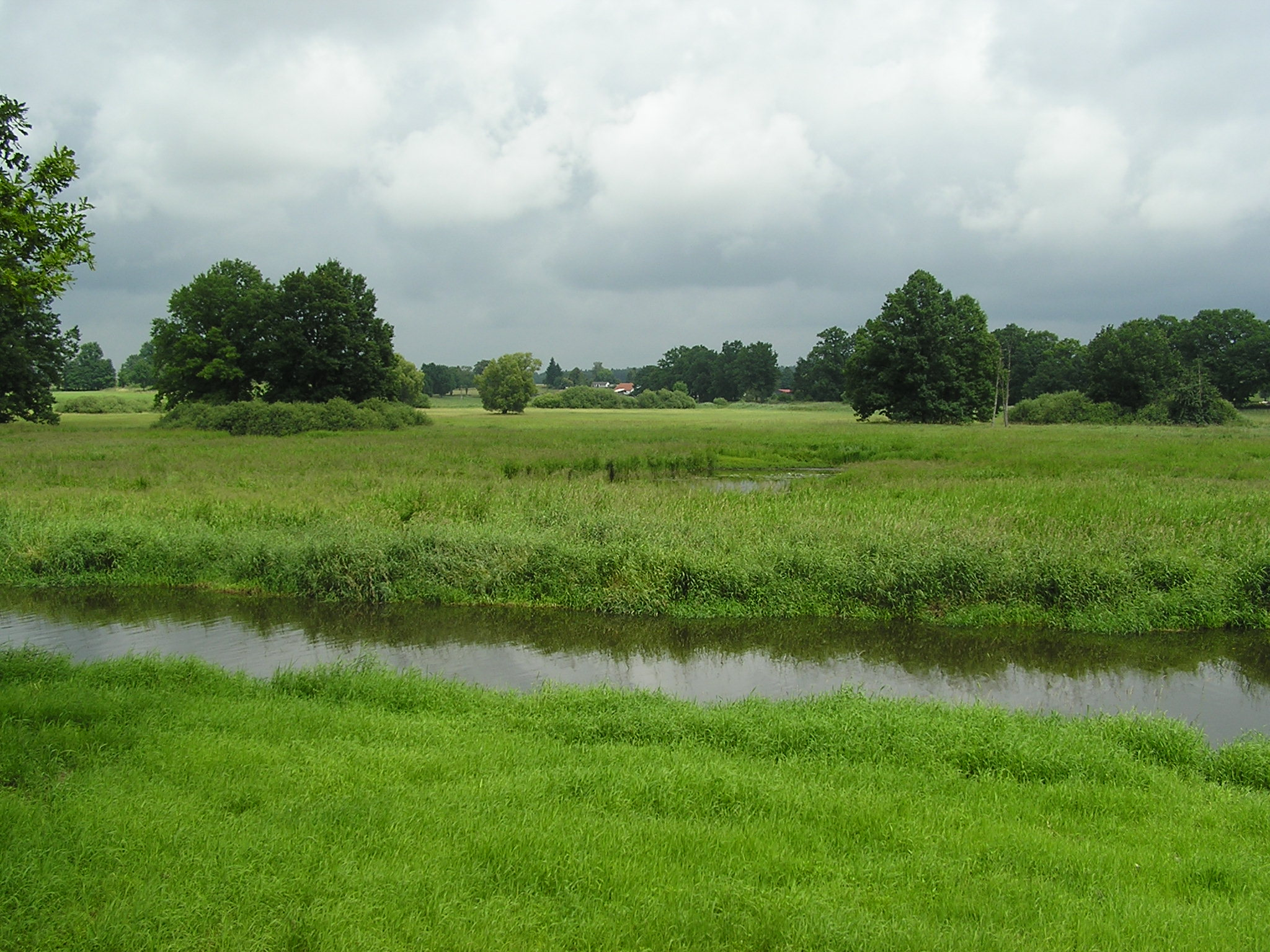
Novořecké močály Nature Reserve
