= List of ponds of the Czech Republic =

This is a list of ponds (fish ponds) in the Czech Republic, greater than 150 ha, sorted by area.

Pond	District	Surface area ha	Deep m	Altitude	River (Drainage basin)
Rožmberk	Jindřichův Hradec	489	6.2	427	Lužnice & Potěšilka
Horusický rybník	Tábor	415	6.0	416	Zlatá stoka (Lužnice)
Bezdrev	České Budějovice	365	7.0	381	Bezdrevský potok
Dvořiště	České Budějovice	337	4.5	437	Zlatá stoka (Lužnice)
Žehuňský rybník	Nymburk	321	6.0	204	Cidlina
Velký Tisý	Jindřichův Hradec	317	3.4	421	Zlatá stoka (Lužnice)
Záblatský rybník	Jindřichův Hradec	305	3.0	427	Zlatá stoka (Lužnice)
Nesyt	Břeclav	296	3.0	175	Včelínek (Thaya)
Lake Mácha	Česká Lípa	284	12.0	266	Robečský potok (Ploučnice)
Dehtář	České Budějovice	246	6.0	406	Dehtářský potok (Vltava)
Velká Holná	Jindřichův Hradec	230	3.0	453	Holenský potok (Nežárka)
Velké Dářko	Žďár nad Sázavou	205	3.0	614	Sázava
Svět	Jindřichův Hradec	201	3.0	436	Spolský potok (Lužnice)
Staňkovský rybník	Jindřichův Hradec	197	8.5	469	Koštěnický potok
Koclířov	Jindřichův Hradec	192	?	?	Zlatá stoka (Lužnice)
Kačležský rybník	Jindřichův Hradec	181	2.0	530	Koštěnický potok
Novoveský rybník	Brno-Country	174	2.0	178	Olbramovický potok (Jihlava)
Opatovický rybník	Jindřichův Hradec	161	3.0	436	Zlatá stoka (Lužnice)
Bohdanečský rybník	Pardubice	160	2.0	218	Opatovický kanál (Elbe)
Vrkoč	Brno-Country	156	2.0	173	Mlýnský náhon (Jihlava)

== See also ==
- List of dams and reservoirs in the Czech Republic
- List of lakes of the Czech Republic
- List of rivers of the Czech Republic
