= Lužnice =

Lužnice may refer to places:

- Lužnice (river), Czech Republic and Austria
- Lužnice, Kragujevac, a settlement in Serbia
- Lužnice (Jindřichův Hradec District), a municipality and village, Czech Republic
- Lužnice, a hamlet and part of Pohorská Ves, Czech Republic
