= Suchdol =

Suchdol may refer to places in the Czech Republic:

- Suchdol (Kutná Hora District), a market town in the Central Bohemian Region
- Suchdol (Prostějov District), a municipality and village in the Olomouc Region
- Suchdol (Prague), a district of Prague
- Suchdol nad Lužnicí, a town in the South Bohemian Region
- Suchdol nad Odrou, a market town in the Moravian-Silesian Region
- Suchdol, a village and part of Bujanov in the South Bohemian Region
- Suchdol, a village and part of Křimov in the Ústí nad Labem Region
- Suchdol, a village and part of Kunžak in the South Bohemian Region
- Suchdol, a village and part of Prosenická Lhota in the Central Bohemian Region
- Suchdol, a village and part of Vavřinec (Blansko District) in the South Moravian Region

== See also ==
- Suchodol, Czech Republic
