= Dračice =

Dračice Reißbach
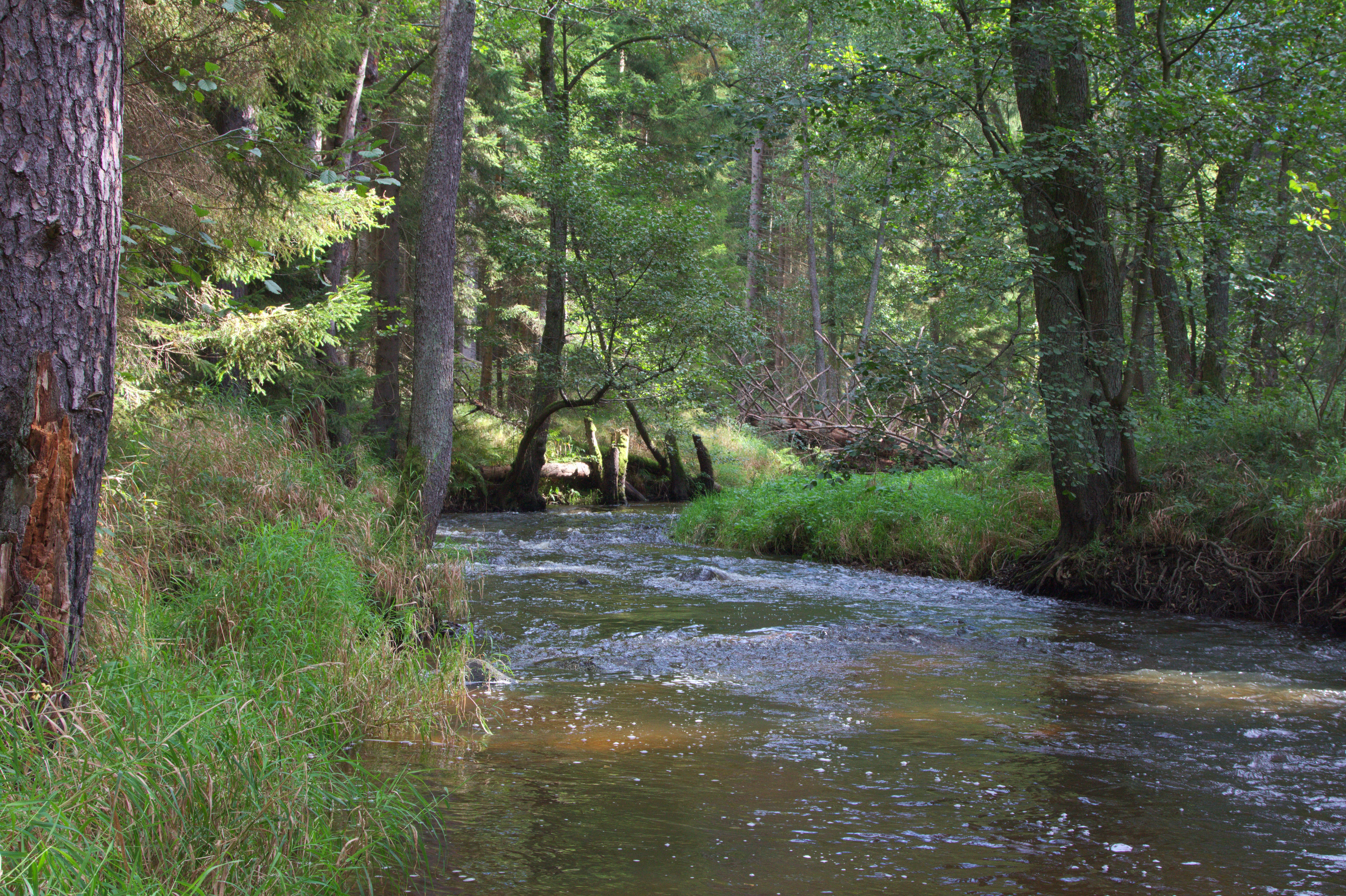
- The Dračice in the Dračice Nature Reserve

Location
- Countries: Czech Republic; Austria
- Regions/ States: South Bohemian; Lower Austria

Physical characteristics
- Source
  - location: Kunžak, Javořice Highlands
  - coordinates: 49°4′57″N 15°11′28″E
  - elevation: 672 m (2,205 ft)
- Mouth
  - location: Lužnice
  - coordinates: 48°54′50″N 14°53′42″E
  - elevation: 443 m (1,453 ft)
- Length: 51.0 km (31.7 mi)
- Basin size: 154.2 km^{2} (59.5 sq mi)
- Discharge
  - average: 1.23 m^{3}/s (43 cu ft/s) near estuary

Basin features
- Progression: Lužnice→ Vltava→ Elbe→ North Sea

The Dračice (German: Reißbach, Kastenitzer Bach) is a river in the Czech Republic and Austria, a right tributary of the Lužnice River. It flows through Lower Austria and the South Bohemian Region. It is 51.0 km (31.7 mi) long.

== Etymology ==
The name Dračice means 'female dragon' in Czech. It refers to the wild character of the river.

== Characteristic ==
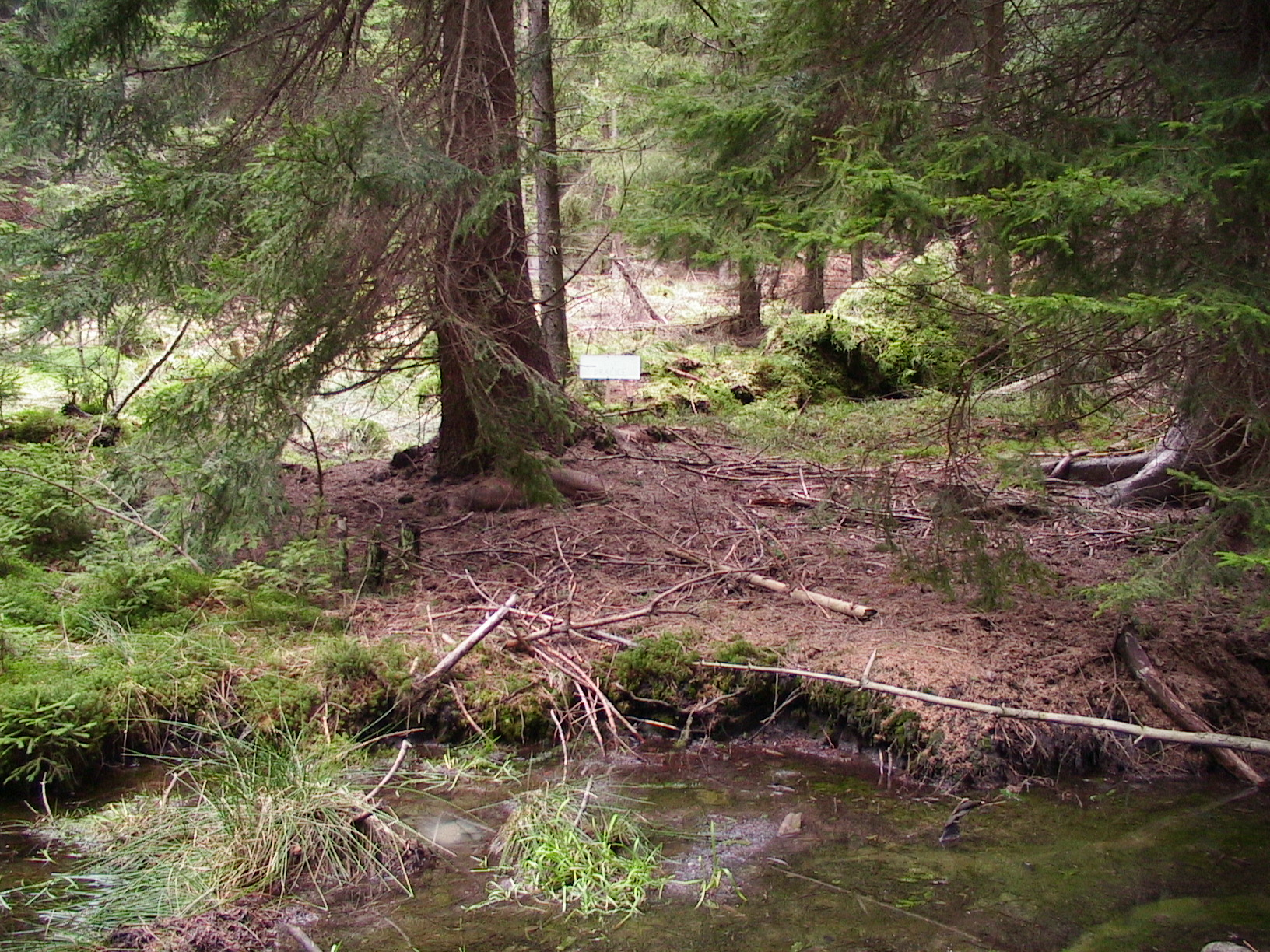
Spring of the Dračice

The Dračice originates in the territory of Kunžak in the Javořice Highlands at an elevation of 672 m (2,205 ft) and flows to Suchdol nad Lužnicí, where it enters the Lužnice River at an elevation of 443 m (1,453 ft). It is 51.0 km (31.7 mi) long, of which 30.4 km (18.9 mi) is in the Czech Republic. Its drainage basin has an area of 154.2 km^{2} (59.5 sq mi), of which 82.9 km^{2} (32.0 sq mi) is in the Czech Republic.

The average discharge at its mouth is 1.23 m^{3}/s (43 cu ft/s).

The Dračice collects many small tributaries, but lacks significant tributaries. The longest tributaries of the Dračice are:

Tributary	Length (km)	Side
Lunkowitzbach / Lunkovický potok	8.3	left
Reißbach	6.8	right

== Course ==
The river flows through the territories of Kunžak, Staré Město pod Landštejnem and Nová Bystřice in the Czech Republic, then through Haugschlag, Reingers, Litschau and Brand-Nagelberg in Austria, and then through Rapšach and Suchdol nad Lužnicí in the Czech Republic.

== Bodies of water ==
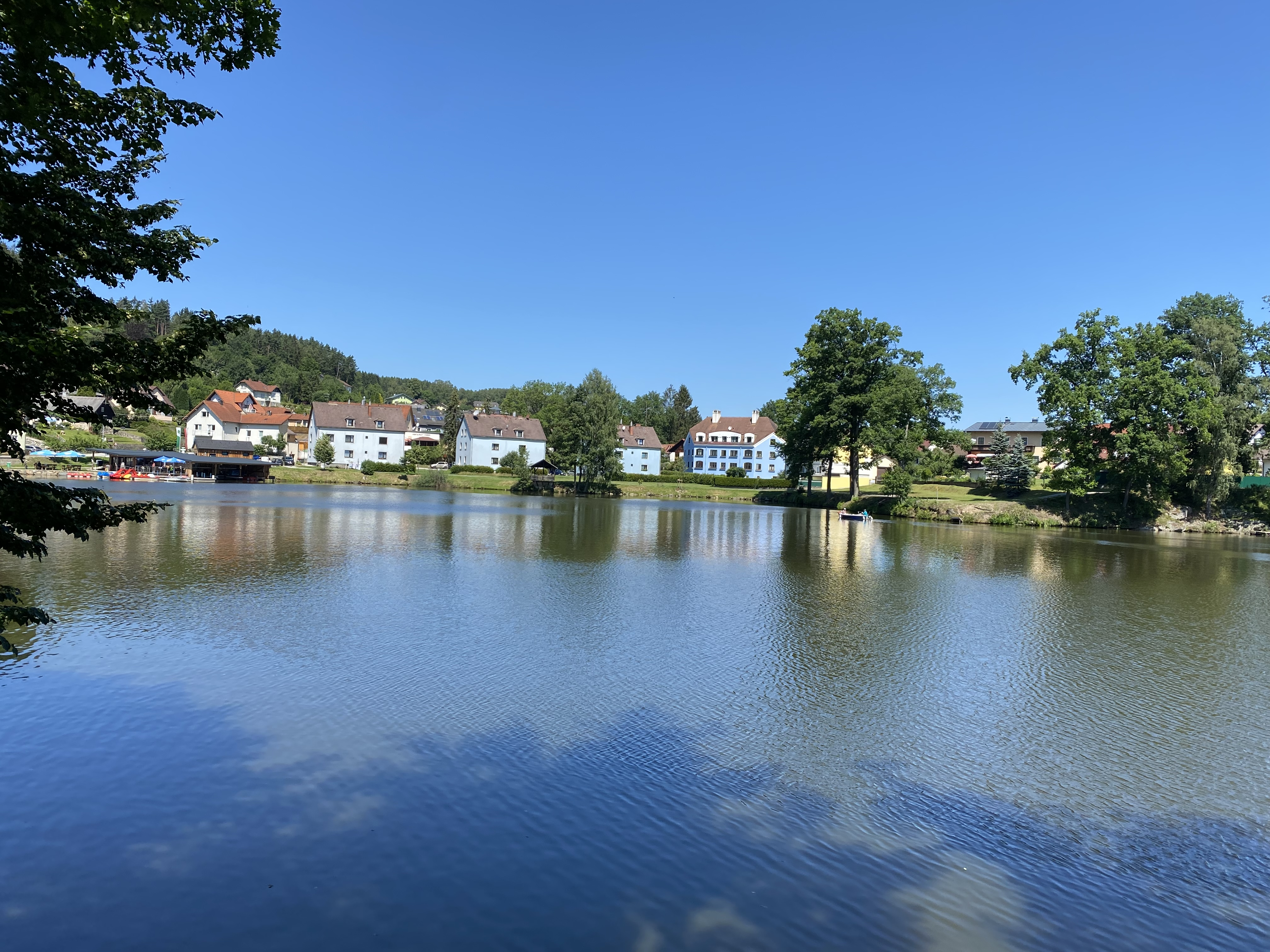
Hereensee pond

Several fishponds are built on the upper and middle course of the river. The largest of them is Osika with an area of about 67 ha (170 acres). A notable fishpond is Herrensee, located inside the built-up area of Litschau. It has an area of 24 ha (59 acres).

== Nature ==
The animals that live in the river include European bullhead, stone loach and brook lamprey. Nineteen species of dragonflies live near the water, including the European-wide endangered species green snaketail and golden-ringed dragonfly. The river is a hunting ground for the Eurasian otter, common kingfisher and grey wagtail.

The lower course of the Dračice flows through the Třeboňsko Protected Landscape Area. In addition, a 3.5 km (2.2 mi) long section of the river in this area with its immediate surroundings is protected as a nature reserve. The nature reserve has an area of 8.1 ha (20 acres). The river here forms a typically meandering river valley of a canyon-like character. Endangered and specially protected plant and animal species are bound to the river's aquatic ecosystem.

The last hundreds of metres of the Dračice before its mouth flow through the Na Ivance Nature Reserve, which is primarily focused on the meandering flow of the Lužnice River and the forests in its surroundings.

The area of the Osika fishpond is protected as the Osika Nature Monument. The reason for the protection is the occurrence of the critically endangered species of aquatic flowering plant Littorella uniflora.

The area of the fishpond Mnišský rybník is protected as the Mnišský rybník Nature Monument. The reason for the protection is the occurrence of the endangered species of grass Coleanthus subtilis.

== Tourism ==
The lower course of the Dračice is suitable for river tourism, but only in spring or after heavy rains.

== See also ==
- List of rivers of the Czech Republic
