= Lomnice nad Lužnicí =

- Town
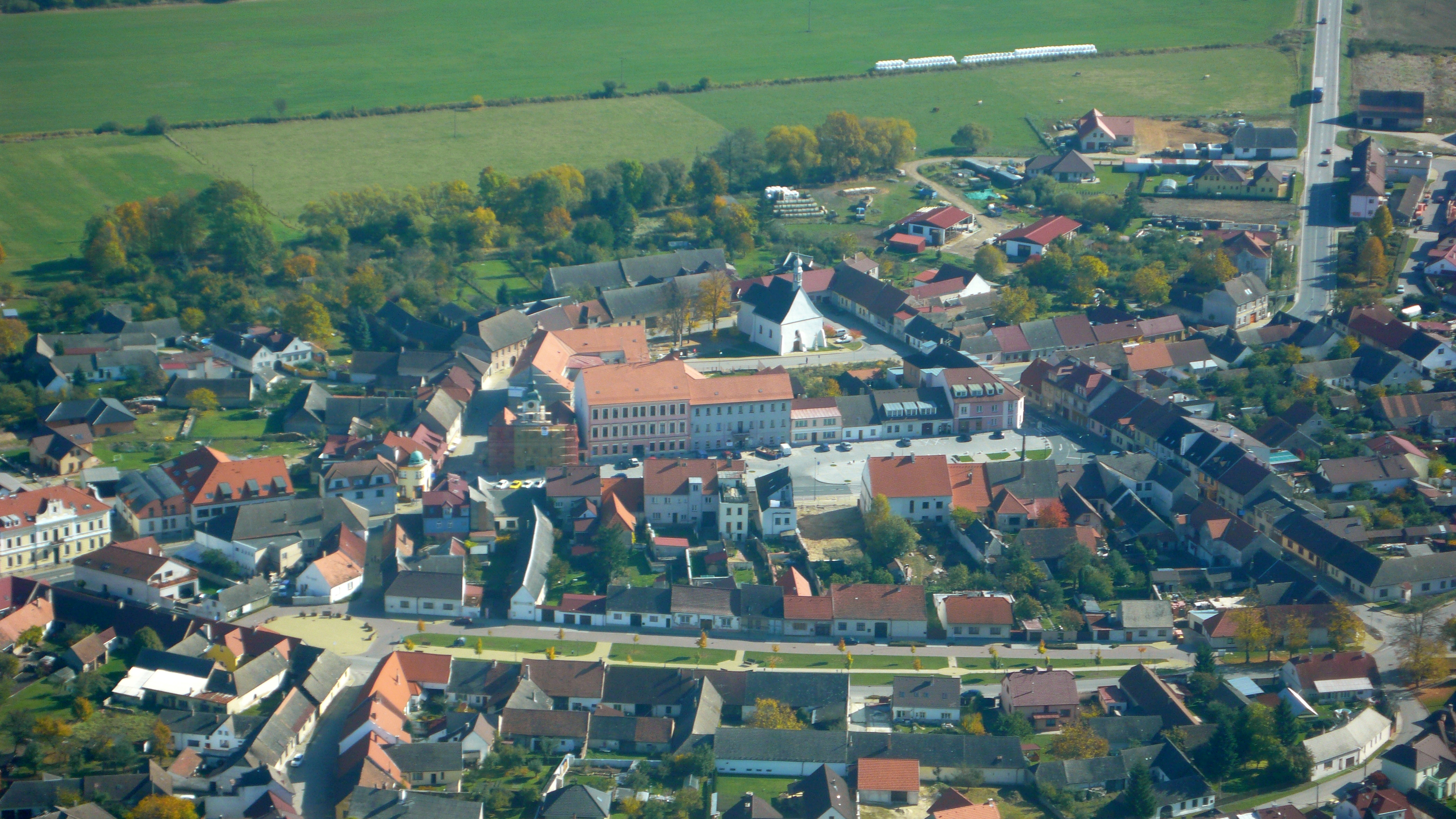
- Aerial view of the town centre

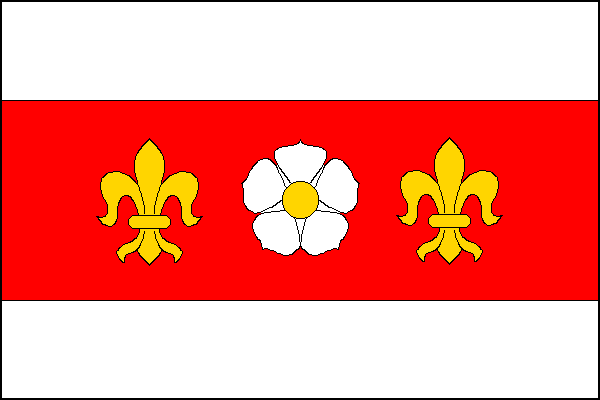
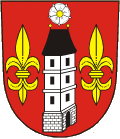
- Flag Coat of arms

- Location in the Czech Republic
- Coordinates: 49°5′5″N 14°43′2″E
- Country: Czech Republic
- Region: South Bohemian
- District: Jindřichův Hradec
- First mentioned: 1220

Government
  - Mayor: Petr Krejník

Area
  - Total: 18.89 km^{2} (7.29 sq mi)
- Elevation: 424 m (1,391 ft)

Population (2026-01-01)
  - Total: 1,779
  - Density: 94.18/km^{2} (243.9/sq mi)
- Time zone: UTC+1 (CET)
  - Summer (DST): UTC+2 (CEST)
- Postal code: 378 16
- Website: www.lomnice-nl.cz

Lomnice nad Lužnicí (Czech pronunciation: [ˈlomɲɪtsɛ ˈnad luʒɲɪtsiː]; German: Lomnitz an der Lainsitz) is a town in Jindřichův Hradec District in the South Bohemian Region of the Czech Republic. It has about 1,800 inhabitants. The town is located in the Třeboň Basin, in an area known for many watercourses and fishponds.

== Etymology ==
The name of the town is derived from the local stream, which used to be called Lomnice. The stream's name was derived from the Czech adjective lomný, which could mean 'noisy' or 'crooked'.

== Geography ==
Lomnice nad Lužnicí is located about 21 kilometres (13 mi) west of Jindřichův Hradec and 20 km (12 mi) northeast of České Budějovice. It lies in the Třeboň Basin and in the Třeboňsko Protected Landscape Area. The stream Miletínský potok and the artificially created channel Zlatá stoka flow through the town. The Lužnice River flows east of the town and briefly forms the municipal border. Velký Tisý, one of the largest ponds in the Czech Republic, is located in the municipal territory, along with several smaller fishponds.

== History ==
The first written mention of Lomnice is from 1220. Probably around 1250, a castle was built here. The settlement was promoted to a town in 1382 by King Wenceslaus IV. From 1435 to 1611, it was property of the Rosenberg family. During this era, Lomnice prospered and many fishponds were established in the vicinity of the town.

Since 1789, the town has been named Lomnice nad Lužnicí, although the Lužnice river flows further from the town.

== Demographics ==
Historical population

Year	Pop.	±%
1869	1,954	—
1880	1,820	−6.9%
1890	1,934	+6.3%
1900	1,774	−8.3%
1910	1,869	+5.4%

Year	Pop.	±%
1921	1,884	+0.8%
1930	1,751	−7.1%
1950	1,627	−7.1%
1961	1,748	+7.4%
1970	1,608	−8.0%

Year	Pop.	±%
1980	1,580	−1.7%
1991	1,574	−0.4%
2001	1,585	+0.7%
2011	1,744	+10.0%
2021	1,701	−2.5%

Source: Censuses

== Transport ==
The I/24 road, which connects the D3 motorway with the Czech–Austrian border in Halámky, runs through the town.

Lomnice nad Lužnicí is located on the railway line Veselí nad Lužnicí–České Velenice.

== Sights ==
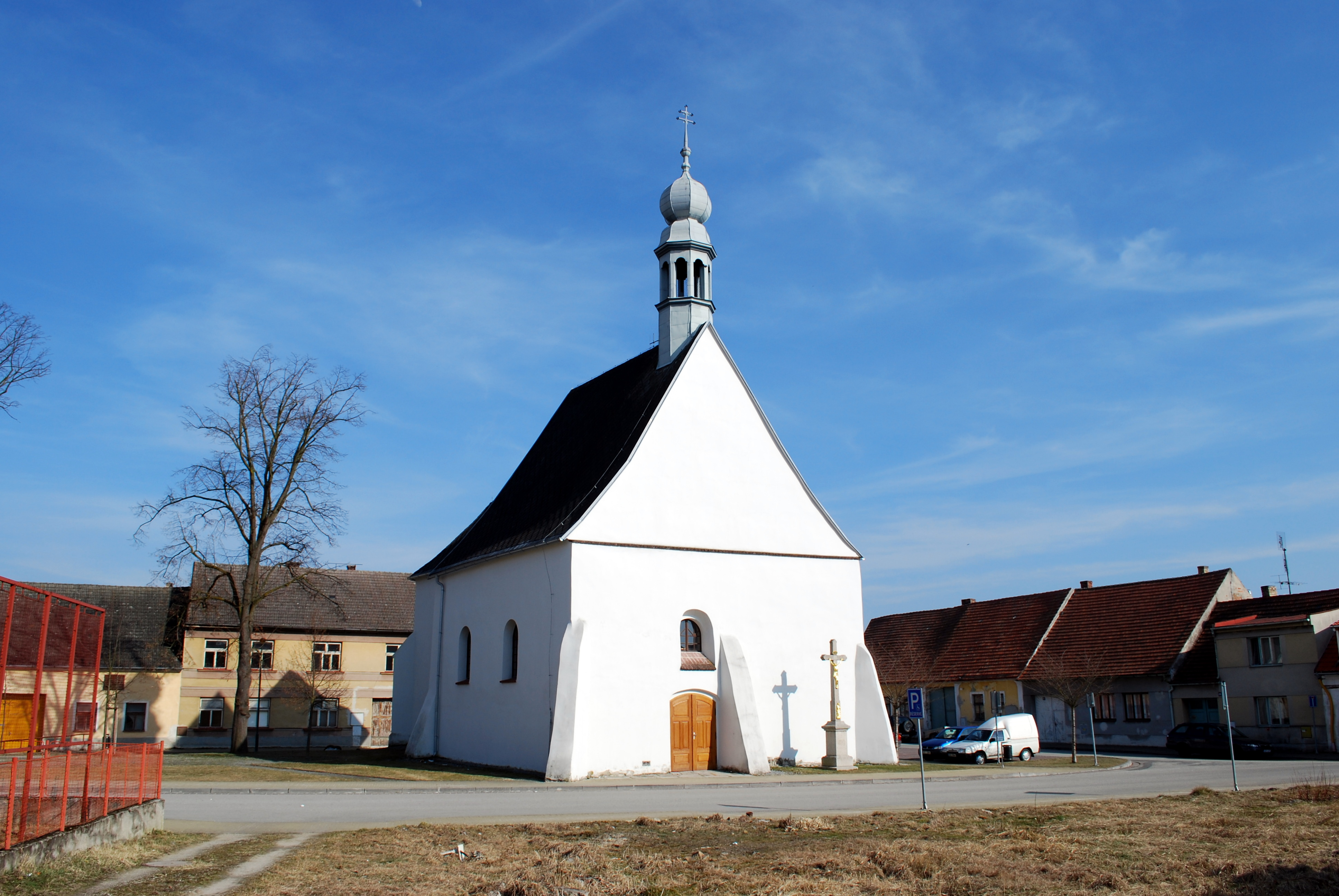
Church of Saint Wenceslaus

The Church of Saint Wenceslaus was built in 1359, originally as castle chapel of the Corpus Christi and Saints Peter and Paul. More extensive reconstructions were made in 1635 and 1645, after the church was damaged during the Thirty Years' War, and the church was consecrated to Saint Wenceslaus. Despite several reconstructions, it still has a Gothic floor plan.

The Church of Saint John the Baptist was built in 1358 on the site of a shrine that stood here before the castle was built. The tower was rebuilt into the Neo-Gothic style in 1872.

== Twin towns – sister cities ==
Lomnice nad Lužnicí is twinned with:

- Bad Großpertholz, Austria
- Dießen am Ammersee, Germany
