= Lužice =

Lužice may refer to places:

== Czech Republic ==
- Lužice (Hodonín District), a municipality and village in South Moravian Region
- Lužice (Most District), a municipality and village in Ústí nad Labem Region
- Lužice (Olomouc District), a municipality and village in Olomouc Region
- Lužice (Prachatice District), a municipality and village in South Bohemian Region

== Other ==
- Lužice, Czech name for Lusatia

== See also ==
- Lusatian Mountains
- Lužnice (disambiguation)
