= Weissensteiner =

Weissensteiner is a German surname. Notable people with the surname include:

- Friedrich Weissensteiner (1927–2023), Austrian historian and writer
- Gerda Weissensteiner (born 1969), Italian luger and bobsleigh pilot

== See also ==
- Weissenstein
- Weissteiner
