= Nová Ves nad Lužnicí =

- Municipality
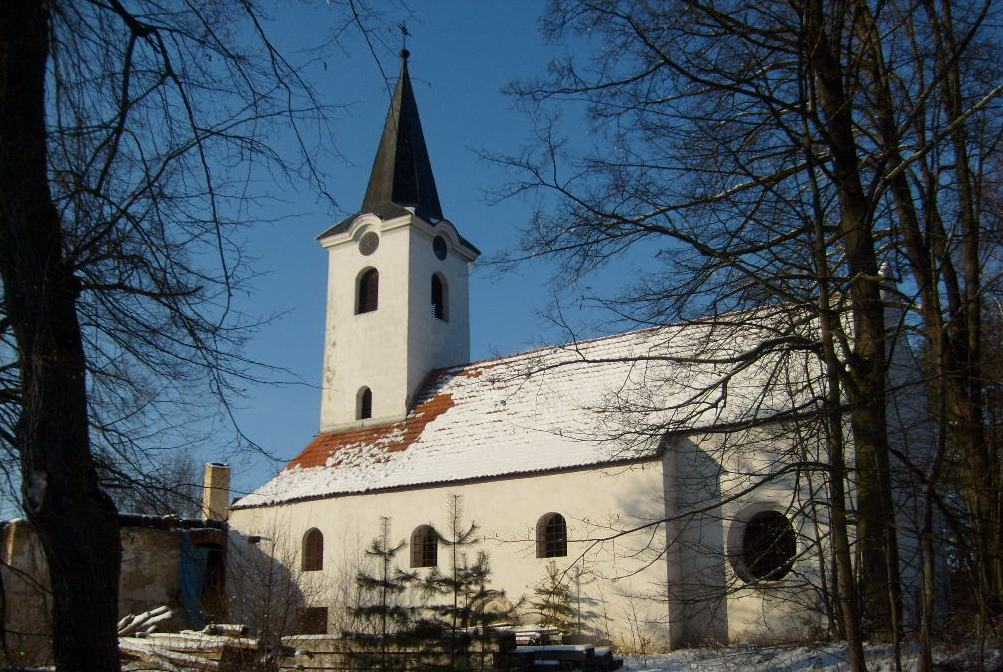
- Church of Saint John the Baptist

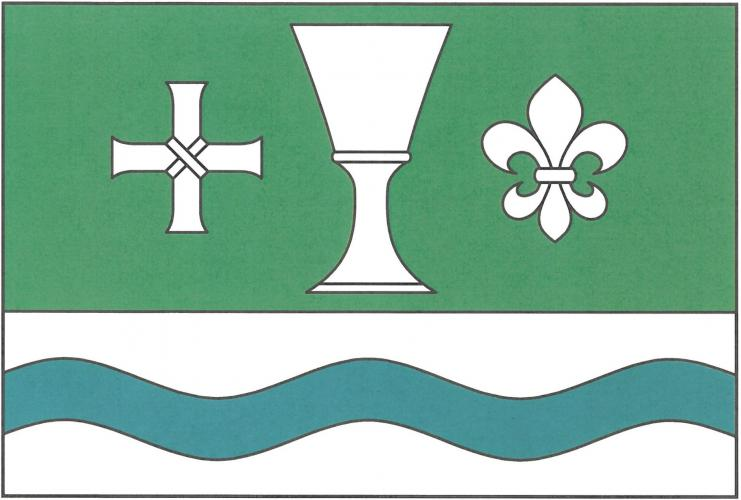
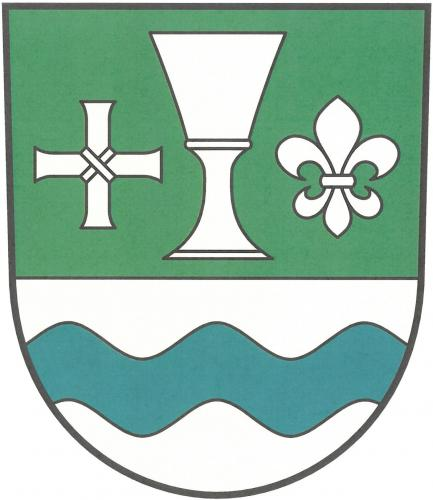
- Flag Coat of arms

- Location in the Czech Republic
- Coordinates: 48°48′39″N 14°55′32″E
- Country: Czech Republic
- Region: South Bohemian
- District: Jindřichův Hradec
- First mentioned: 1499

Area
  - Total: 23.82 km^{2} (9.20 sq mi)
- Elevation: 474 m (1,555 ft)

Population (2026-01-01)
  - Total: 353
  - Density: 14.8/km^{2} (38.4/sq mi)
- Time zone: UTC+1 (CET)
  - Summer (DST): UTC+2 (CEST)
- Postal codes: 378 06, 378 09
- Website: www.novavesnadluznici.cz

Nová Ves nad Lužnicí (German: Erdweis) is a municipality and village in Jindřichův Hradec District in the South Bohemian Region of the Czech Republic. It has about 400 inhabitants.

Nová Ves nad Lužnicí lies on the Lužnice River, approximately 38 kilometres (24 mi) south of Jindřichův Hradec, 38 km (24 mi) south-east of České Budějovice, and 146 km (91 mi) south of Prague.

== Administrative division ==
Nová Ves nad Lužnicí consists of two municipal parts (in brackets population according to the 2021 census):

- Nová Ves nad Lužnicí (295)
- Žofina Huť (35)

== Demographics ==
Historical population
Year	Pop.	±%
1869	1,284	—
1880	1,436	+11.8%
1890	1,560	+8.6%
1900	1,487	−4.7%
1910	1,682	+13.1%
1921	1,425	−15.3%
1930	1,315	−7.7%
1950	634	−51.8%
1961	588	−7.3%
1970	547	−7.0%
1980	404	−26.1%
1991	335	−17.1%
2001	316	−5.7%
2011	326	+3.2%
2021	330	+1.2%
Source: Censuses
