= Friedrich Weissensteiner =

Austrian historian and writer (1927–2023)

- Born: 25 November 1927; Bad Großpertholz, Austria
- Died: 21 January 2023 (aged 95); Vienna, Austria
- Education: University of Vienna
- Occupations: Historian; Writer

Friedrich Weissensteiner (25 November 1927 – 21 January 2023) was an Austrian historian and writer.

== Biography ==
Born in Bad Großpertholz on 25 November 1927, Weissensteiner studied history and English at the University of Vienna. After earning a doctorate, he taught secondary school and directed the Bundesgymnasium Döbling from 1974 to 1987. As a historian, he gained notoriety as the author and editor of multiple contemporary works.

The main subject of Weissensteiner's works focused on the monarchy of the Austrian Empire, namely with various members of the Habsburg family. He wrote lengthy biographies on Archduchess Elisabeth Marie, Archduke Johann Salvator, and Archduke Franz Ferdinand.

Weissensteiner died in Vienna on 21 January 2023, at the age of 95.

== Honors ==
- Gold Decoration of Merit of the state Wien
- Austrian Decoration for Science and Art First Class
- Grand Decoration of Honour of the Decoration of Honour for Services to the Republic of Austria

== Works ==
- Zwischen Gestern und Morgen (1971)
- Österreich und die Welt. Historischer Atlas (1976)
- Die rote Erzherzogin. Das ungewöhnliche Leben der Tochter des Kronprinzen Rudolf (1982)
- Franz Ferdinand. Der verhinderte Herrscher (1983)
- Ein Aussteiger aus dem Kaiserhaus, Johann Orth. Das eskapadenreiche Leben des Erzherzogs Johann Salvator (1985)
- Reformer, Republikaner und Rebellen. Das andere Haus Habsburg-Lothringen (1987)
- Schicksalstage Österreichs. Wendepunkte, Krisen, Entwicklungen (1989)
- Der ungeliebte Staat. Österreich zwischen 1918 und 1938 (1990)
- Frauen um Kronprinz Rudolf (1991)
- Österreichisches Personenlexikon der Ersten und Zweiten Republik (1992)
- Publikumslieblinge. Von Hans Albers bis Paula Wessely (1993)
- Die Töchter Maria Theresias (1994)
- Zwischen Idylle und Revolution. Ungewöhnliche Biedermeierporträts (1995)
- Große Herrscher des Hauses Habsburg (1995)
- Große Österreicher des 20. Jahrhunderts (1997)
- Frauen auf Habsburgs Thron (1998)
- Liebeshimmel und Ehehöllen. Heiraten zwischen Habsburgern und Wittelsbachern (1999)
- Sie haben für uns gespielt. 105 Porträts berühmter Film- und Bühnenpersönlichkeiten (1999)
- Habsburgerinnen auf fremden Thronen (2000)
- Berühmte Selbstmörder (2000)
- Liebe in fremden Betten. Große Persönlichkeiten und ihre Affären (2001)
- Die Frauen der Genies (2002)
- Die österreichischen Kaiser (2003)
- Die Söhne Maria Theresias (2004)
- An den Hebeln der Macht. Die Parteiführer der Zweiten Republik (2005)
- Die Kinder der Genies. August von Goethe, Siegfried Wagner, Anna Freud, Erika und Klaus Mann, Anna Mahler (2005)
- Klein und berühmt. Edith Piaf, Henri de Toulouse-Lautrec, Gottfried Keller, Franz Schubert, Napoleon Bonaparte, Immanuel Kant, Prinz Eugen (2006)
- Von Maria Theresia bis Helmut Qualtinger. 50 Porträts berühmter Österreicher (2007)
- Die großen Herrscher des Hauses Habsburg. 700 Jahre europäische Geschichte (2007)
- Ich sehne mich sehr nach dir. Frauen im Leben Kaiser Franz Josephs (2012)
