= Rapšach =

- Municipality
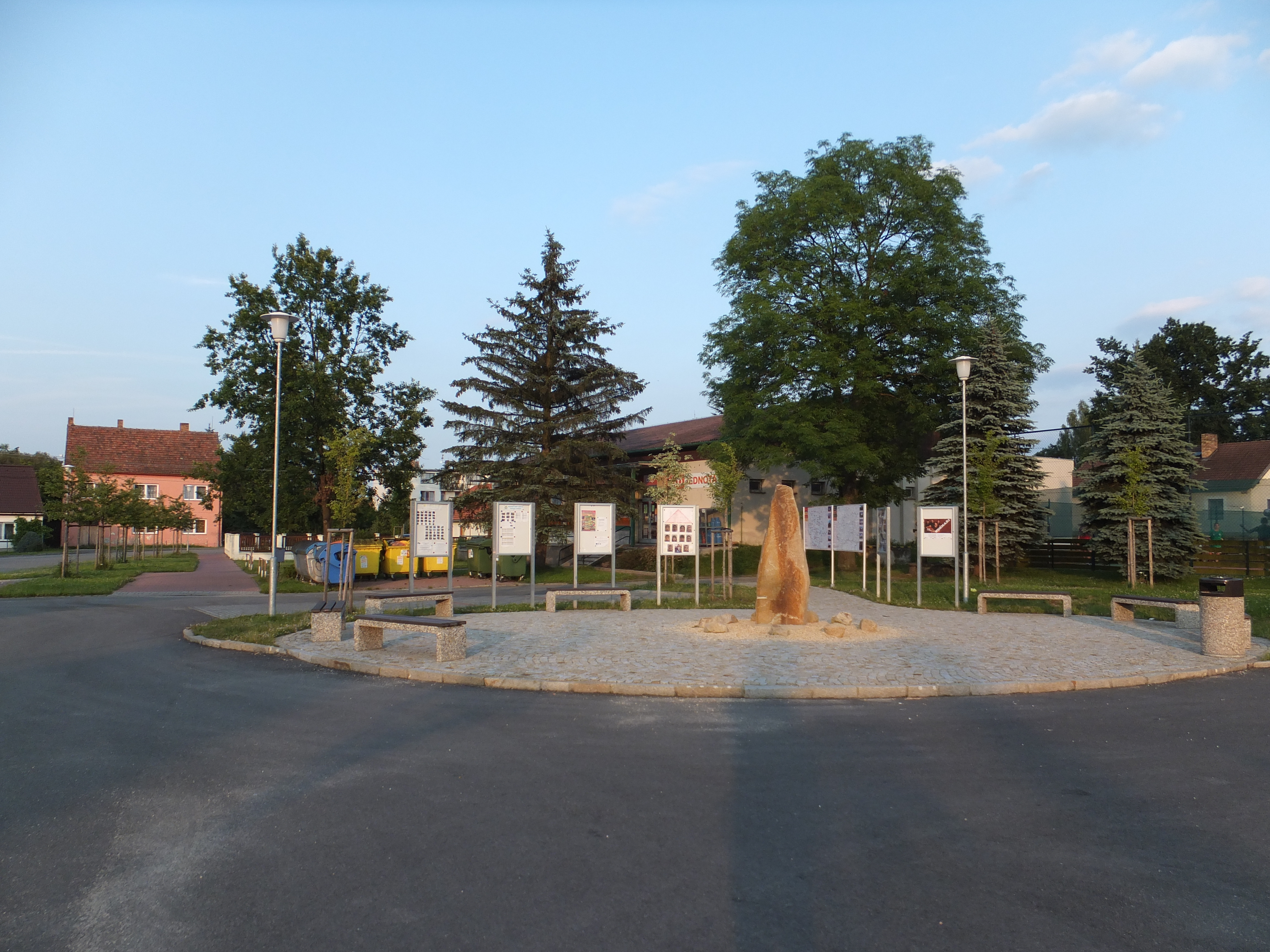
- Centre of Rapšach

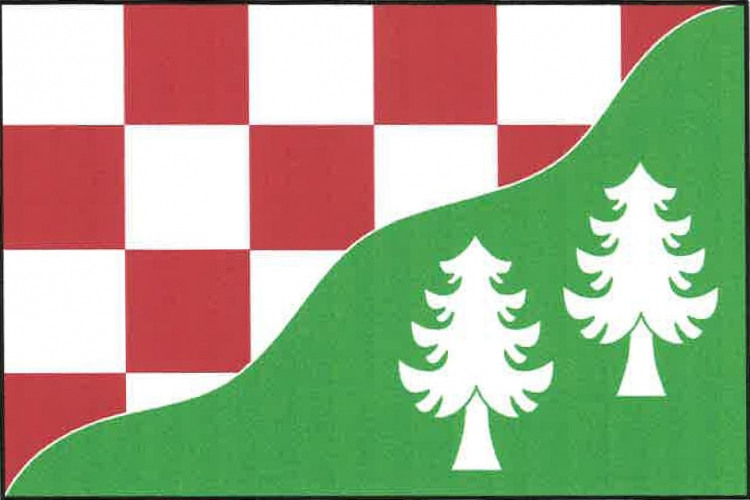
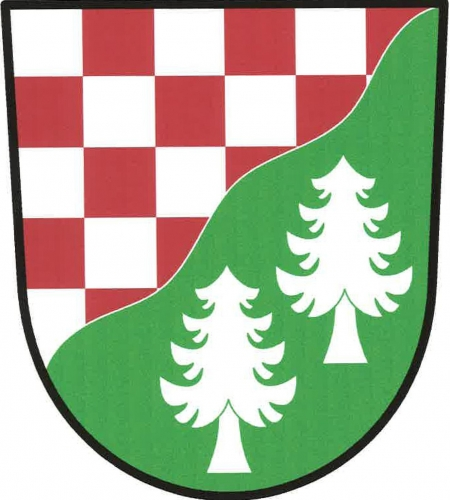
- Flag Coat of arms

- Location in the Czech Republic
- Coordinates: 48°52′45″N 14°55′58″E
- Country: Czech Republic
- Region: South Bohemian
- District: Jindřichův Hradec
- First mentioned: 1338

Area
  - Total: 28.35 km^{2} (10.95 sq mi)
- Elevation: 472 m (1,549 ft)

Population (2026-01-01)
  - Total: 599
  - Density: 21.1/km^{2} (54.7/sq mi)
- Time zone: UTC+1 (CET)
  - Summer (DST): UTC+2 (CEST)
- Postal code: 378 07
- Website: www.obec-rapsach.cz

Rapšach is a municipality and village in Jindřichův Hradec District in the South Bohemian Region of the Czech Republic. It has about 600 inhabitants.

Rapšach lies approximately 31 kilometres (19 mi) south of Jindřichův Hradec, 37 km (23 mi) east of České Budějovice, and 140 km (87 mi) south of Prague.

== Administrative division ==
Rapšach consists of two municipal parts (in brackets population according to the 2021 census):

- Rapšach (614)
- Nová Ves u Klikova (0)

== Demographics ==
Historical population
Year	Pop.	±%
1869	2,104	—
1880	2,636	+25.3%
1890	2,746	+4.2%
1900	2,864	+4.3%
1910	2,912	+1.7%
1921	2,661	−8.6%
1930	2,270	−14.7%
1950	1,471	−35.2%
1961	751	−48.9%
1970	741	−1.3%
1980	655	−11.6%
1991	564	−13.9%
2001	550	−2.5%
2011	568	+3.3%
2021	614	+8.1%
Source: Censuses
