= Lužnice (Jindřichův Hradec District) =

- Municipality
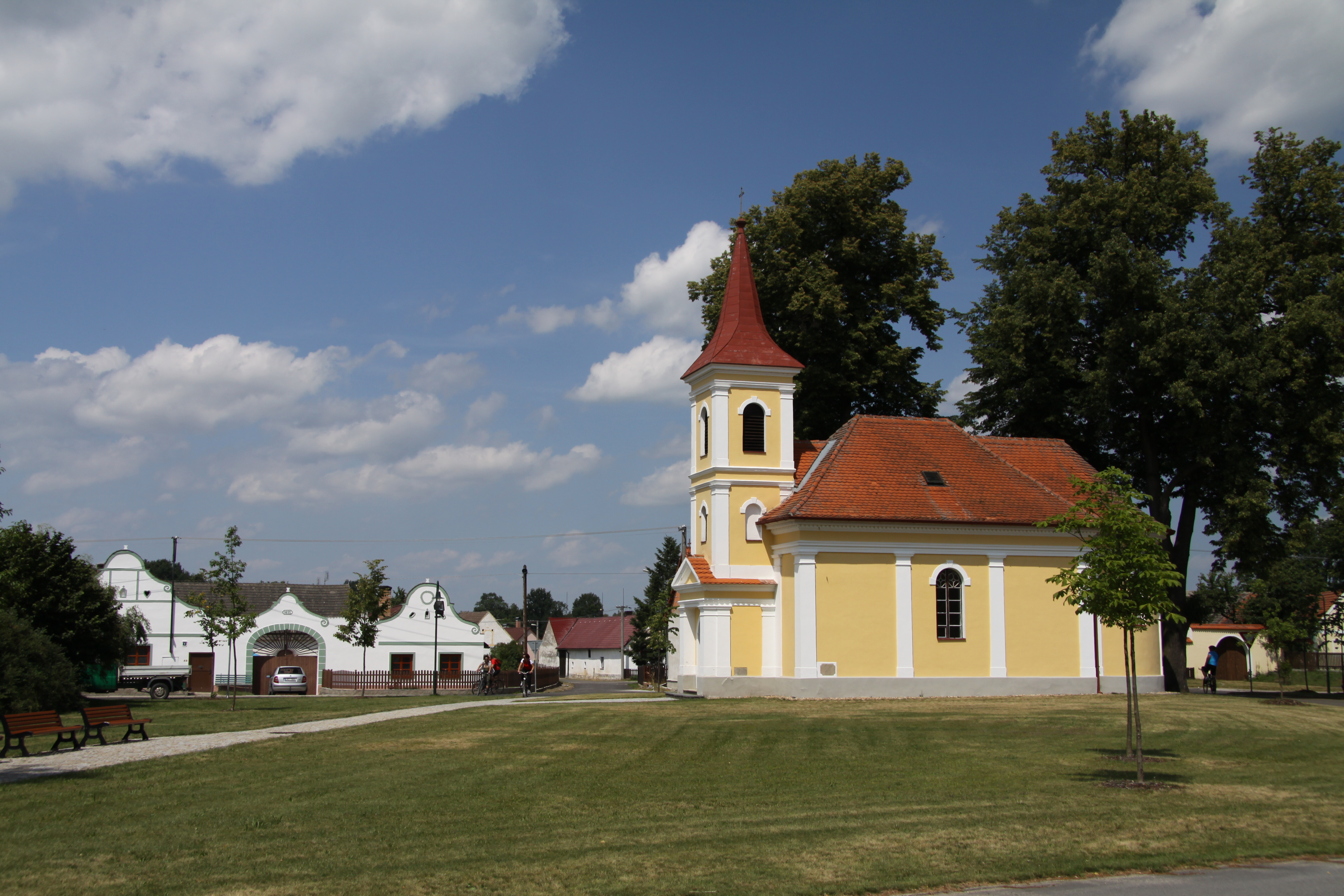
- Chapel of Saint John of Nepomuk

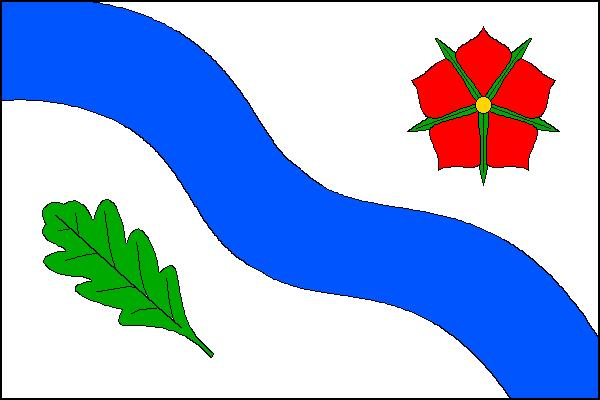
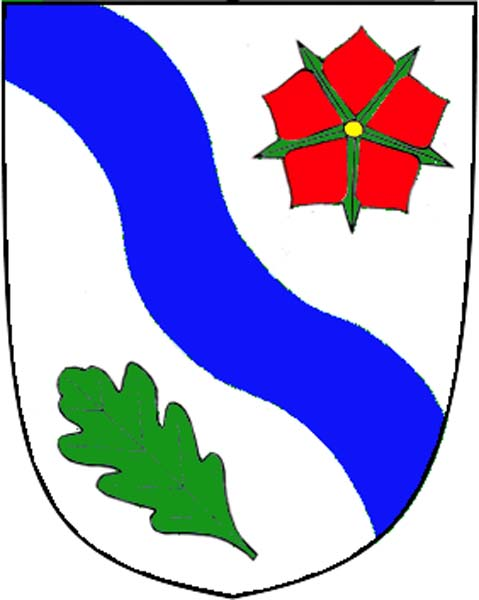
- Flag Coat of arms

- Location in the Czech Republic
- Coordinates: 49°3′47″N 14°45′22″E
- Country: Czech Republic
- Region: South Bohemian
- District: Jindřichův Hradec
- First mentioned: 1371

Area
  - Total: 12.14 km^{2} (4.69 sq mi)
- Elevation: 426 m (1,398 ft)

Population (2026-01-01)
  - Total: 423
  - Density: 34.8/km^{2} (90.2/sq mi)
- Time zone: UTC+1 (CET)
  - Summer (DST): UTC+2 (CEST)
- Postal code: 379 01
- Website: www.obec-luznice.cz

Lužnice is a municipality and village in Jindřichův Hradec District in the South Bohemian Region of the Czech Republic. It has about 400 inhabitants.

Lužnice lies approximately 20 kilometres (12 mi) south-west of Jindřichův Hradec, 24 km (15 mi) north-east of České Budějovice, and 116 km (72 mi) south of Prague.

== Demographics ==
Historical population
| Year | Pop. | ±% |
|---|---|---|
| 1869 | 613 | — |
| 1880 | 645 | +5.2% |
| 1890 | 690 | +7.0% |
| 1900 | 588 | −14.8% |
| 1910 | 544 | −7.5% |
| 1921 | 544 | +0.0% |
| 1930 | 574 | +5.5% |
| 1950 | 435 | −24.2% |
| 1961 | 446 | +2.5% |
| 1970 | 391 | −12.3% |
| 1980 | 351 | −10.2% |
| 1991 | 307 | −12.5% |
| 2001 | 366 | +19.2% |
| 2011 | 418 | +14.2% |
| 2021 | 423 | +1.2% |
Source: Censuses
