= Nautical tourism =

Tourism by boat travel

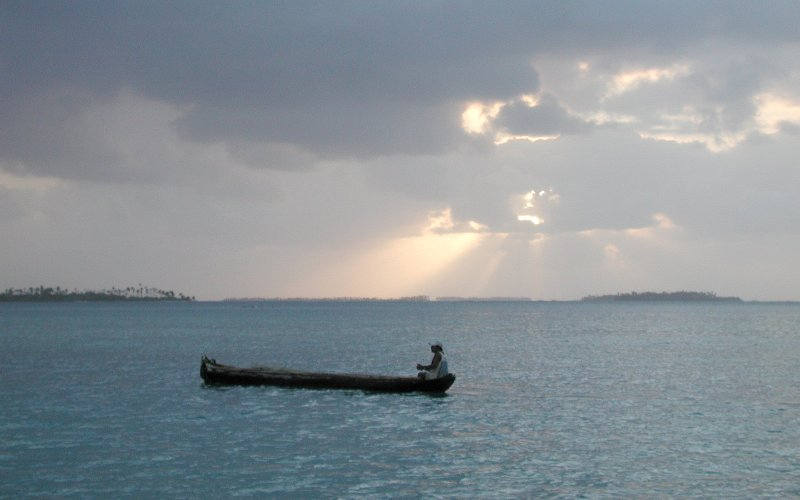
Cruisers can see traditional life in remote areas of the world; here, a Guna canoeist paddles a dugout canoe in the San Blas Islands.

Nautical tourism, also called water tourism, is tourism that combines sailing and boating with vacation and holiday activities. It can be travelling from port to port in a cruise ship, or joining boat-centered events such as regattas or landing a small boat for lunch or other day recreation at specially prepared day boat-landings. It is a form of tourism that is generally more popular in the summertime.

First defined as an industry segment in Europe and South America, it has since caught on in the United States and the Pacific Rim.

== About ==
Many tourists who enjoy sailing combine water travel with other activities. Supplying the equipment and accessories for those activities has spawned businesses for those purposes. With many nautical enthusiasts living on board their vessels even in port, nautical tourists bring demand for a variety of goods and services. Marinas developed especially for nautical tourists have been built in Europe, South America and Australia.

== Services ==
Tourist services available at marinas catering to nautical tourists include:

- Leasing of berths for sailing vessels and nautical tourists who live on board.
- Leasing of sailing vessels for holiday and recreational use (charter, cruising and similar),
- Reception, safe-guarding and maintenance of sailing vessels.
- Provision of stock (water, fuel, supplies, spare parts, equipment and similar).
- Preparation and keeping sailing vessels in order.
- Providing information to nautical enthusiasts (weather forecasts, nautical guides etc.)
- Leasing of water scooters, jet skis, and other water equipment.

== By region ==
=== Europe ===
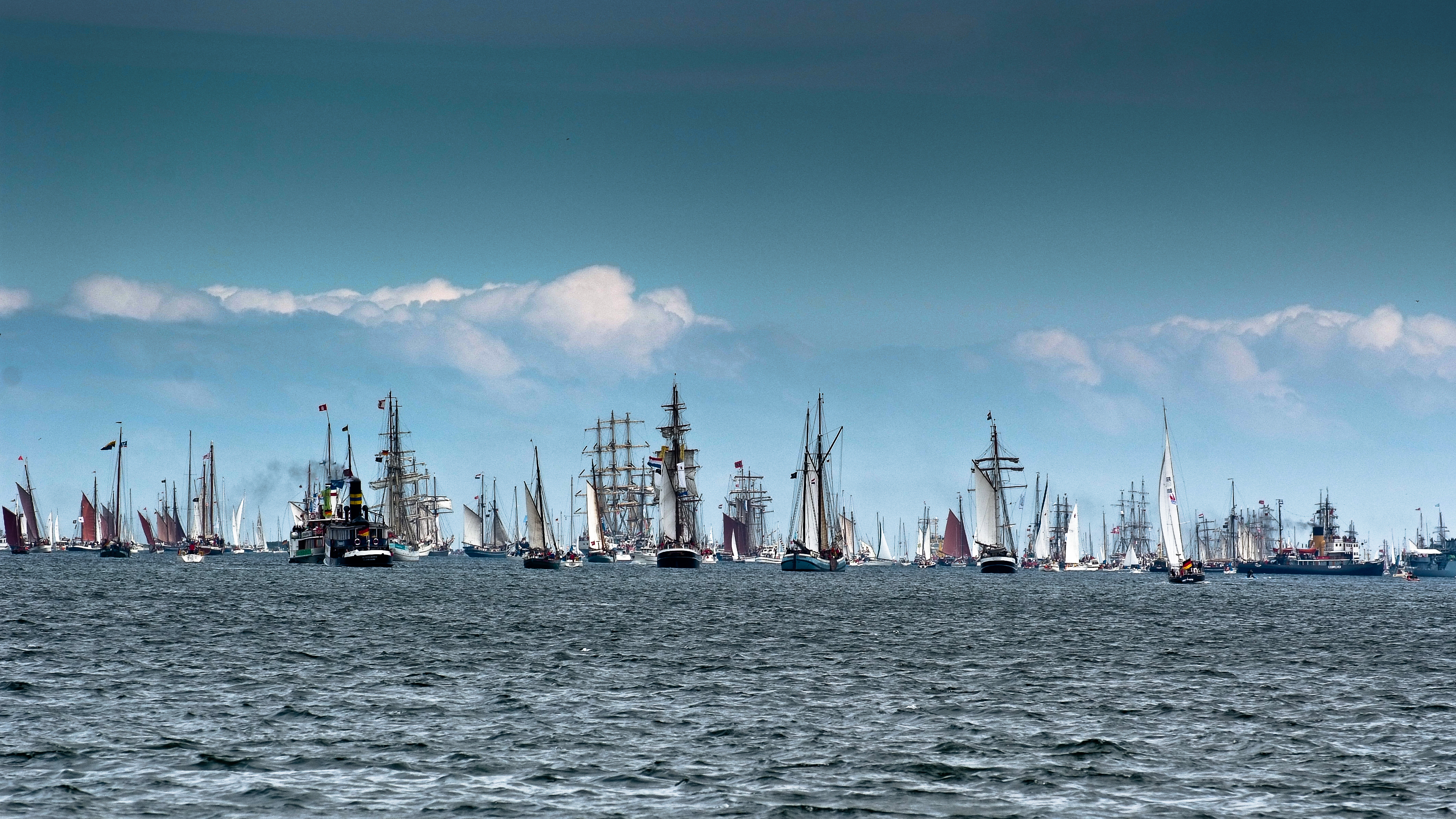
Windjammer Parade at Kiel Week in Germany, a major water tourism attraction

==== Netherlands ====
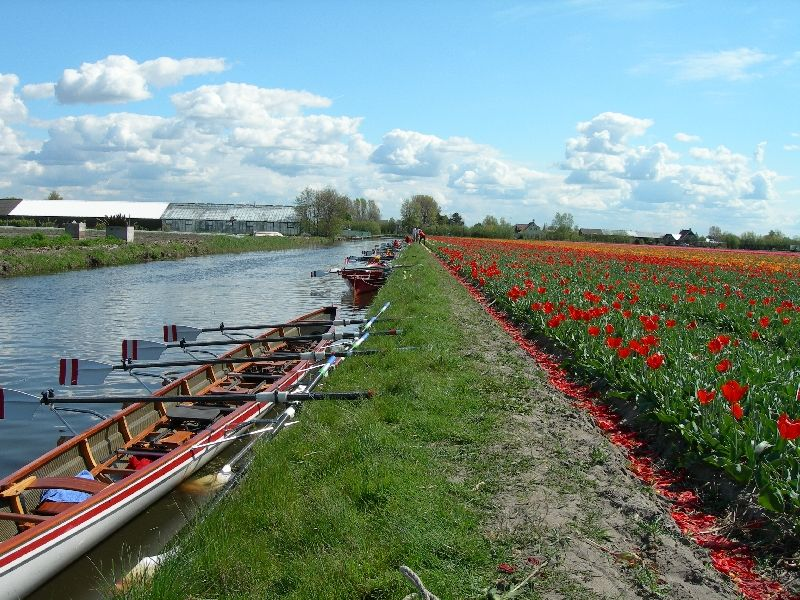
Rowing water tourists in Hillegom in April, when the tulip fields are in bloom

Water travel used to be the only form of transportation between cities in the Netherlands. Since improvements in the road and rail structure, less and less commercial freight water traffic is using the water. In the latter half of the 20th century the growth of water tourism exceeded the amount of freight traffic, and older cities whose ports were long disused refurbished them for water tourists. Water tourists are a strong lobby for protecting old water routes from being closed or filled. Both refurnished antique canal boats ("salonboten") and modern tour boats ("rondvaartboten") are available for tourist day trips in most Dutch cities. A steady tourist industry has kept both the old canals of Amsterdam and their canal mansions open for water traffic. Their popularity has introduced water traffic safety laws to ensure that the commercial passenger boats have right-of-way over private skiffs and low yachts, while preventing fatal accidents.

To reduce the less desired side-effects of popular watertourist spots, the public awards stimulate sustainable tourist innovations, such as the EDEN award for the electricity-propelled tourist boats in De Weerribben-Wieden National Park.

==== Czech Republic ====
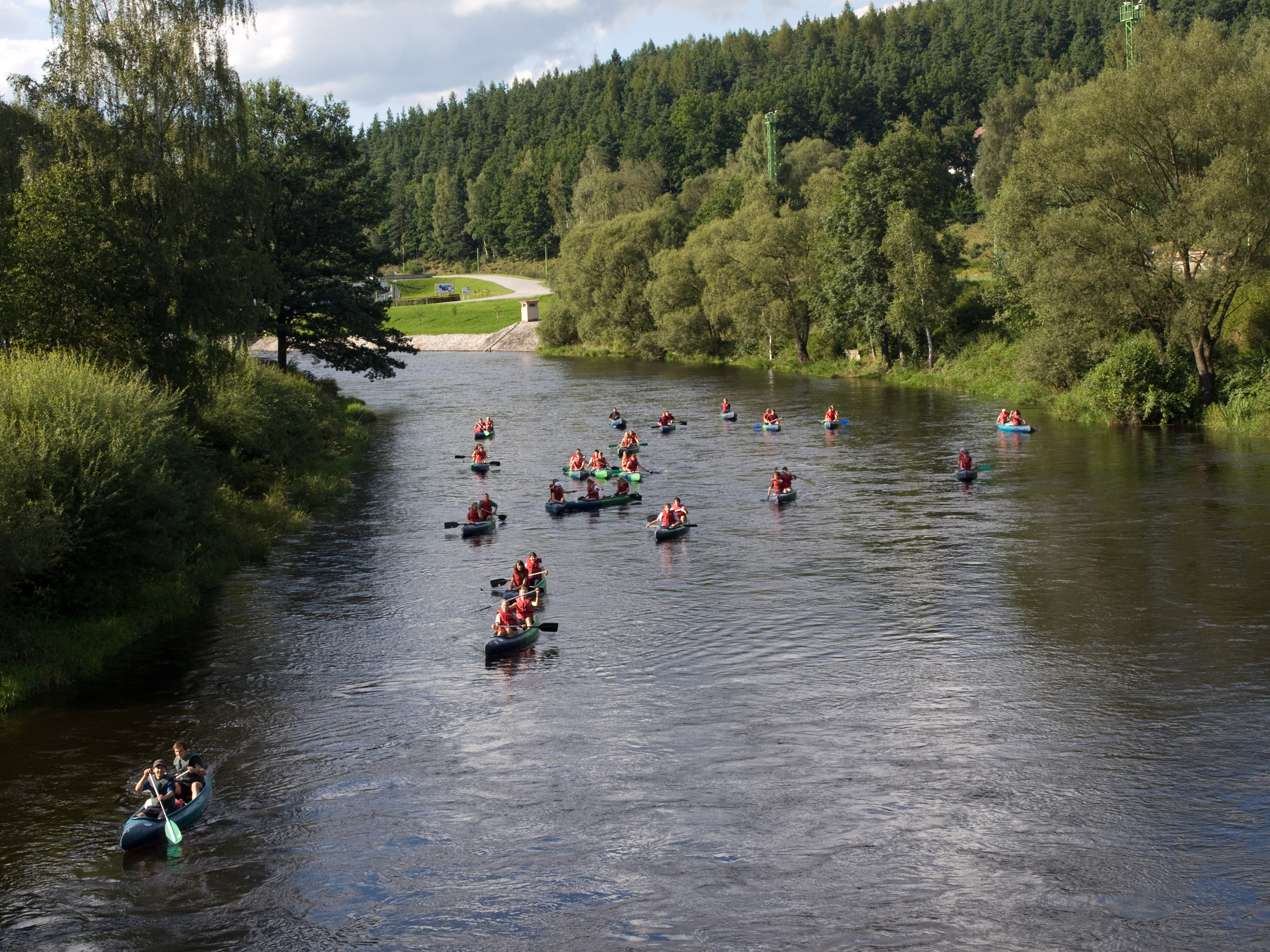
Water tourists on the Vltava river in Vyšší Brod

River tourism is exceptionally popular among the Czech people, who sail by canoes, rafts or other boats downstream major Bohemian rivers as Vltava, Sázava, Lužnice, Ohře and Otava. The most popular and frequented river section is the Vltava from Vyšší Brod via Rožmberk nad Vltavou and Český Krumlov to Zlatá Koruna, which is annually visited by as many as hundreds of thousands paddlers (in Czech called vodáci, sg. vodák). The lowest section of the Sázava (downstream from Týnec nad Sázavou) is also very frequented, for its fine rapids, scenic landscape, and proximity to Prague. In peak season, "traffic jams" can be regularly seen on the busiest rivers, mainly at weirs. The most popular river sections are plentifully equipped with camps, stands, pubs, and boat rental services. There has even some "paddlers' culture" developed, with peculiar slang, songs, traditions etc., related to the Czech tramping movement.

=== Pacific ===
Australia has invested $1.5 billion in facilities designed to attract nautical tourists and promote development of nautical tourism as a segment of the tourist trade. In 2016/17 saw the industry's total national economic contribution in Australia grow by 15.4% and contributed A$5.3 billion to the Australian economy. Sydney, Brisbane and Melbourne accounted for 65% of the total passenger onshore visit days.

=== South America ===
A growing worldwide industry segment, nautical tourism has become popular in South America. The Brazilian Ministry of Tourism has a website devoted to the subject. Puerto Rico has seen its share of growth in nautical tourism as well. Not to be outdone, the Chilean Economic Development Agency has launched the Chilean Patagonia Nautical Tourism Program to develop and attract nautical tourists to the Chilean coast.

=== United States ===
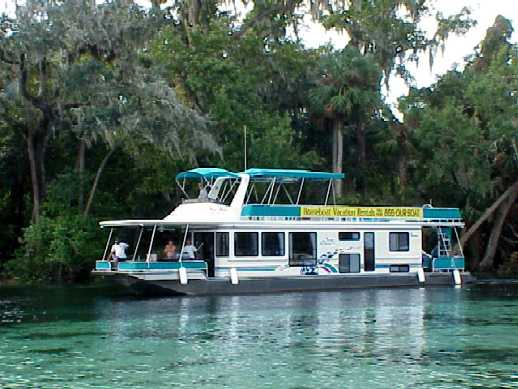
A houseboat in Silver Glen Springs, just off Lake George, Florida

In the Southeastern United States, the Tennessee–Tombigbee Waterway, a meandering river and canal system that traverses Alabama and Mississippi linking the Tennessee River with the Gulf of Mexico, has become a favorite boating trail for nautical tourists who want a diverse route with a scenic view. Originally conceived as an alternate shipping route for barges destined for the Midwest, the route proved too awkward for large tows. However, boating enthusiasts discovered it as a great way to see Middle-America. Stops along the way include Mobile, Alabama, Demopolis, Alabama, and Amory and Columbus in Mississippi. Travelling north from the Gulf, boaters can follow the Tennessee River its intersection with the Ohio and travel a circuitous route back to the Gulf by way of New Orleans.

The Intracoastal Waterway system, which stretches from Texas to New Jersey, has long provided nautical tourists with a well-marked channel and an inside passage that allows boaters to travel from southern Texas up the eastern seaboard without having to venture onto the high seas. Using this route, boaters can stop at Galveston, Texas, any number of towns in southern Louisiana, including New Orleans. Farther west, Apalachicola, Florida provides a glimpse of Florida the way it used to be.

== Gallery ==
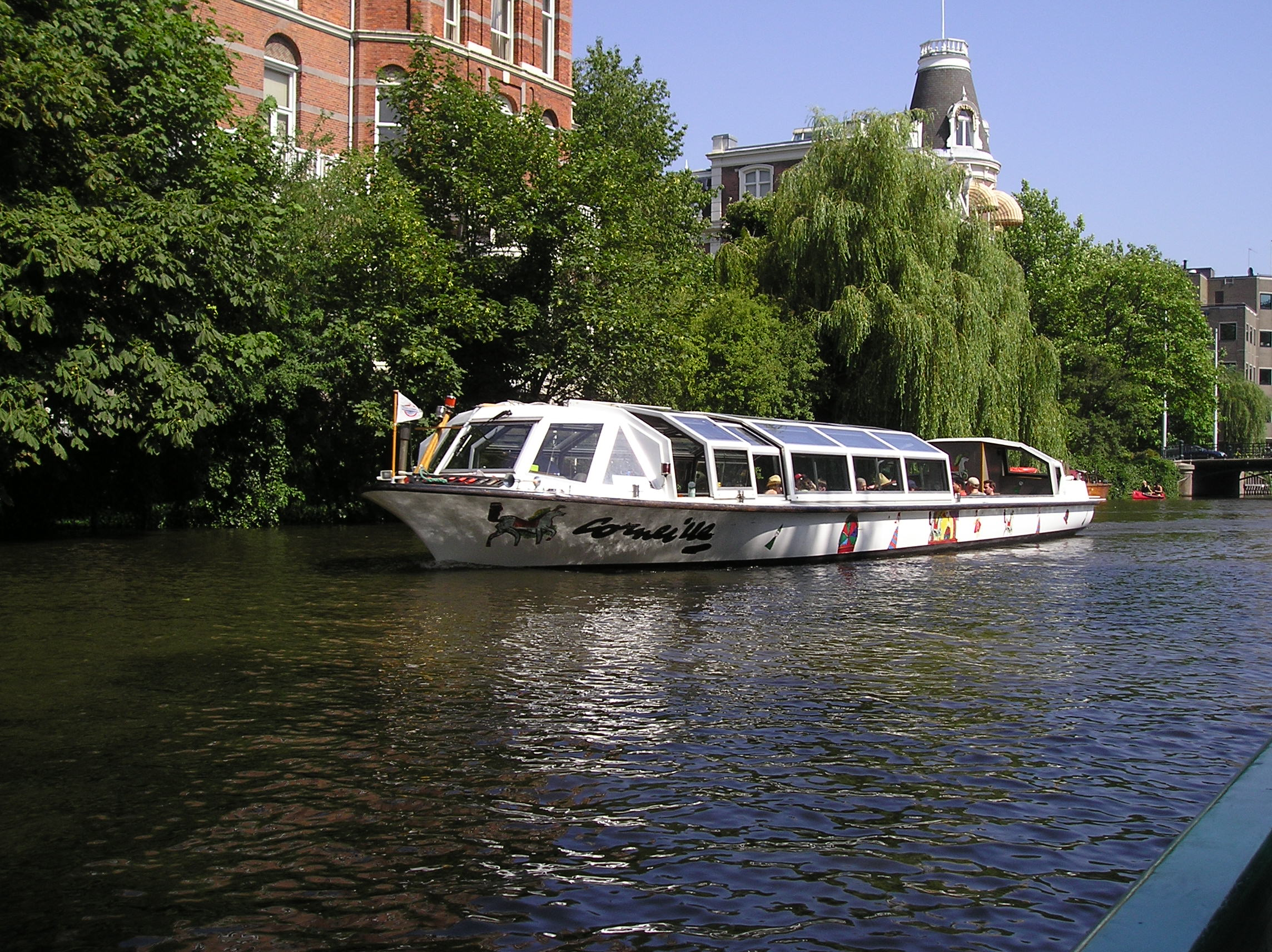
A tour boat passing nearby the Rijksmuseum in Amsterdam

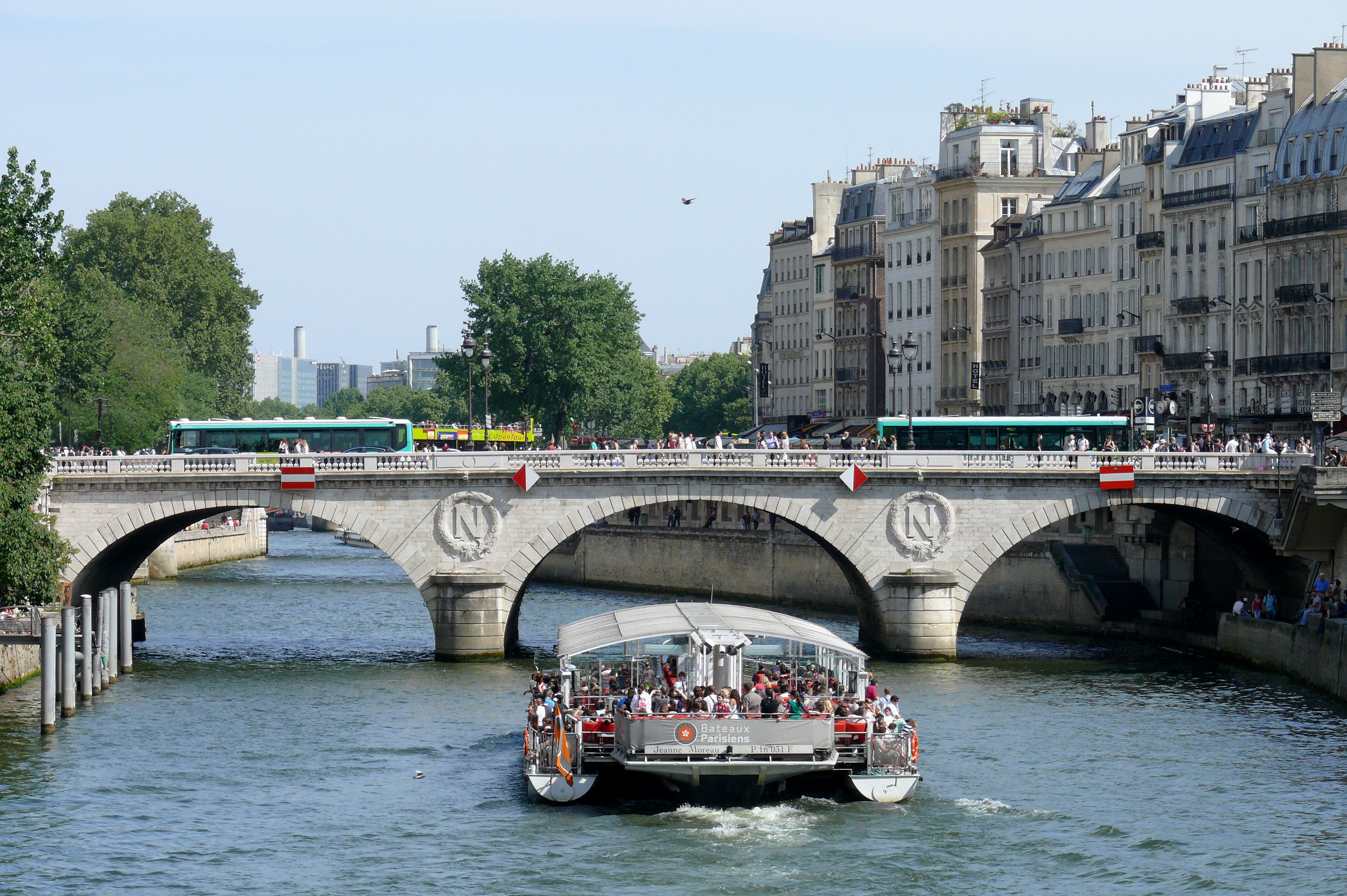
A Bateau Mouche excursion boat on the Seine

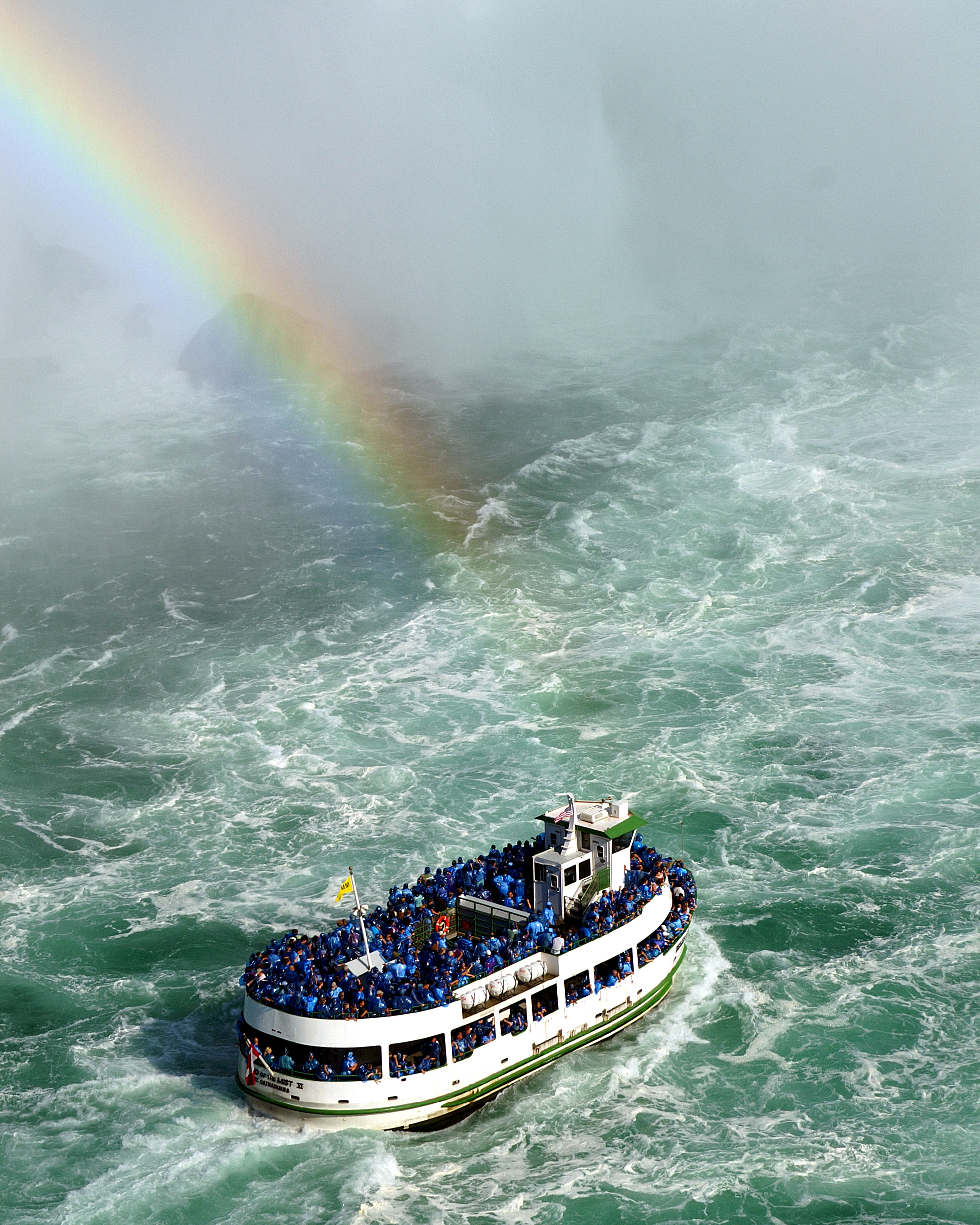
Maid of the Mist tourboat for the Niagara Falls

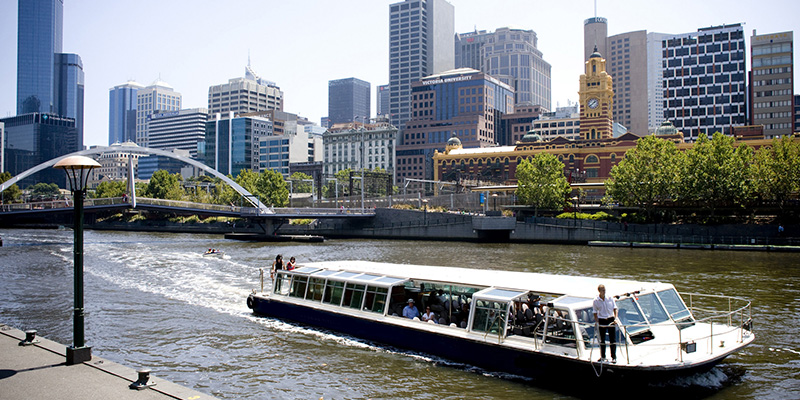
A flat boat is seen cruising along the Yarra River in Melbourne, Australia

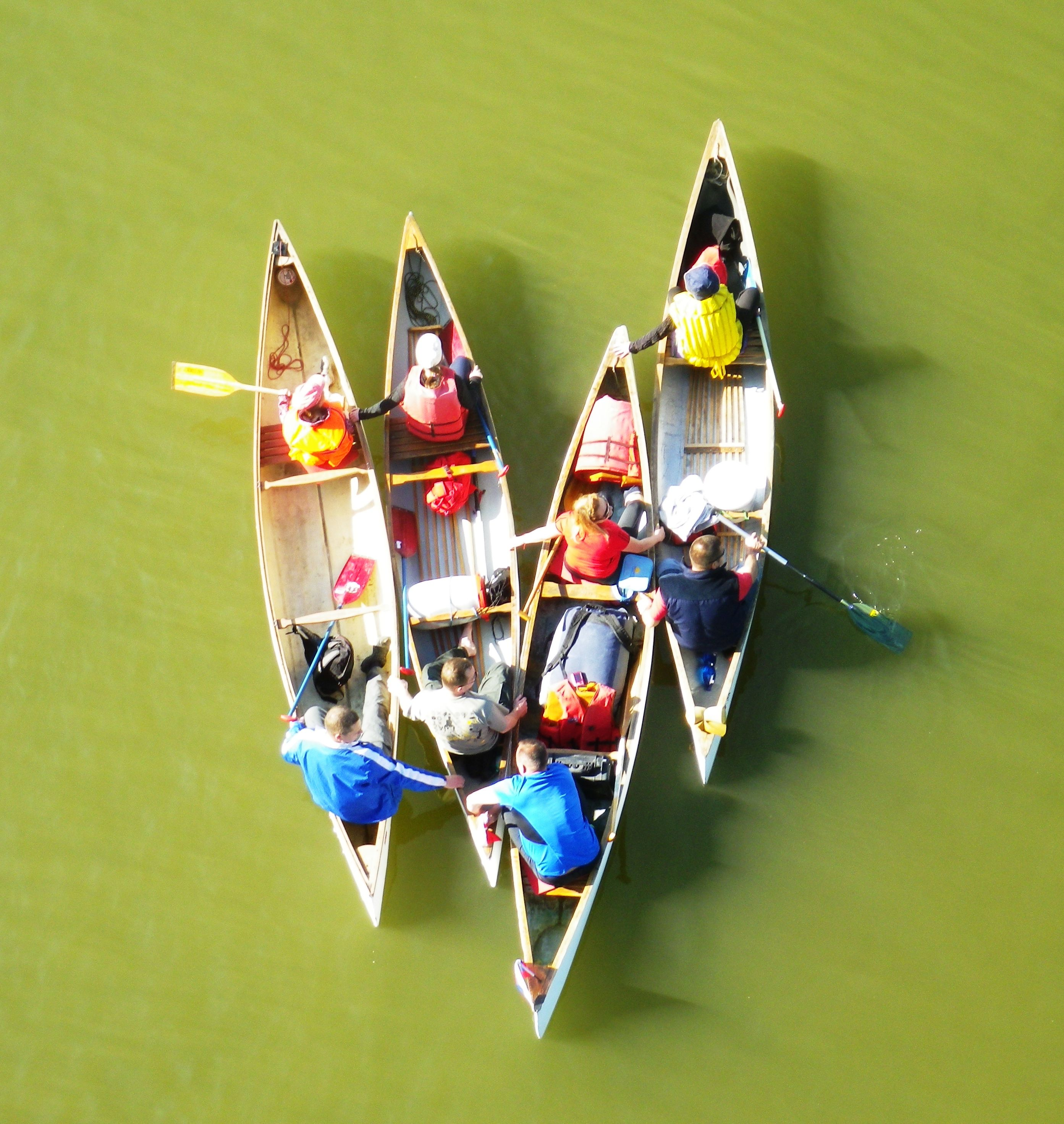
Water tourist on Danube river in Slovakia, in Komárno.
