= Suchdol nad Lužnicí =

- Town
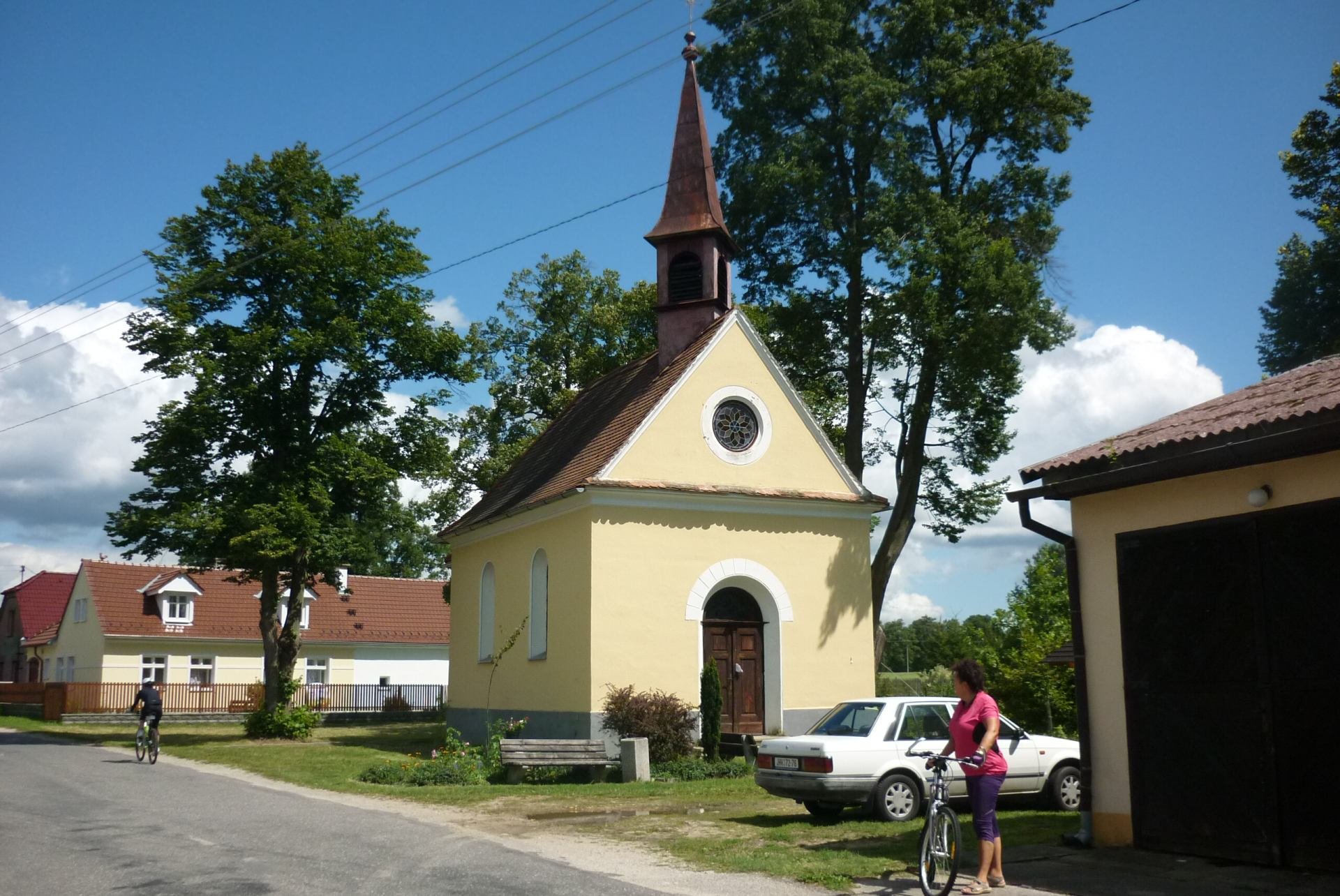
- Klikov, a part of Suchdol nad Lužnicí

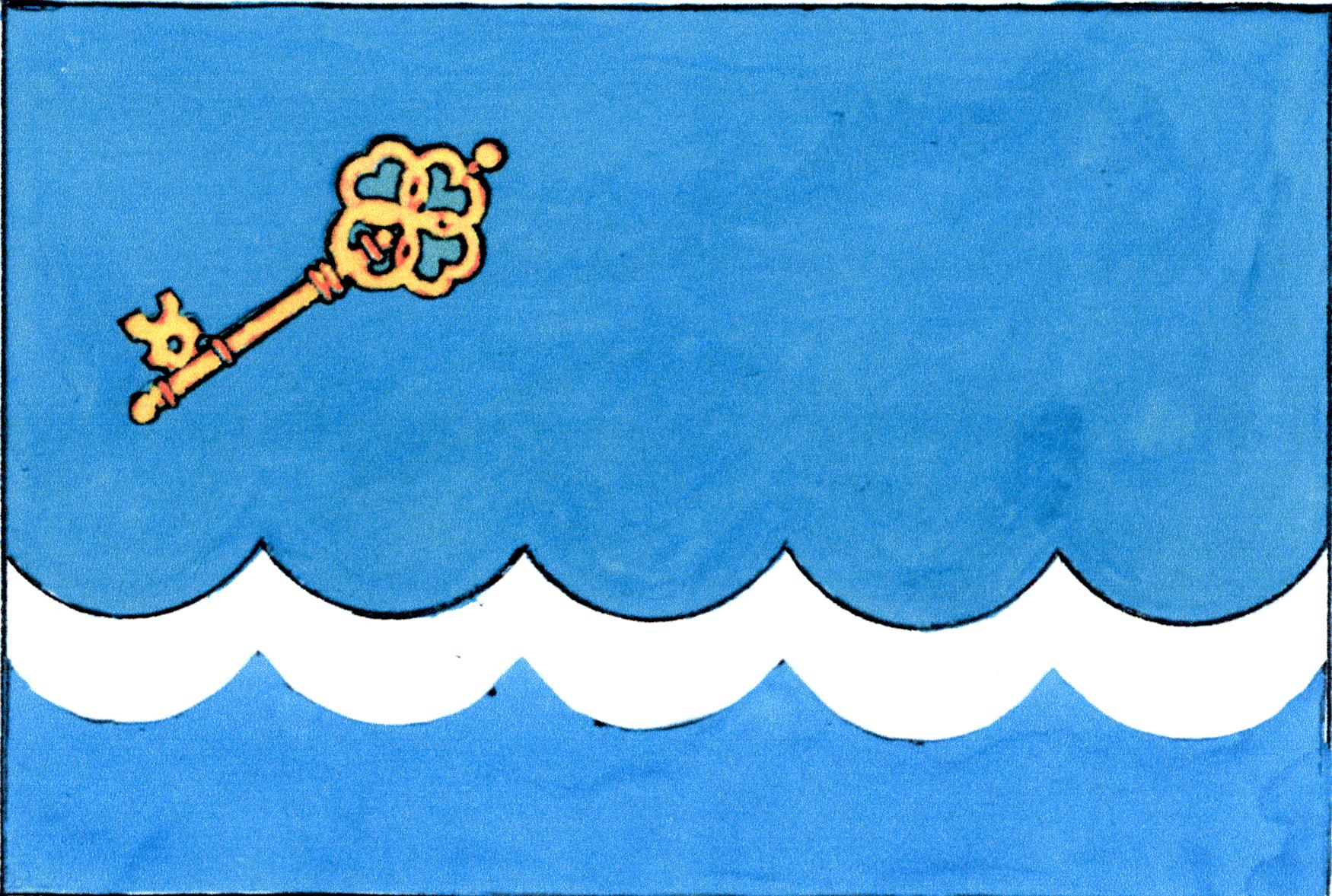
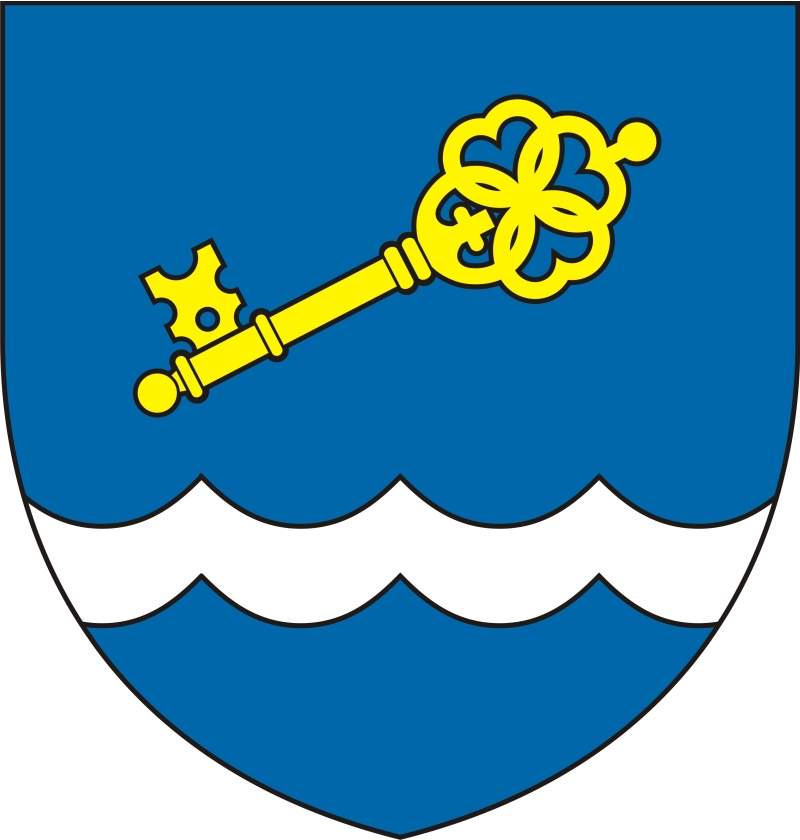
- Flag Coat of arms

- Location in the Czech Republic
- Coordinates: 48°53′44″N 14°52′25″E
- Country: Czech Republic
- Region: South Bohemian
- District: Jindřichův Hradec
- First mentioned: 1362

Government
  - Mayor: Ladislav Kotrba

Area
  - Total: 63.58 km^{2} (24.55 sq mi)
- Elevation: 454 m (1,490 ft)

Population (2026-01-01)
  - Total: 3,559
  - Density: 55.98/km^{2} (145.0/sq mi)
- Time zone: UTC+1 (CET)
  - Summer (DST): UTC+2 (CEST)
- Postal code: 378 06
- Website: www.suchdol.cz

Suchdol nad Lužnicí (Czech pronunciation: [ˈsuɦdol ˈnad luʒɲɪtsiː]; German: Suchenthal) is a town in Jindřichův Hradec District in the South Bohemian Region of the Czech Republic. It has about 3,600 inhabitants. The town is located on the Lužnice River in the Třeboň Basin.

== Administrative division ==
Suchdol nad Lužnicí consists of six municipal parts (in brackets population according to the 2021 census):

- Suchdol nad Lužnicí (2,696)
- Bor (52)
- Františkov (89)
- Hrdlořezy (133)
- Klikov (226)
- Tušť (289)

== Etymology ==
The name Suchdol is derived from suchý důl, i.e. 'dry valley'.

== Geography ==
Suchdol nad Lužnicí is located about 28 kilometres (17 mi) southwest of Jindřichův Hradec and 29 km (18 mi) southeast of České Budějovice. It lies in the Třeboň Basin and in the Třeboňsko Protected Landscape Area. The highest point is at 501 m (1,644 ft) above sea level.

The town is situated on the Lužnice River. The Dračice River flows through the eastern part of the municipal territory (through Františkov and Klikov), before it joins the Lužnice northeast of the town proper. There are several fishponds and flooded quarries in the municipal territory.

== History ==
The first written mention of Suchdol nad Lužnicí is from 1362, when it was bought by the Rosenberg family and joined to the Třeboň estate. The last member of the Rosenberg family died in 1611 and Suchdol was then inherited by the Schwamberg family. After the Battle of White Mountain (1620), properties of the Schwambergs were confiscated by Ferdinand II. The village was owned by the Habsburg family until 1660, when it was bought by the Schwarzenberg family.

In 1876, the village was promoted to a market town. In 2005, Suchdol nad Lužnicí became a town.

== Demographics ==
Historical population

Year	Pop.	±%
1869	4,103	—
1880	4,742	+15.6%
1890	4,867	+2.6%
1900	5,147	+5.8%
1910	5,327	+3.5%

Year	Pop.	±%
1921	4,914	−7.8%
1930	4,630	−5.8%
1950	3,579	−22.7%
1961	3,593	+0.4%
1970	3,580	−0.4%

Year	Pop.	±%
1980	3,615	+1.0%
1991	3,634	+0.5%
2001	3,647	+0.4%
2011	3,605	−1.2%
2021	3,485	−3.3%

Source: Censuses

== Transport ==
Suchdol nad Lužnicí is located on the railway line Veselí nad Lužnicí–České Velenice.

== Sights ==
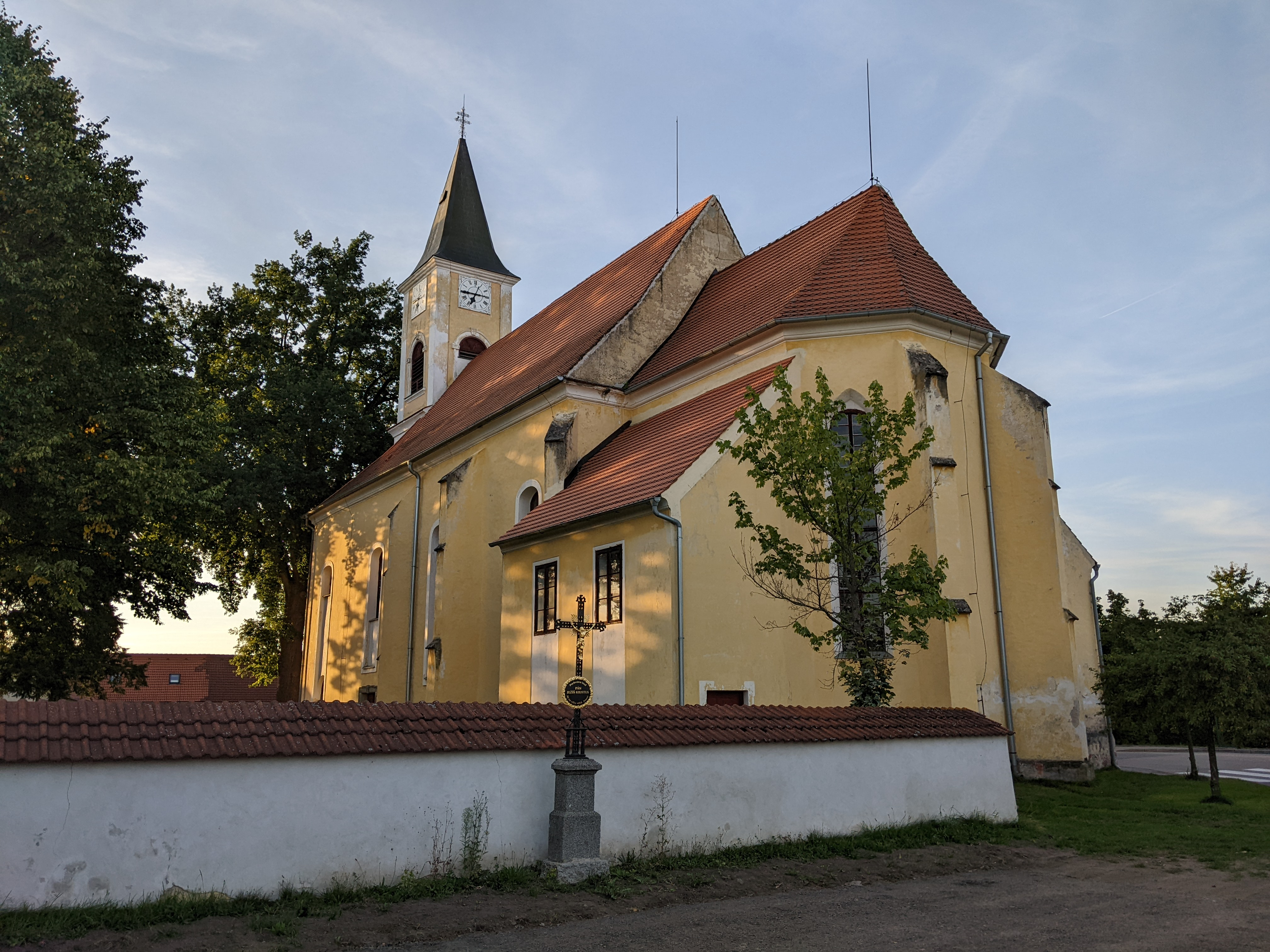
Church of Saint Nicholas

The main landmark of the town is the Church of Saint Nicholas. The oldest part of the church was built in the Gothic style in 1361–1363. It was rebuilt around 1493 and in 1814–1820.

A valuable building is the Chapel of Saint John of Nepomuk. It was built in the late Baroque style from 1728.

== Twin towns – sister cities ==
Suchdol nad Lužnicí is twinned with:

- Brand-Nagelberg, Austria
