= Kunžak =

- Municipality
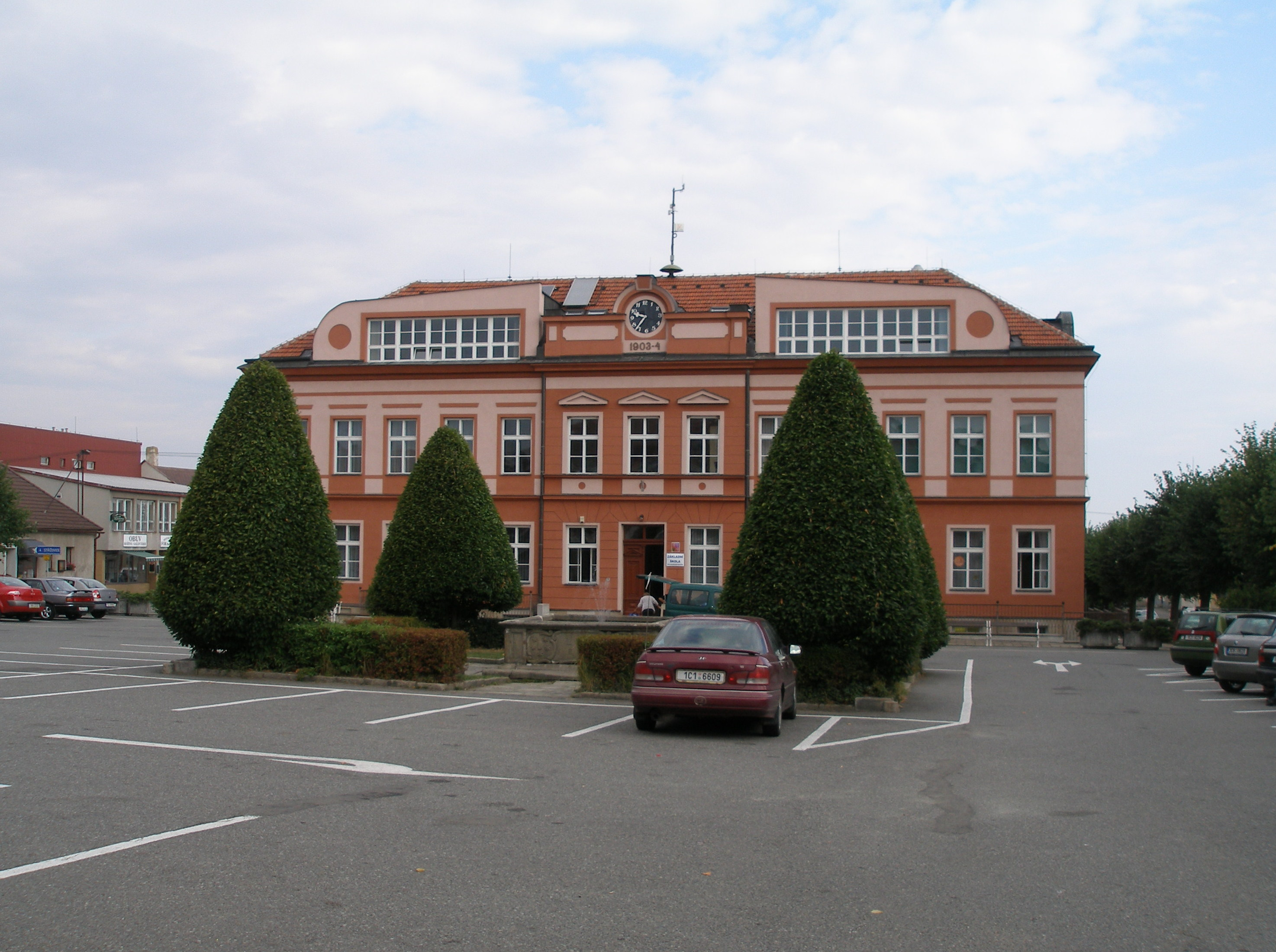
- Primary school on the square

- Flag Coat of arms

- Location in the Czech Republic
- Coordinates: 49°7′16″N 15°11′25″E
- Country: Czech Republic
- Region: South Bohemian
- District: Jindřichův Hradec
- First mentioned: 1288

Area
  - Total: 49.56 km^{2} (19.14 sq mi)
- Elevation: 575 m (1,886 ft)

Population (2026-01-01)
  - Total: 1,463
  - Density: 29.52/km^{2} (76.46/sq mi)
- Time zone: UTC+1 (CET)
  - Summer (DST): UTC+2 (CEST)
- Postal codes: 378 33, 378 53, 378 62
- Website: www.kunzak.cz

Kunžak is a municipality and village in Jindřichův Hradec District in the South Bohemian Region of the Czech Republic. It has about 1,500 inhabitants.

Kunžak lies approximately 17 kilometres (11 mi) east of Jindřichův Hradec, 55 km (34 mi) east of České Budějovice, and 122 km (76 mi) south-east of Prague. The Dračice River and the stream Koštěnický potok originate in the municipal territory.

== Administrative division ==
Kunžak consists of seven municipal parts (in brackets population according to the 2021 census):

- Kunžak (1,163)
- Kaproun (6)
- Mosty (83)
- Suchdol (14)
- Terezín (4)
- Valtínov (93)
- Zvůle (19)

== Demographics ==
Historical population
Year	Pop.	±%
1869	3,988	—
1880	3,894	−2.4%
1890	3,732	−4.2%
1900	3,680	−1.4%
1910	3,465	−5.8%
1921	3,097	−10.6%
1930	2,765	−10.7%
1950	1,832	−33.7%
1961	1,788	−2.4%
1970	1,680	−6.0%
1980	1,561	−7.1%
1991	1,490	−4.5%
2001	1,459	−2.1%
2011	1,442	−1.2%
2021	1,382	−4.2%
Source: Censuses
