= Lužnice (river) =

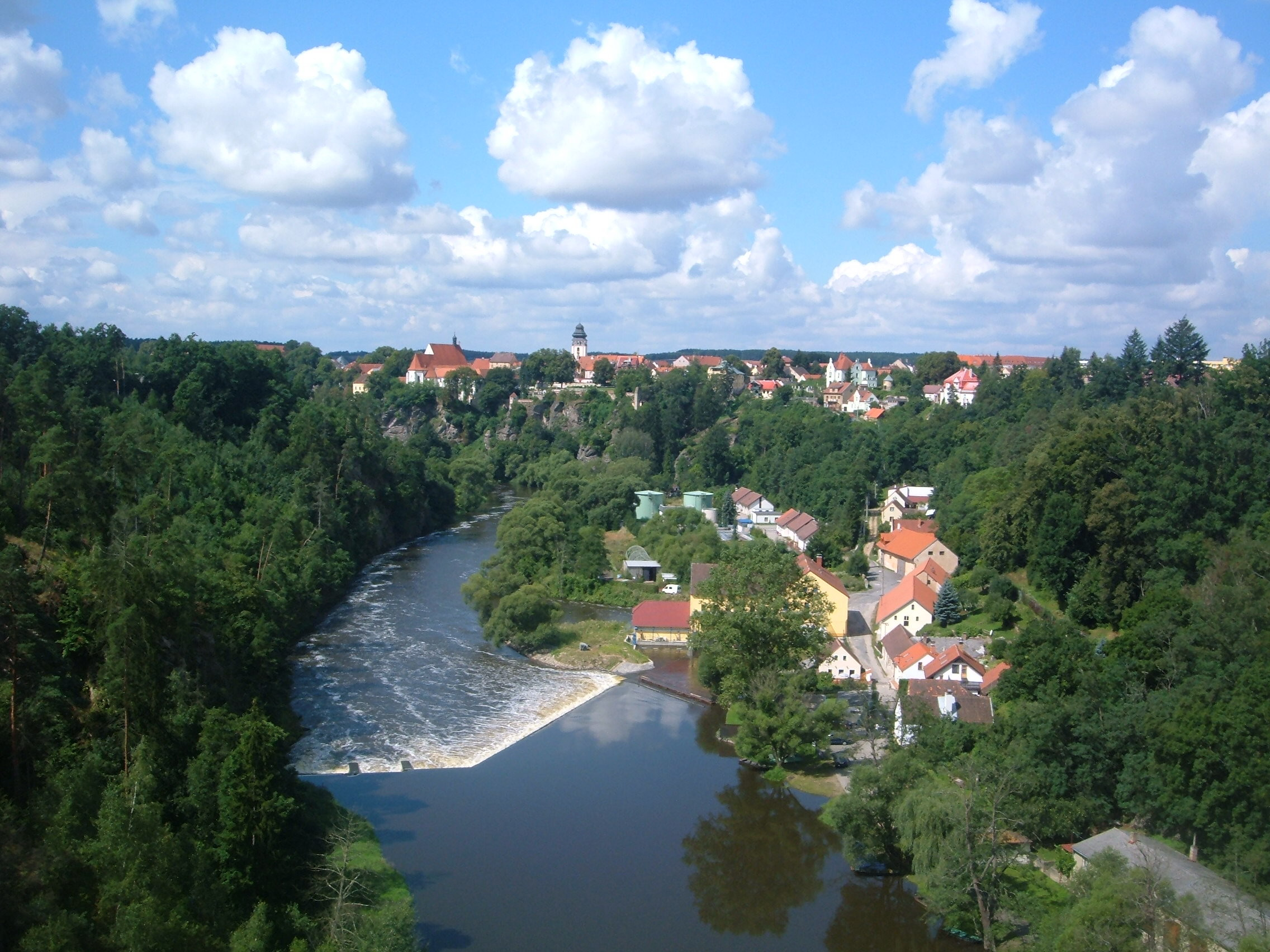
- The Lužnice near Bechyně

Location
- Countries: Czech Republic; Austria
- Regions/ States: South Bohemian; Lower Austria

Physical characteristics
- Source
  - location: Bad Großpertholz, Gratzen Mountains
  - coordinates: 48°35′44″N 14°44′14″E
  - elevation: 970 m (3,180 ft)
- Mouth
  - location: Vltava
  - coordinates: 49°13′51″N 14°23′23″E
  - elevation: 352 m (1,155 ft)
- Length: 197.9 km (123.0 mi)
- Basin size: 4,234.7 km^{2} (1,635.0 sq mi)
- Discharge
  - average: 24.3 m^{3}/s (860 cu ft/s) near estuary

Basin features
- Progression: Vltava→ Elbe→ North Sea

The Lužnice (Czech pronunciation: [ˈluʒɲɪtsɛ]; German: Lainsitz) is a river in the Czech Republic and Austria, a right tributary of the Vltava River. It flows through Lower Austria and the South Bohemian Region. It is 197.9 km (123.0 mi) long, of which 157.7 km (98.0 mi) is in the Czech Republic, making it the 11th longest river in the Czech Republic.

== Etymology ==
The name of the river is derived from the Czech word luh (i.e. 'wet meadow'), meaning "the river that flows through wet meadows". The first written mention of the river is from 1179.

== Characteristic ==
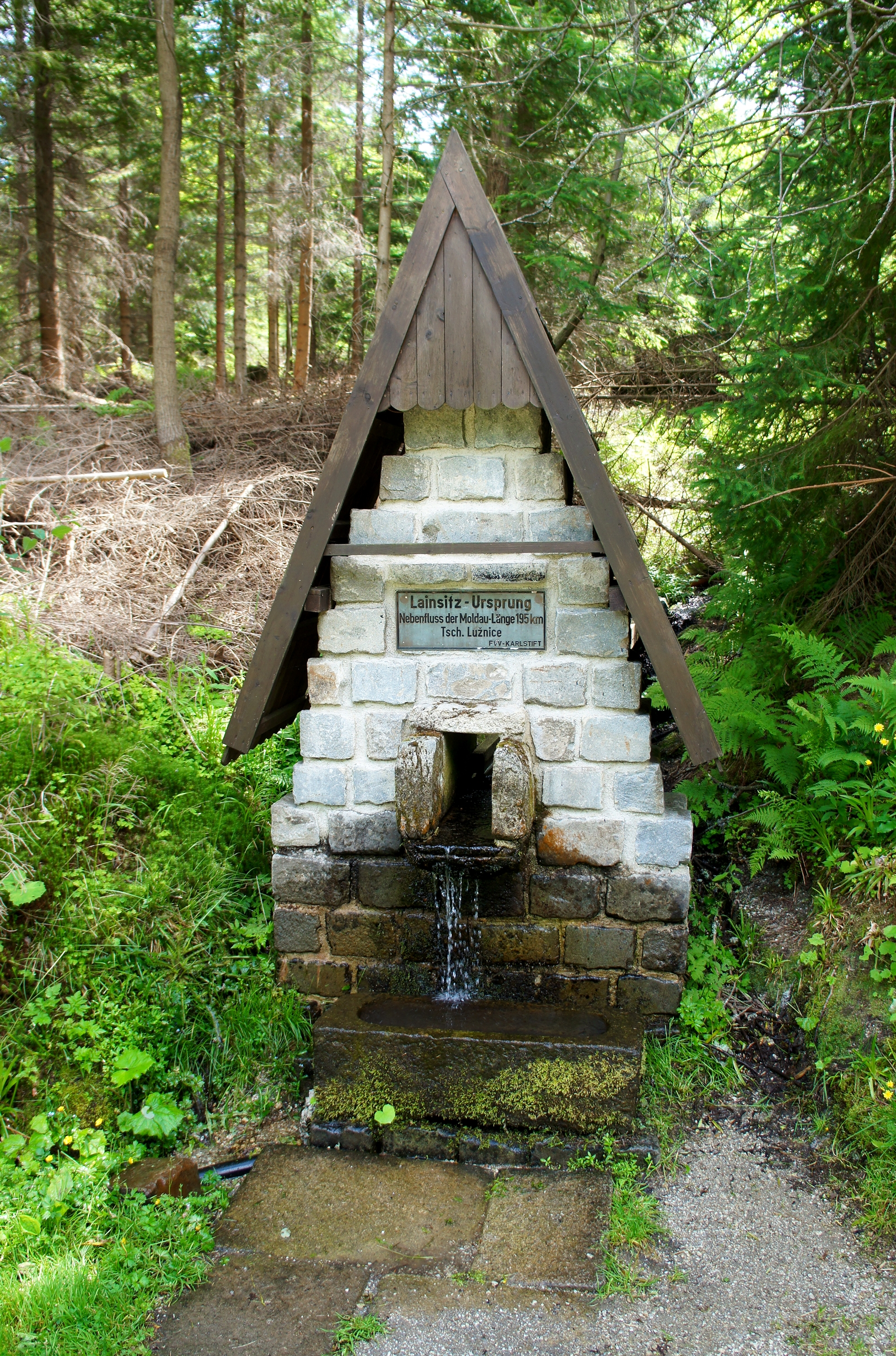
Spring of the Lužnice

The Lužnice originates in the territory of Bad Großpertholz in the Gratzen Mountains at an elevation of 970 m (3,180 ft) and flows to Hosty, where it enters the Vltava River at an elevation of 352 m (1,155 ft). It is 197.9 km (123.0 mi) long, of which 157.7 km (98.0 mi) is in the Czech Republic. About 2.2 km (1.4 mi) of the river forms the Austrian–Czech border. Its drainage basin has an area of 4,234.7 km^{2} (1,635.0 sq mi), of which 3,256.4 km^{2} (1,257.3 sq mi) is in the Czech Republic.

The longest tributaries of the Lužnice are:

Tributary	Length (km)	River km	Side
Nežárka	56.0	74.5	right
Dračice / Reißbach	51.0	123.0	right
Smutná	47.8	10.7	right
Koštěnický potok	43.3	115.6	right
Braunaubach / Skřemelice	42.0	157.0	right
Černovický potok	40.3	64.2	right
Dírenský potok	35.3	66.7	right
Chotovinský potok	33.6	43.8	right
Miletínský potok	26.5	85.4	left
Bilinský potok	25.9	5.0	right
Košínský potok	23.5	39.3	right
Bechyňský potok	20.8	73.9	left
Židova strouha	20.1	9.1	left

== Course ==
The most notable settlement on the river is the town of Tábor. The river originates in the territory of Bad Großpertholz (Austria), then it crosses the Austrian–Czech border and flows through Pohorská Ves, then it returns to Austria and flows through Sankt Martin, Weitra and Unserfrau-Altweitra before it creates the Austrian–Czech border between the territories of Gmünd and České Velenice.

After that, the river definitely turns north into the Czech Republic and flows past the towns of Suchdol nad Lužnicí, Třeboň, Veselí nad Lužnicí, Soběslav, Planá nad Lužnicí, Sezimovo Ústí, Tábor (where the river turns back to the southwest), Bechyně and Týn nad Vltavou.

== Bodies of water ==
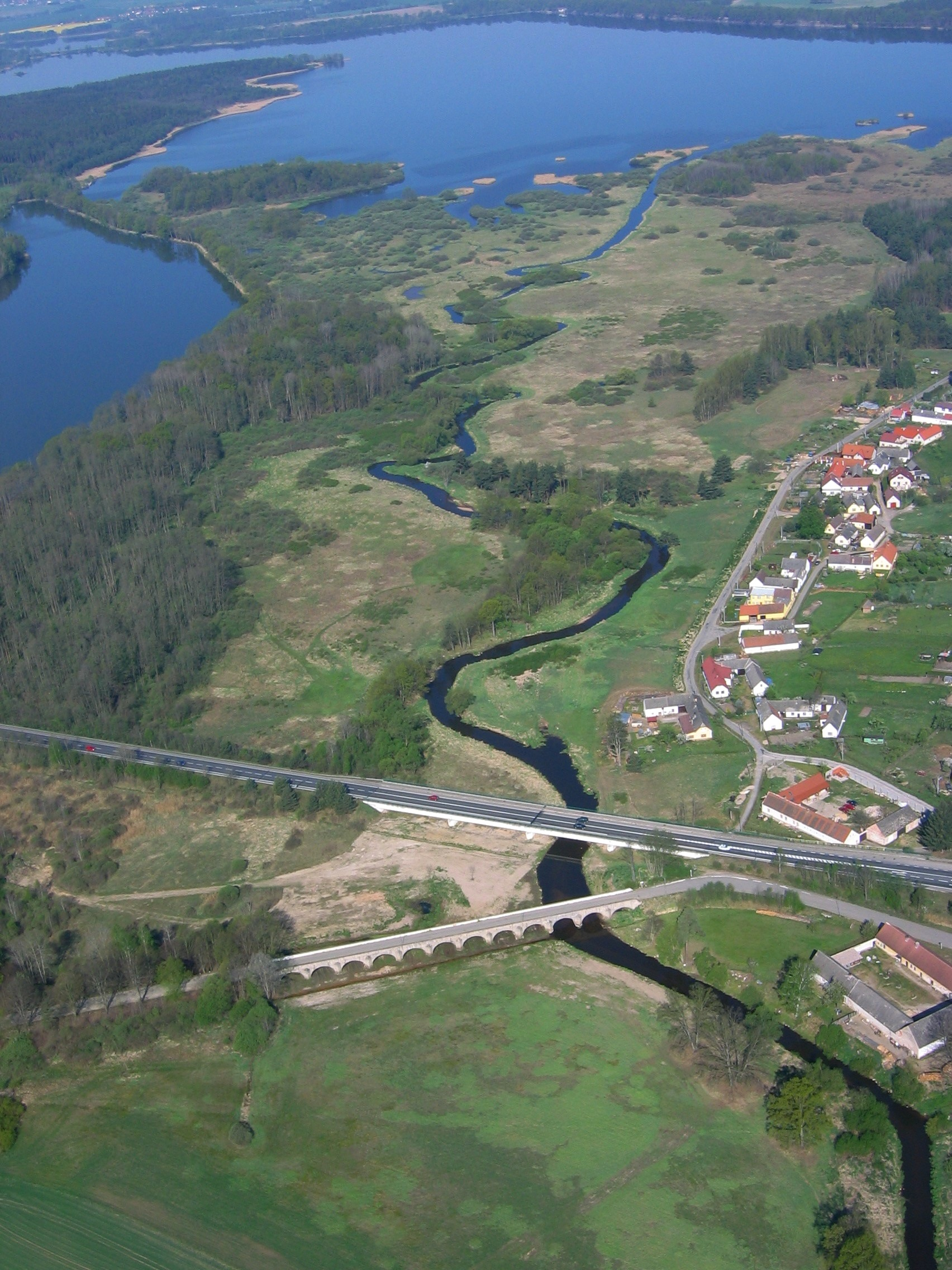
Rožmberk Pond on the river; inundation bridge at Stará Hlína in the foreground

The Lužnice flows through the Třeboň Basin, which is known for its fishponds. There are 6,408 bodies of water in the basin area. The largest of them is the largest fishpond in the world, Rožmberk Pond with an area of 489 ha (1,210 acres), which is located directly on the Lužnice. A small water reservoir, Kořensko, is built in the area of the confluence of the Lužnice and Vltava. In the area of the Třeboň Basin, the river meanders significantly and beside the fishponds, the area around the river in this area is rich in small oxbow lakes.

== Nature ==
A long section of the river forms the axis of the Třeboňsko Protected Landscape Area. Within this area, the nature reserve of Horní Lužnice is delimited in the immediate vicinity of a 16-km long stretch of the river. It has an area of 395.1 ha (976 acres). The subject of protection is the river and its floodplain with various types of wetland and meadow species. It is one of the last extensive locations in Central Europe of this type. The territory is important mainly for the integrity of the hydrological regime and for many rare, endangered or otherwise important wetland species.

The riverbed in the section between Veselí nad Lužnicí (where Třeboňsko PLA ends) to the mouth of the river is protected as Lužnice Nature Monument with an area of 432.2 ha (1,068 acres). The reason for protection is the occurrence of rare and endangered species, especially thick shelled river mussel, weatherfish and Eurasian otter.

The most common fish in the river is common chub. Other numerous fish include common roach, common bleak, gudgeon and in fast-flowing sections common barbel. Rare is the occurrence of burbot.

== Bridges ==
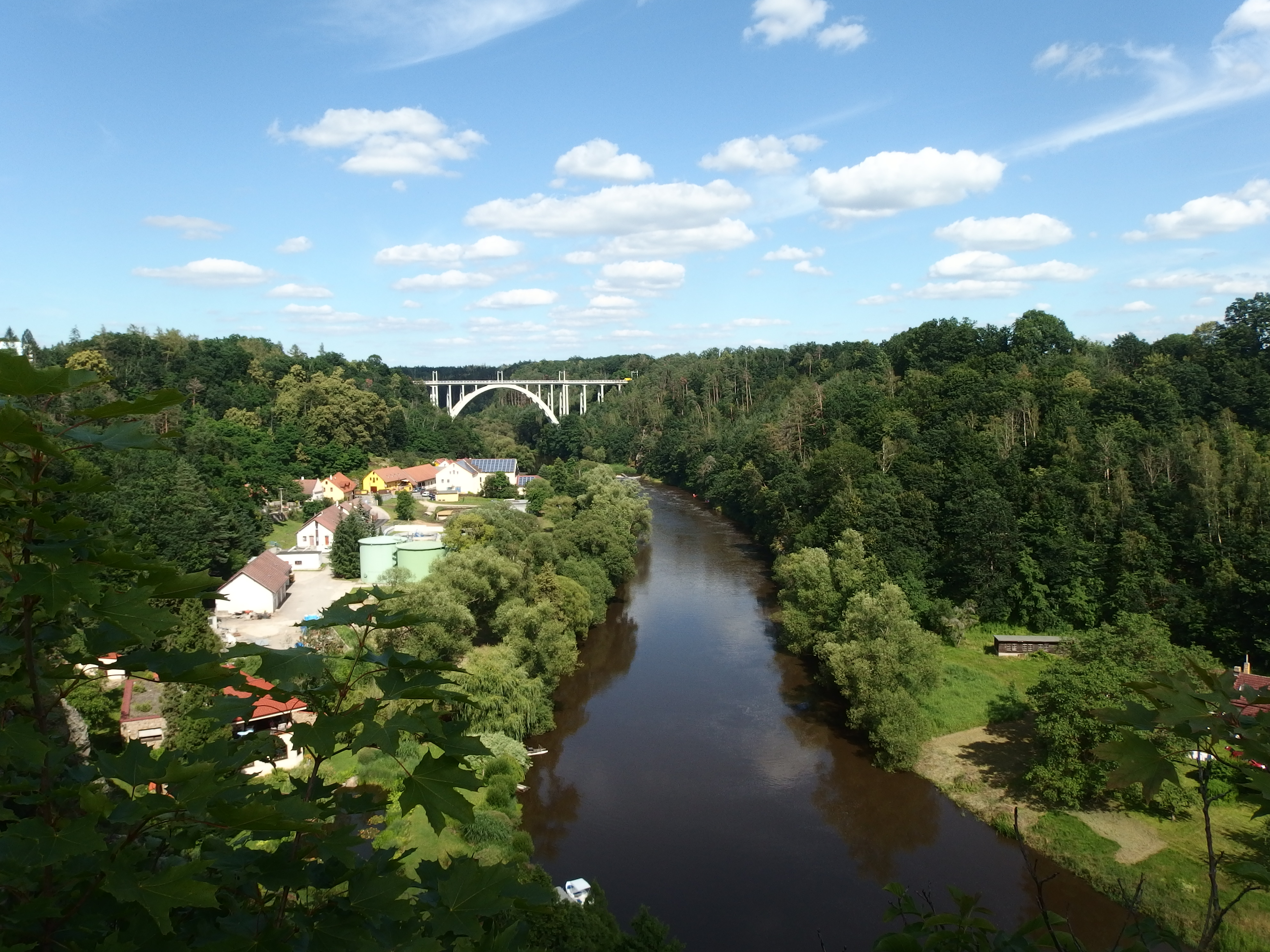
View towards the Bechyně Bridge

The Lužnice is spanned by the rare Stádlec Suspension Bridge, which connects Stádlec with the village of Dobřejice (a part of Malšice). The bridge is protected as a national cultural monument.

At Bechyně, the river is spanned by the Bechyně Bridge, a unique reinforced concrete arch bridge. For its value, it is also protected as a national cultural monument.

At the village of Stará Hlína (part of Třeboň), the river is spanned by a stone inundation bridge. It is a valuable twelve-arch bridge from 1799, protected as a cultural monument.

== Tourism ==
The Lužnice is among the most popular rivers for river tourism in the country. It is suitable for beginner paddlers. Both the upper course and the lower course are navigable.
