= Pohorská Ves =

- Municipality
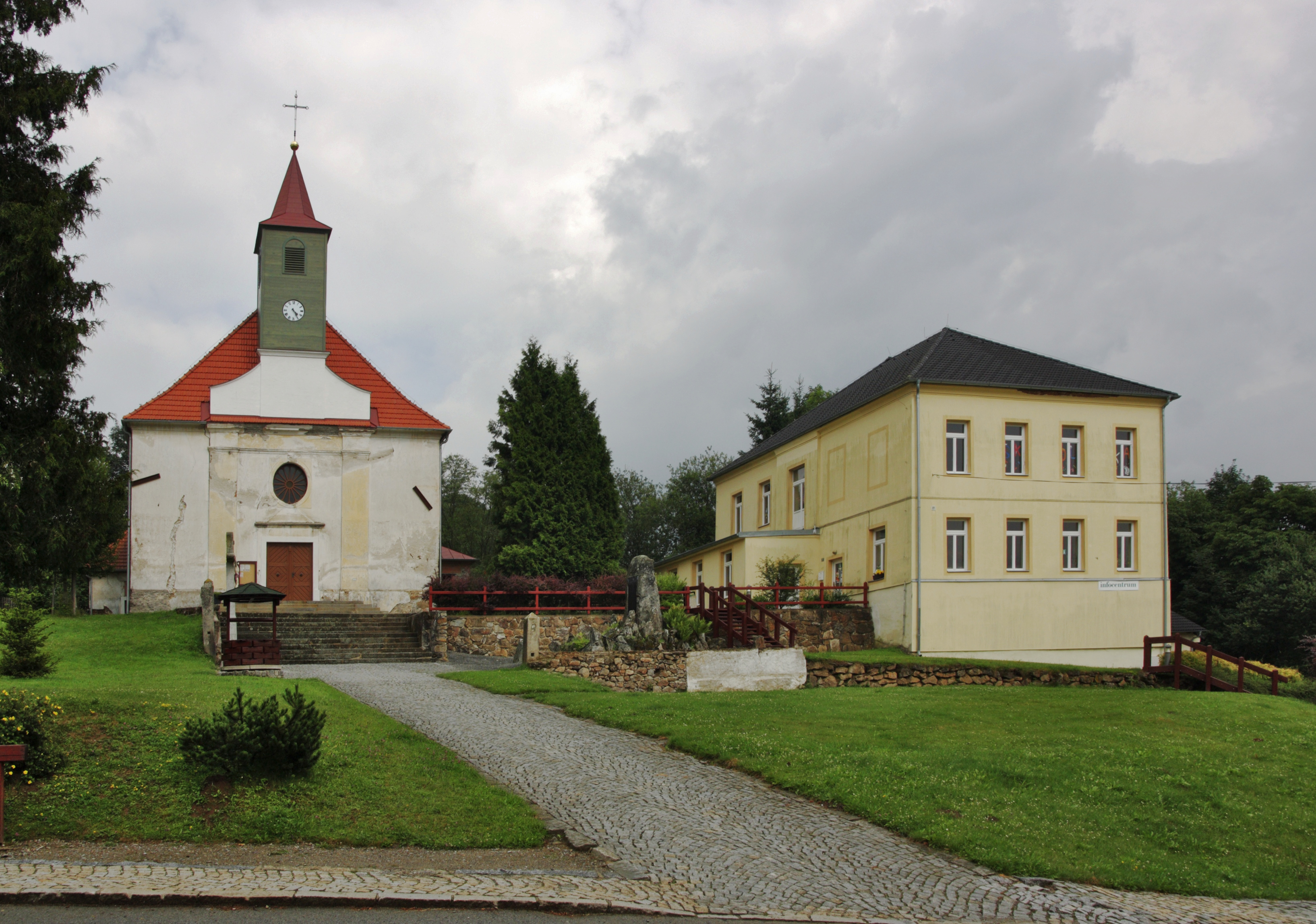
- Church of Saint Leonard and former rectory

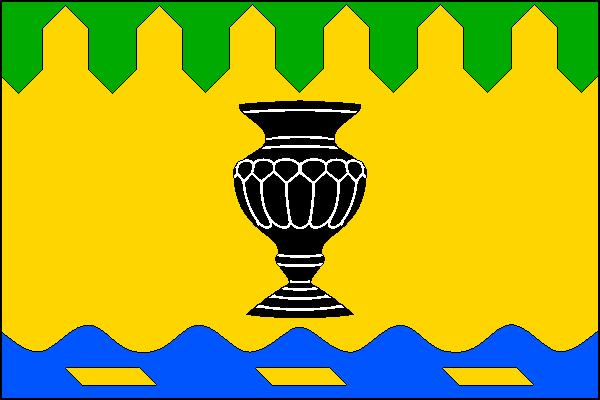
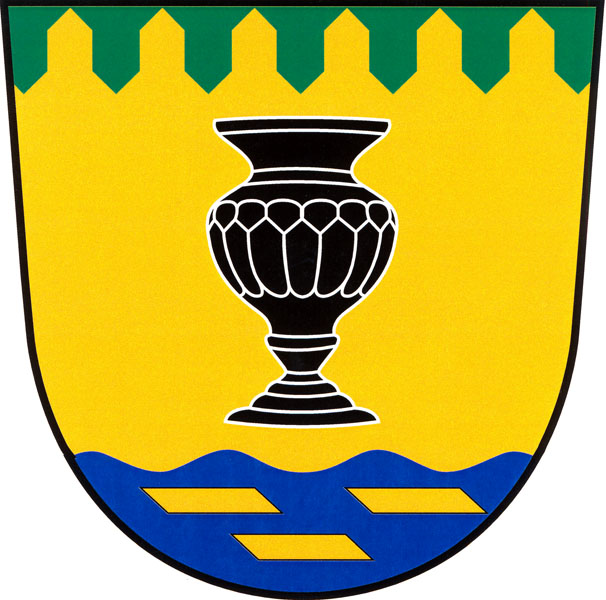
- Flag Coat of arms

- Location in the Czech Republic
- Coordinates: 48°40′12″N 14°38′52″E
- Country: Czech Republic
- Region: South Bohemian
- District: Český Krumlov
- Founded: 1769

Area
  - Total: 81.23 km^{2} (31.36 sq mi)
- Elevation: 760 m (2,490 ft)

Population (2026-01-01)
  - Total: 231
  - Density: 2.84/km^{2} (7.37/sq mi)
- Time zone: UTC+1 (CET)
  - Summer (DST): UTC+2 (CEST)
- Postal code: 382 83
- Website: www.pohorskaves.cz

Pohorská Ves (German: Theresiendorf) is a municipality and village in Český Krumlov District in the South Bohemian Region of the Czech Republic. It has about 200 inhabitants.

Pohorská Ves lies approximately 31 kilometres (19 mi) south-east of Český Krumlov, 39 km (24 mi) south of České Budějovice, and 161 km (100 mi) south of Prague.

== Administrative division ==
Pohorská Ves consists of four municipal parts (in brackets population according to the 2021 census):

- Pohorská Ves (185)
- Janova Ves (10)
- Lužnice (12)
- Pohoří na Šumavě (0)

== Demographics ==
Historical population
| Year | Pop. | ±% |
|---|---|---|
| 1869 | 2,879 | — |
| 1880 | 2,751 | −4.4% |
| 1890 | 2,772 | +0.8% |
| 1900 | 2,770 | −0.1% |
| 1910 | 2,578 | −6.9% |
| 1921 | 2,412 | −6.4% |
| 1930 | 2,202 | −8.7% |
| 1950 | 431 | −80.4% |
| 1961 | 286 | −33.6% |
| 1970 | 306 | +7.0% |
| 1980 | 294 | −3.9% |
| 1991 | 308 | +4.8% |
| 2001 | 323 | +4.9% |
| 2011 | 264 | −18.3% |
| 2021 | 207 | −21.6% |
Source: Censuses
