= Bad Großpertholz =

- Municipality
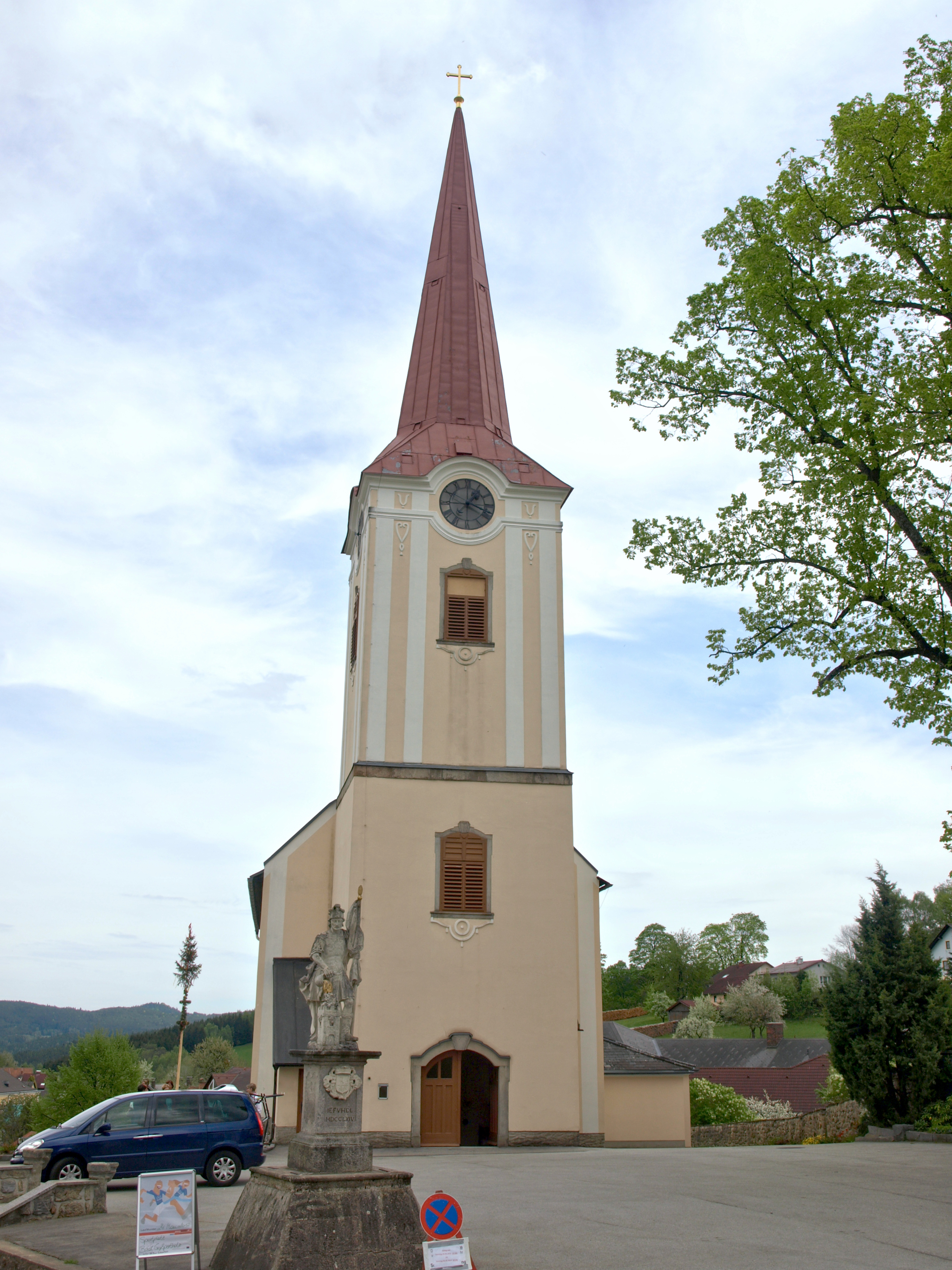
- Saint Bartholomew Church

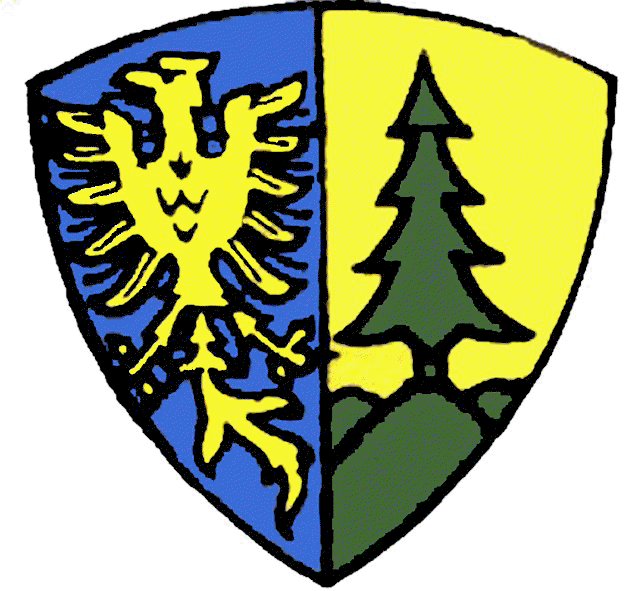
- Coat of arms

- Location within Austria
- Coordinates: 48°38′N 14°50′E
- Country: Austria
- State: Lower Austria
- District: Gmünd

Government
  - Mayor: Klaus Tannhäuser (ÖVP)

Area
  - Total: 82.41 km^{2} (31.82 sq mi)
- Elevation: 714 m (2,343 ft)

Population (2018-01-01)
  - Total: 1,359
  - Density: 16.49/km^{2} (42.71/sq mi)
- Time zone: UTC+1 (CET)
  - Summer (DST): UTC+2 (CEST)
- Postal code: 3972, 3973, 3922
- Area code: 02857, 02816, 02815
- Website: www.bad-grosspertholz.gv.at

Bad Großpertholz is a town in the district of Gmünd in the Austrian state of Lower Austria.

== Geography ==
Bad Großpertholz lies in the northwest Waldviertel in Lower Austria on the Czech border. About 76.39 percent of the municipality is forested.

== History ==
Großpertholz was founded in the mid-12th century by Berthold von Schiefern-Arnstein, whose father Ulrich had received the area through a royal grant for cultivation. Berthold had a fortified house built to protect the settlement. This was expanded into a castle in the 17th century.
