= Gradec =

Gradec or Gradets may refer to:

== Albania ==
- Gradec, Gjerbës, a village in the administrative unit Gjerbës, Skrapar municipality, Berat County
- Gradec, Qendër Skrapar, a village in the administrative unit Qendër Skrapar, Skrapar municipality, Berat County
- Gradec, Dibër, a village in the municipality of Dibër, Dibër County
- Gradec, Shkodër, a village in the municipality of Malësi e Madhe, Shkodër County

== Austria ==
- Gradec, Austria, the Slovene name of the city of Graz

== Bulgaria ==
- Gradets, Sliven Province
- Polski Gradets, Stara Zagora Province

== Croatia ==
- Gradec, Zagreb, a neighborhood in the city center
- Gradec, Zagreb County, a village and a municipality near Vrbovec
- Gradec Pokupski, a village near Pisarovina

== North Macedonia ==
- Gradec, Kriva Palanka
- Gradec, Valandovo
- Gradec, Vinica
- Gradec, Vrapčište

== Slovenia ==
- Gradec, Črnomelj, now part of Rožič Vrh
- Gradec, Krško
- Gradec, Litija
- Gradec, Pivka
- Marija Gradec, in the Municipality of Laško
- Polhov Gradec, the administrative seat of the Municipality of Dobrova–Polhov Gradec
- Pusti Gradec, in the Municipality of Črnomelj
- Slovenj Gradec, a town in northern Slovenia, the administrative seat of the Municipality of Slovenj Gradec

== See also ==
- Hradec (disambiguation) (in Czech place names)
- Gradac (disambiguation)
