= Koštěnický potok =

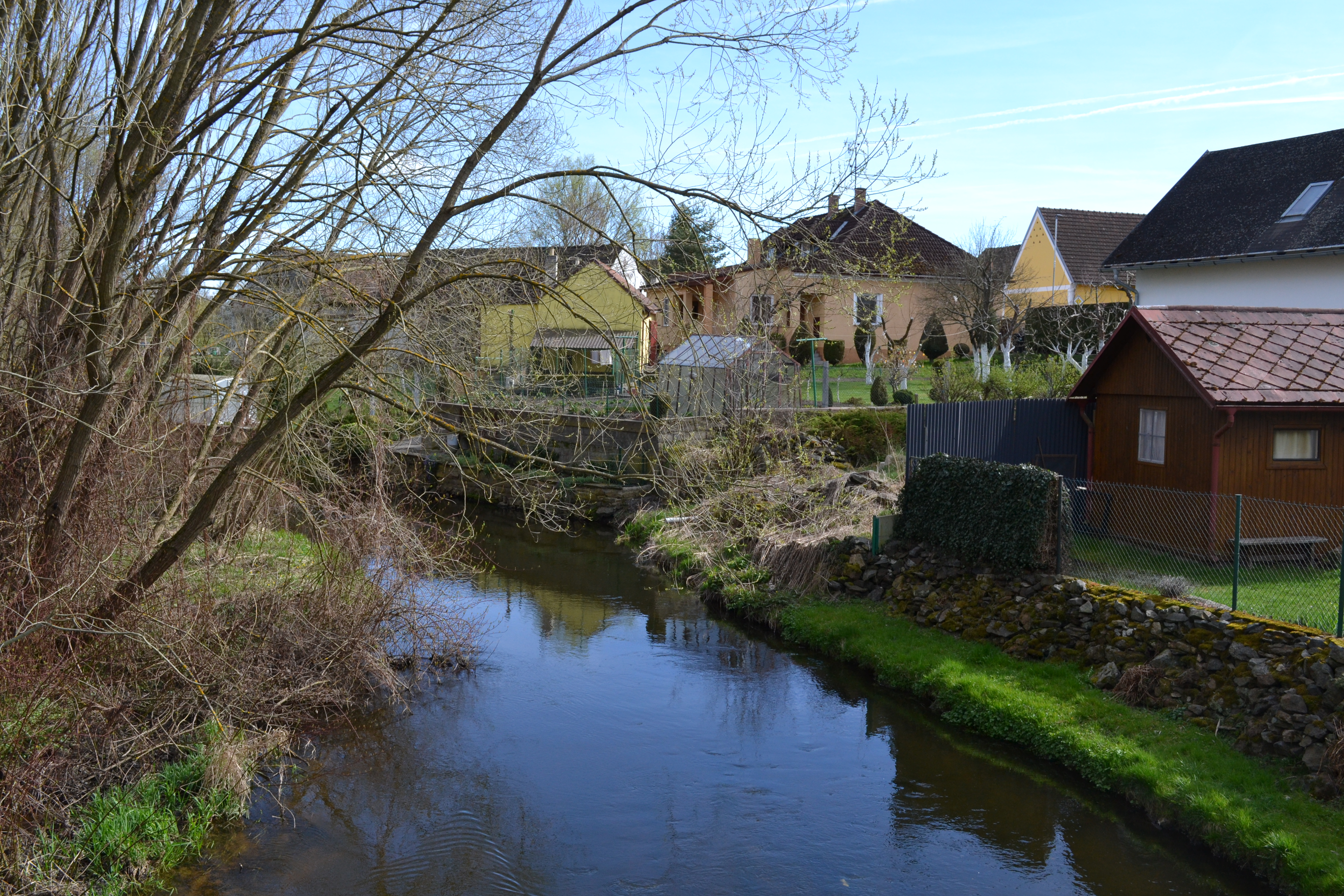
- The Koštěnický potok in Hamr

Location
- Country: Czech Republic
- Region: South Bohemian

Physical characteristics
- Source
  - location: Kunžak, Javořice Highlands
  - coordinates: 49°5′0″N 15°11′9″E
  - elevation: 678 m (2,224 ft)
- Mouth
  - location: Lužnice
  - coordinates: 48°57′17″N 14°52′32″E
  - elevation: 438 m (1,437 ft)
- Length: 43.3 km (26.9 mi)
- Basin size: 125.4 km^{2} (48.4 sq mi)
- Discharge
  - average: 0.97 m^{3}/s (34 cu ft/s) near estuary

Basin features
- Progression: Lužnice→ Vltava→ Elbe→ North Sea

The Koštěnický potok (German: Neumühlbach) is a stream in the Czech Republic, a right tributary of the Lužnice River. It flows through the South Bohemian Region, and a short section forms the Austrian–Czech state border. It is 43.3 km (26.9 mi) long.

== Characteristic ==
The Koštěnický potok originates in the territory of Kunžak in the Javořice Highlands at an elevation of 678 m (2,224 ft) and flows to Majdalena, where it enters the Lužnice River at an elevation of 438 m (1,437 ft). It is 43.3 km (26.9 mi) long. Its drainage basin has an area of 125.4 km^{2} (48.4 sq mi). The average discharge at 3.2 river km in Hamr is 0.82 m^{3}/s (29 cu ft/s).

The longest tributaries of the Koštěnický potok are:

Tributary	Length (km)	Side
Lhotský potok	11.2	left
Vodoteč I	7.2	left
Pstruhový potok	5.3	right

== Course ==
The stream flows through the municipal territories of Kunžak, Člunek, Kačlehy, Číměř, Nová Bystřice, Stráž nad Nežárkou, Staňkov, Chlum u Třeboně, Hamr and Majdalena.

A section of the stream between Stráž nad Nežárkou and Haugschlag with a length of about 1.5 km (0.9 mi) forms the Austrian–Czech state border. The confluence of the Koštěnický potok with Červený potok is the northernmost point of Austria.

== Bodies of water ==
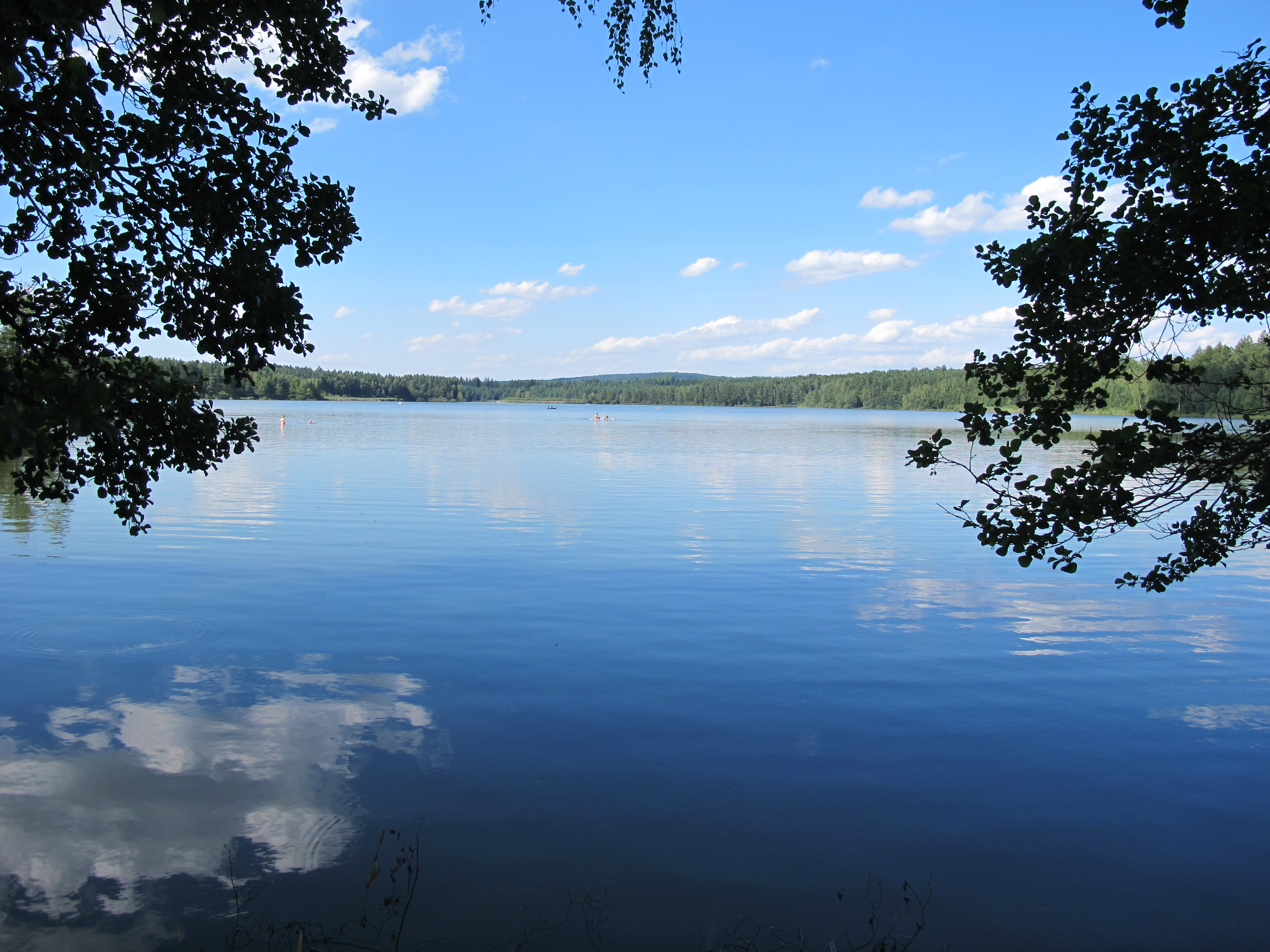
Staňkovský rybník

There are 224 bodies of water in the basin area. The basin area is rich in fishponds and many of them are built directly on the Koštěnický potok. The largest of them are Staňkovský rybník with an area of 197 ha (490 acres) and Kačležský rybník with an area of 181 ha (450 acres), both of them being among the largest fishponds in the Czech Republic.

== Protection of nature ==
The lower course of the stream flows through the Třeboňsko Protected Landscape Area.

The middle course of the stream with its surroundings, located near the Austrian–Czech border, is protected a nature monument. The nature monument is also called Koštěnický potok and has an area of 27.9 ha (69 acres). The reason of protection is the preserved ecosystem of the stream and its floodplain with the occurrence of endangered species of plants and animals, especially the green snaketail.

== See also ==
- List of rivers of the Czech Republic
