= Hamr =

Hamr may refer to:

- Hamr (folklore), in Norse mythology and Nordic folklore, a shape, form or figure someone can shift into
- Heat-assisted magnetic recording (HAMR), a technology for hard disk data storage

== Places in the Czech Republic ==
- Hamr (Jindřichův Hradec District), a municipality and village in the South Bohemian Region
- Hamr na Jezeře, a municipality and village in the Liberec Region
- Hamr, a village and part of Litvínov in the Ústí nad Labem Region
- Hamr, a village and part of Val (Tábor District) in the South Bohemian Region

== See also ==
- Hamry (disambiguation)
