= Gradec, Albania =

Gradec is the name of three villages in Albania:

- Gradec, Gjerbës, in Skrapar municipality, Berat County
- Gradec, Qendër Skrapar, in Skrapar municipality, Berat County
- Gradec, Shkodër, in Kastrat municipality, Shkodër County
