= Hamry =

Hamry (i.e. "hammer mills" in Czech) may refer to places in the Czech Republic:

- Hamry (Chrudim District), a municipality and village in the Pardubice Region
- Hamry (Klatovy District), a municipality and village in the Plzeň Region
- Hamry, a village and part of Bystré (Svitavy District) in the Pardubice Region
- Hamry, a village and part of Hradec (Havlíčkův Brod District) in the Vysočina Region
- Hamry, a village and part of Plumlov in the Olomouc Region
- Hamry nad Sázavou, a municipality and village in the Vysočina Region
- Kryštofovy Hamry, a municipality and village in the Ústí nad Labem Region
- Nové Hamry, a municipality and village in the Karlovy Vary Region
- Staré Hamry, a municipality and village in the Moravian-Silesian Region
- Velké Hamry, a town in the Liberec Region

== See also ==
- Hamr (disambiguation), similar name of several Czech locations
