= Skiing in Slovenia =

Skiing is very popular in Slovenia and has a tradition spanning over 300 years. There are a number of small skiing centres in Slovenia. The largest skiing centres are Krvavec, Cerkno, Rogla, Kanin, Kranjska Gora, Maribor Pohorje, and Vogel. The oldest description was published by Janez Vajkard Valvasor in 1689. It outlined the skiers of Bloke, which is a plateau in southwestern Slovenia. The Bloke skiers used long wooden planks to ski. The umbrella organisation for skiing in Slovenia is the Ski Association of Slovenia, the predecessor of which was established in 1922. In 1895, one of the first skiing competitions in Europe took place near Ajdovščina, and a skiing course was organised by Rudolf Badjura in Tivoli City Park in 1913 and 1914. The largest sports competition in Slovenia were the FIS Nordic World Ski Championships 2023, which were attended by 2000 sportspeople from 66 countries.
