= Hradec =

Hradec may refer to places:

== Czech Republic ==
- Hradec (Havlíčkův Brod District), a municipality and village in the Vysočina Region
- Hradec (Plzeň-South District), a municipality and village in the Plzeň Region
- Hradec, a village and part of Mnichovo Hradiště in the Central Bohemian Region
- Hradec, a village and part of Rokle in the Ústí nad Labem Region
  - Hradec substation, a large electrical substation near this village
- Hradec, a village and part of Stříbrná Skalice in the Central Bohemian Region
- Hradec Králové, a city
  - Hradec Králové Region
  - Hradec Králové District
- Hradec nad Moravicí, a town in the Moravian-Silesian Region
- Hradec-Nová Ves, a municipality and village in the Olomouc Region
- Jindřichův Hradec, a town in the South Bohemian Region
- Krty-Hradec, a municipality and village in the South Bohemian Region
- Levý Hradec, an early medieval gord near Prague

== Slovakia ==
- Hradec, a borough of Prievidza

== See also ==
- Hradce
- Gradec (disambiguation)
