= Grbin =

Grbin may refer to:

- Grbin, Slovenia, a former village near Litija
- Peđa Grbin, Croatian politician
- Miloje Grbin, Serbian sociologist and poet
