= Litija =

- Town
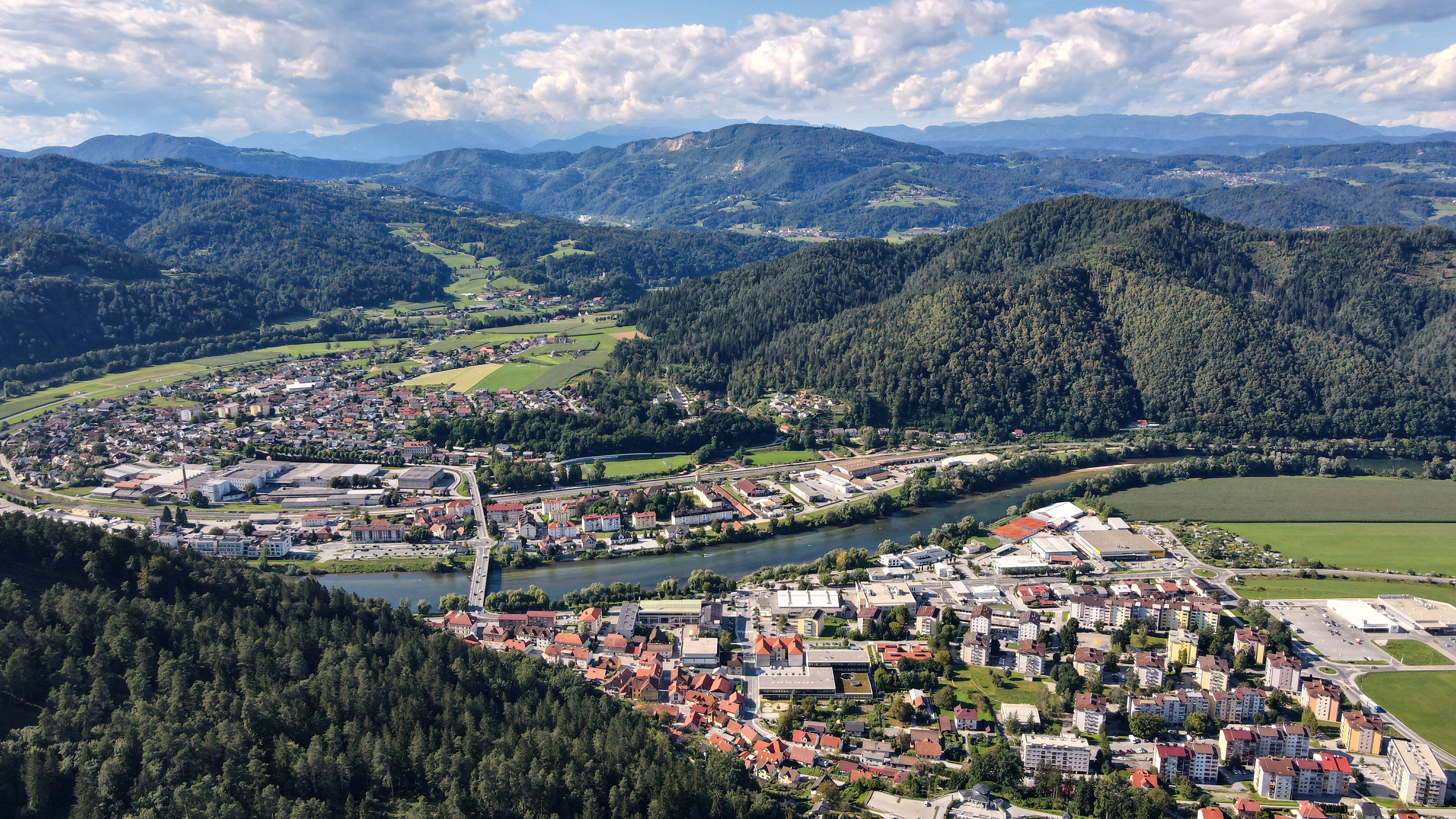
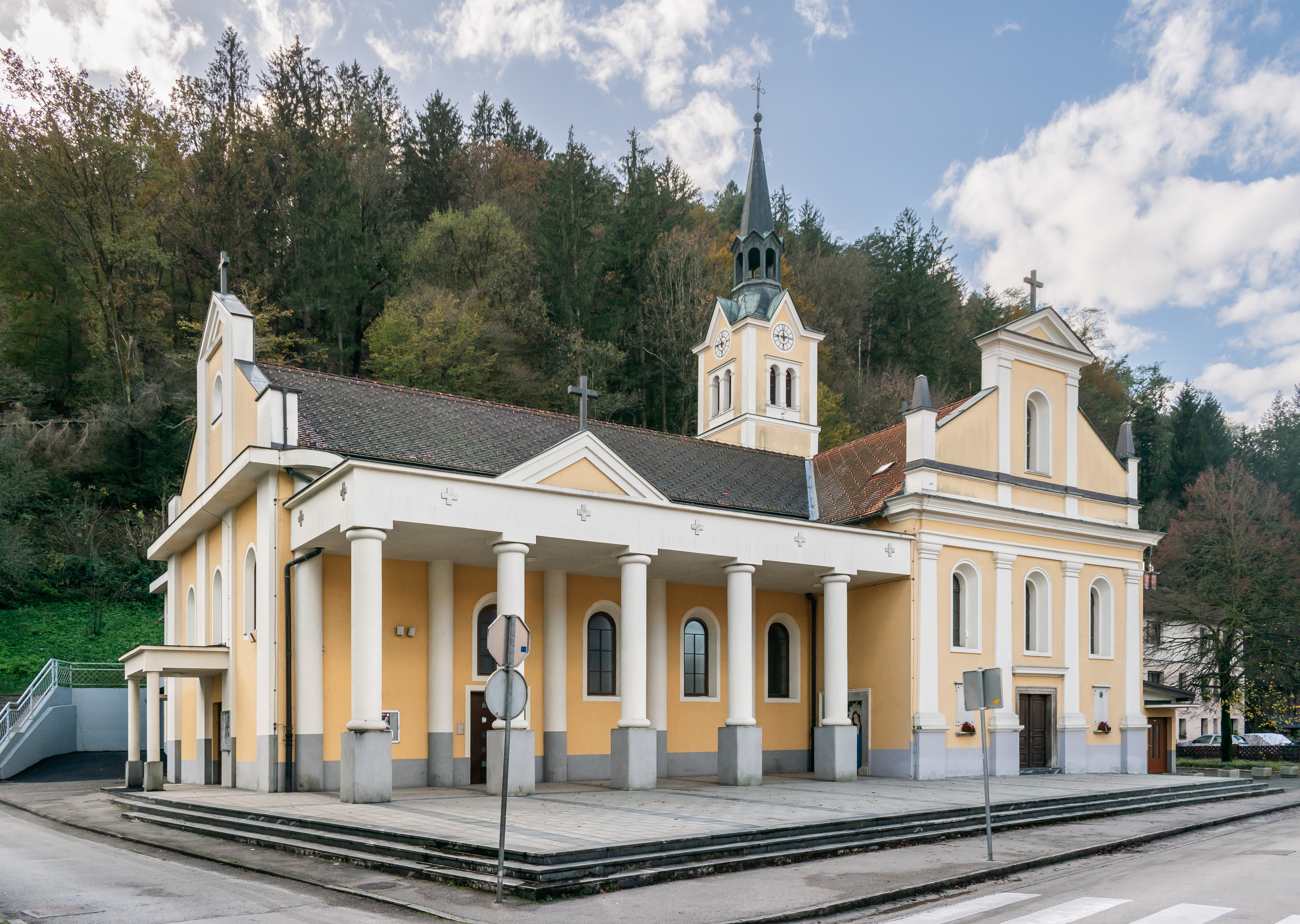
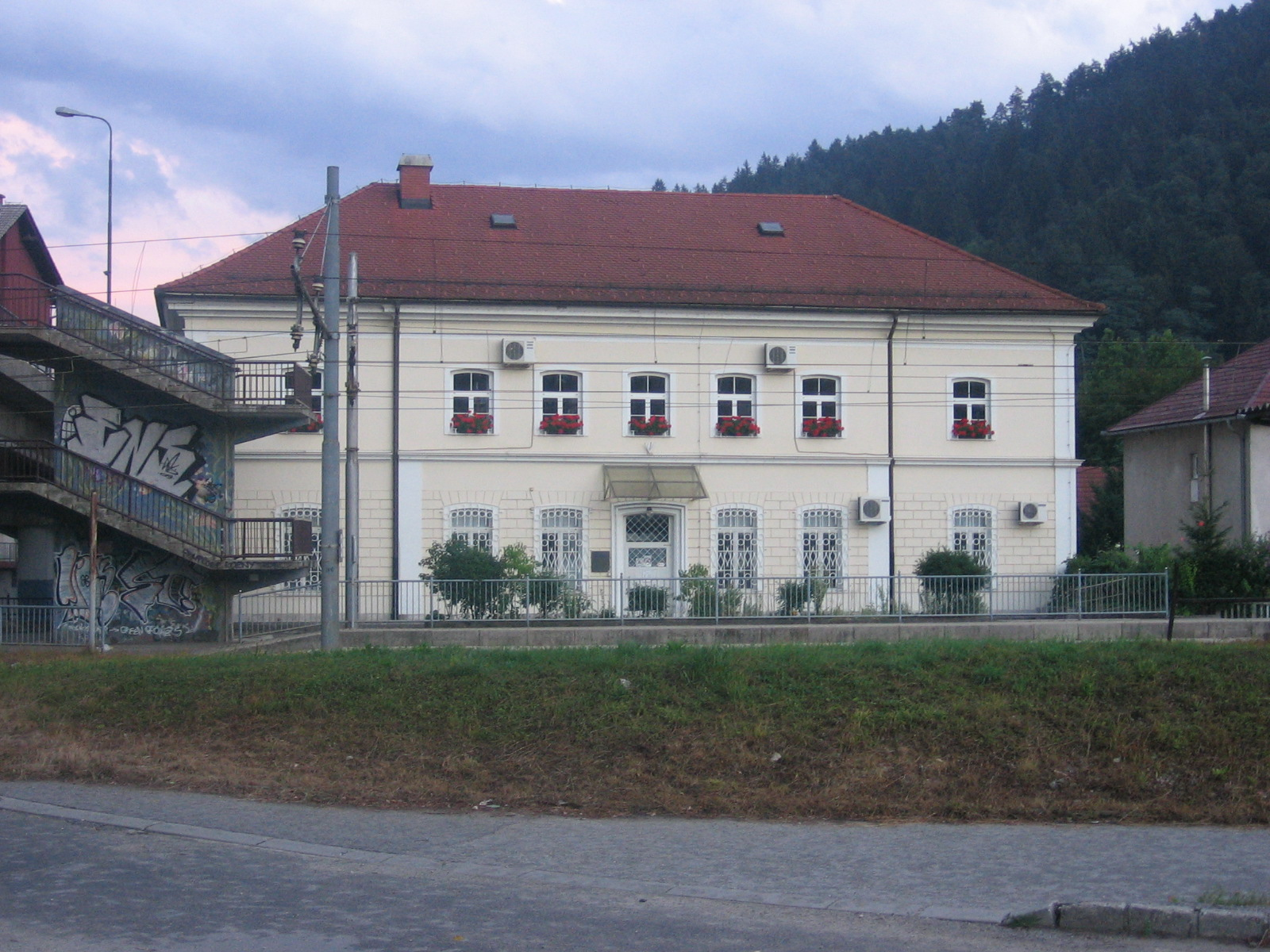
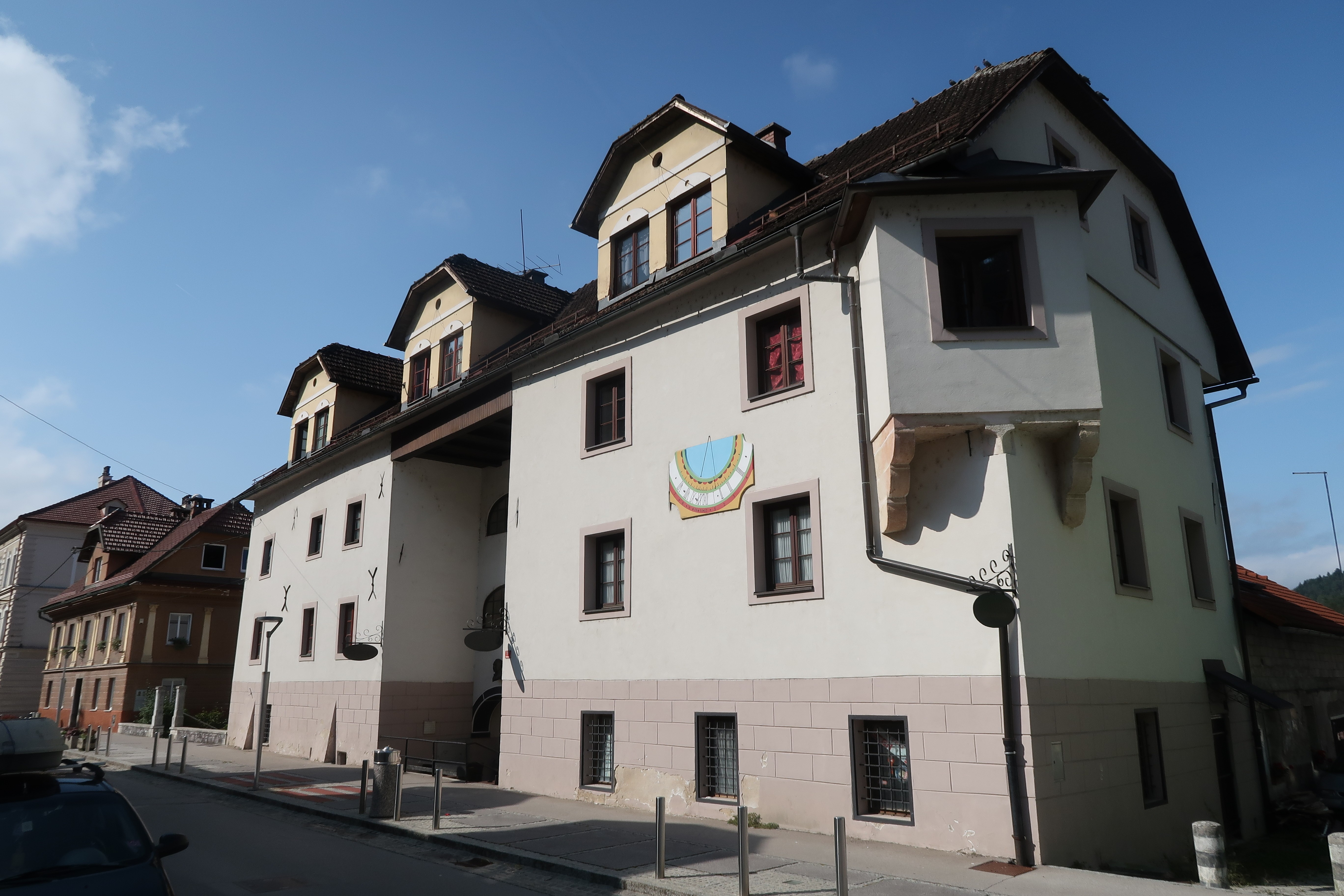
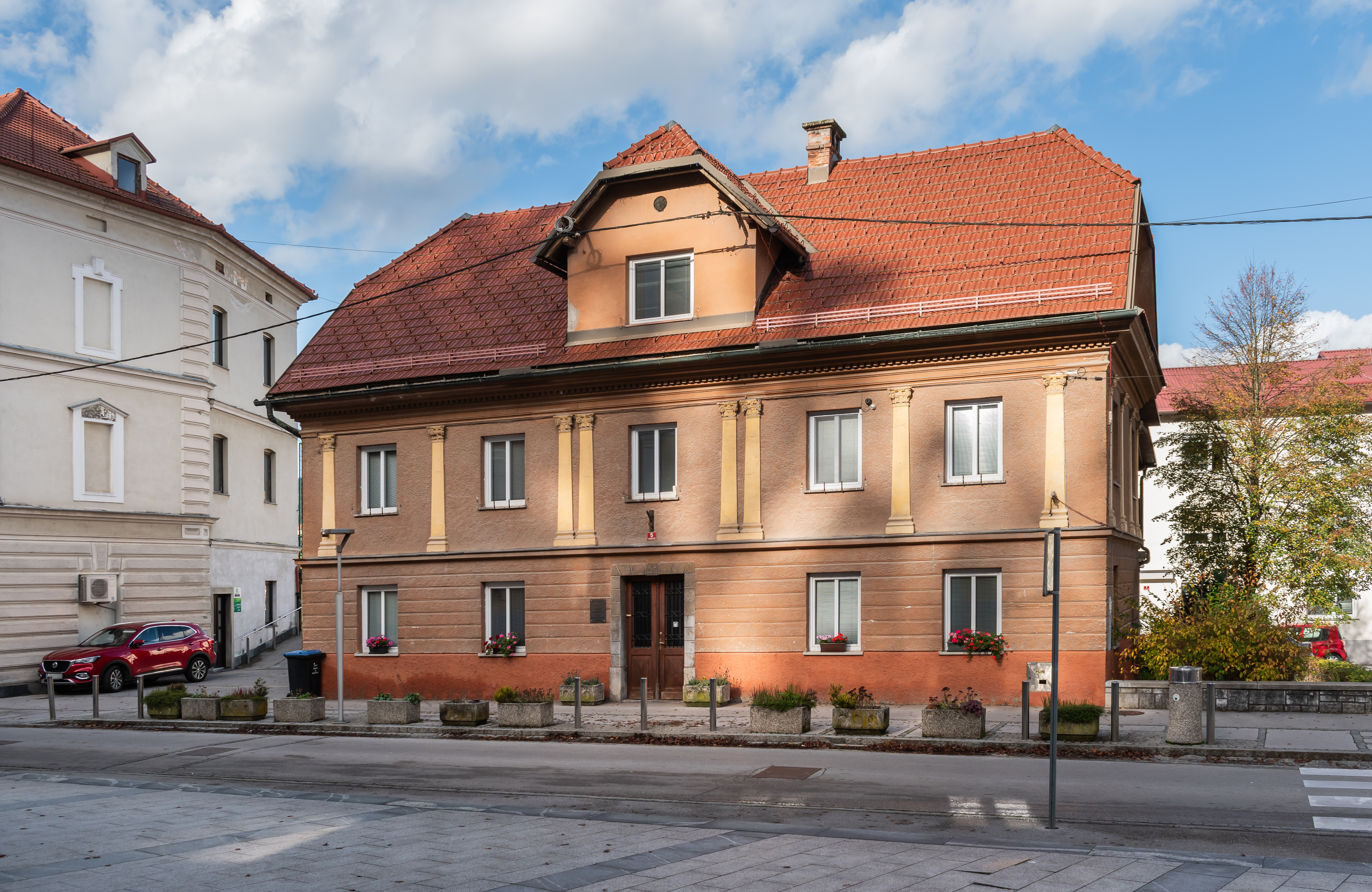
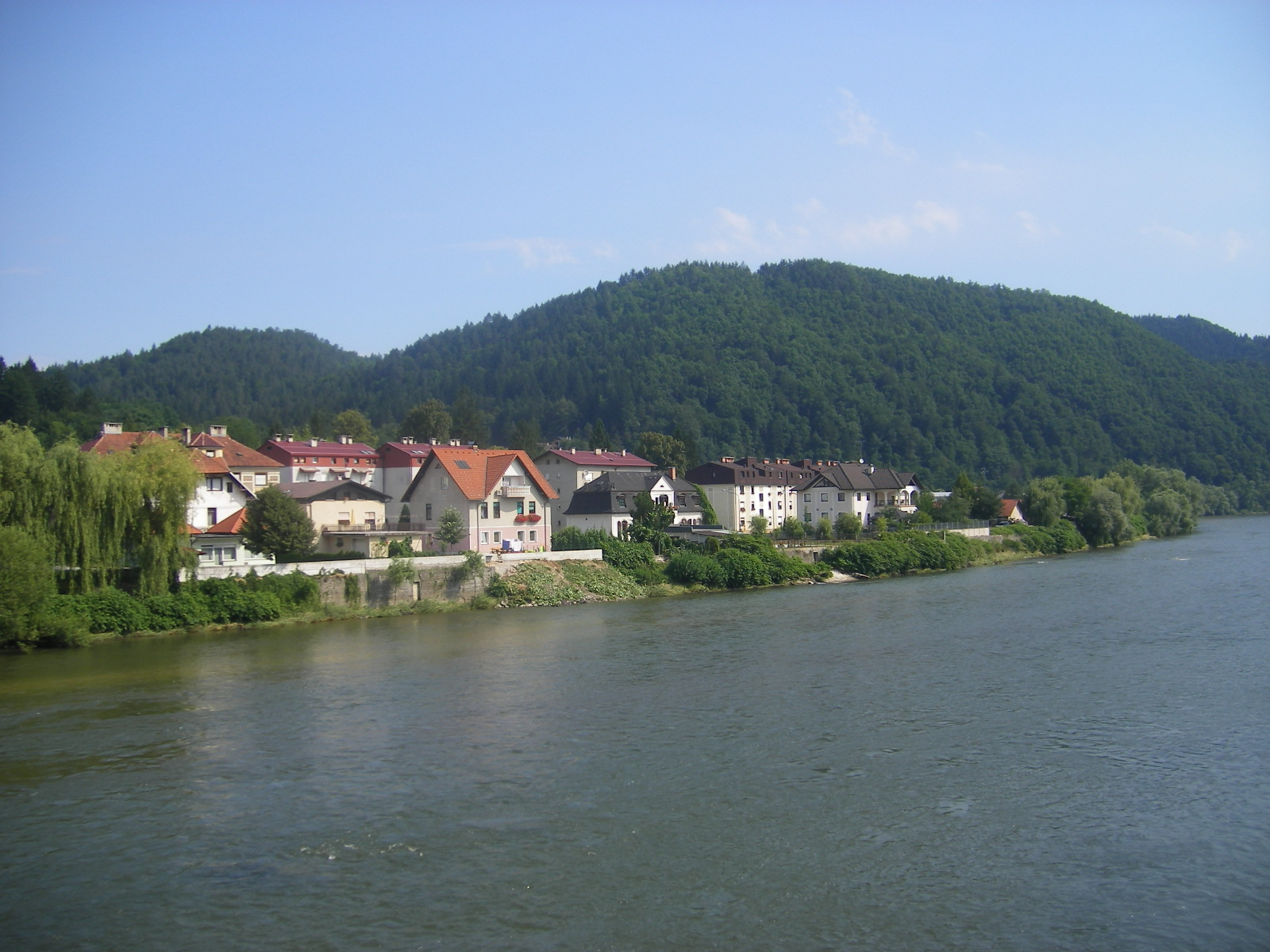
- From top, left to right: Overview of Litija, St. Nicholas' Church, Library, Turn Castle, Old town house, Litija Riverbank

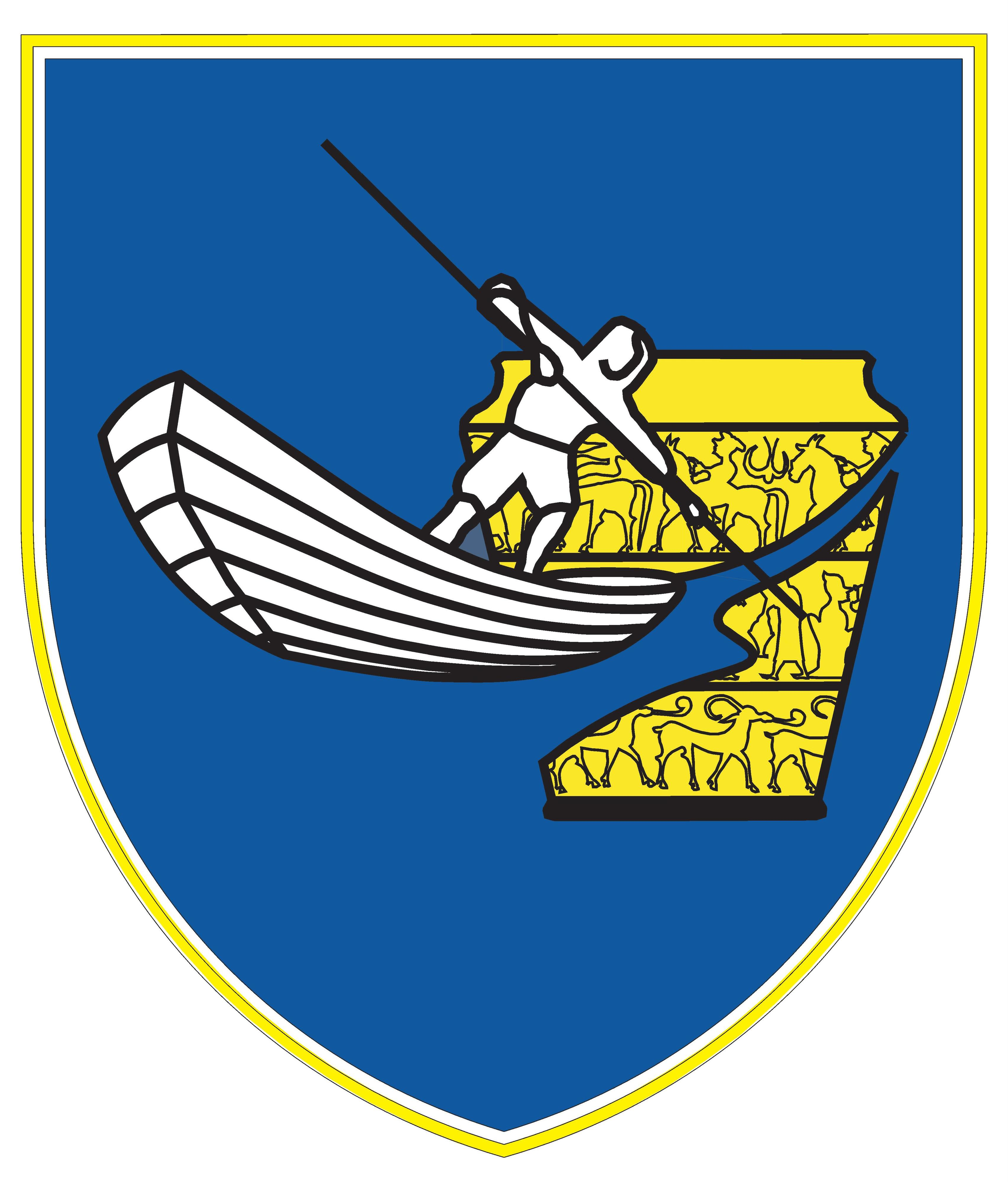
- Coat of arms

- Location of Litija in Slovenia
- Coordinates: 46°04′N 14°49′E
- Country: Slovenia
- Traditional region: Lower Carniola
- Statistical region: Central Sava
- Municipality: Litija

Government
  - Mayor: Franci Rokavec

Area
  - Total: 5.3 km^{2} (2.0 sq mi)

Population (2026)
  - Total: 6,732
  - Density: 1,275/km^{2} (3,300/sq mi)
- Time zone: UTC+01 (CET)
  - Summer (DST): UTC+02 (CEST)
- Vehicle registration: LJ

Litija (pronounced [liˈtíːja]; German: Littai) is a town in the Litija Basin in central Slovenia. It is the seat of the Municipality of Litija. It is located in the valley of the Sava River, east of the capital Ljubljana, on the border of Upper Carniola and Lower Carniola traditional regions. The entire municipality is now included in the Central Sava Statistical Region; until January 2014 it was part of the Central Slovenia Statistical Region. In January 2026, the population was 6,732.

== Name ==
Litija was mentioned in written documents in 1256 as apud Litigiam and apud Lvtyam (and as Lutya in 1363, Littai in 1431, Luttey in 1444, and propre Lutiam in 1480). Medieval attestations indicate that the name was originally *Ljutija, derived from *Ľutoviďa (vьsь) (literally, 'Ľutovidъ's village'). Suggestions that -ija is a suffix or that the name is derived from German Lutte '(mining) drain' are less likely. Other pseudoetymologies include Johann Weikhard von Valvasor's suggestion that the name evolved from litus, the Latin word for 'riverbank'. The town was officially known as Littai in German until 1918.

== History ==
Litija developed as a trading post between Trieste, Ljubljana, and Croatia. The town gained market rights in the 14th century. In Roman times mining developed in Litija and remained one of the primary sources of income until the 1965, when the biggest of the mines closed. In 1849 the Austrian Southern Railway reached Litija and boosted its economy. This development, however, also meant a decline in some of the traditional local professions. The Litija post office was opened in December 1852. After the Second World War, Litija annexed the formerly independent settlements of Podsitarjevec, Gradec, Grbin, and Podkraj.

== Landmarks ==
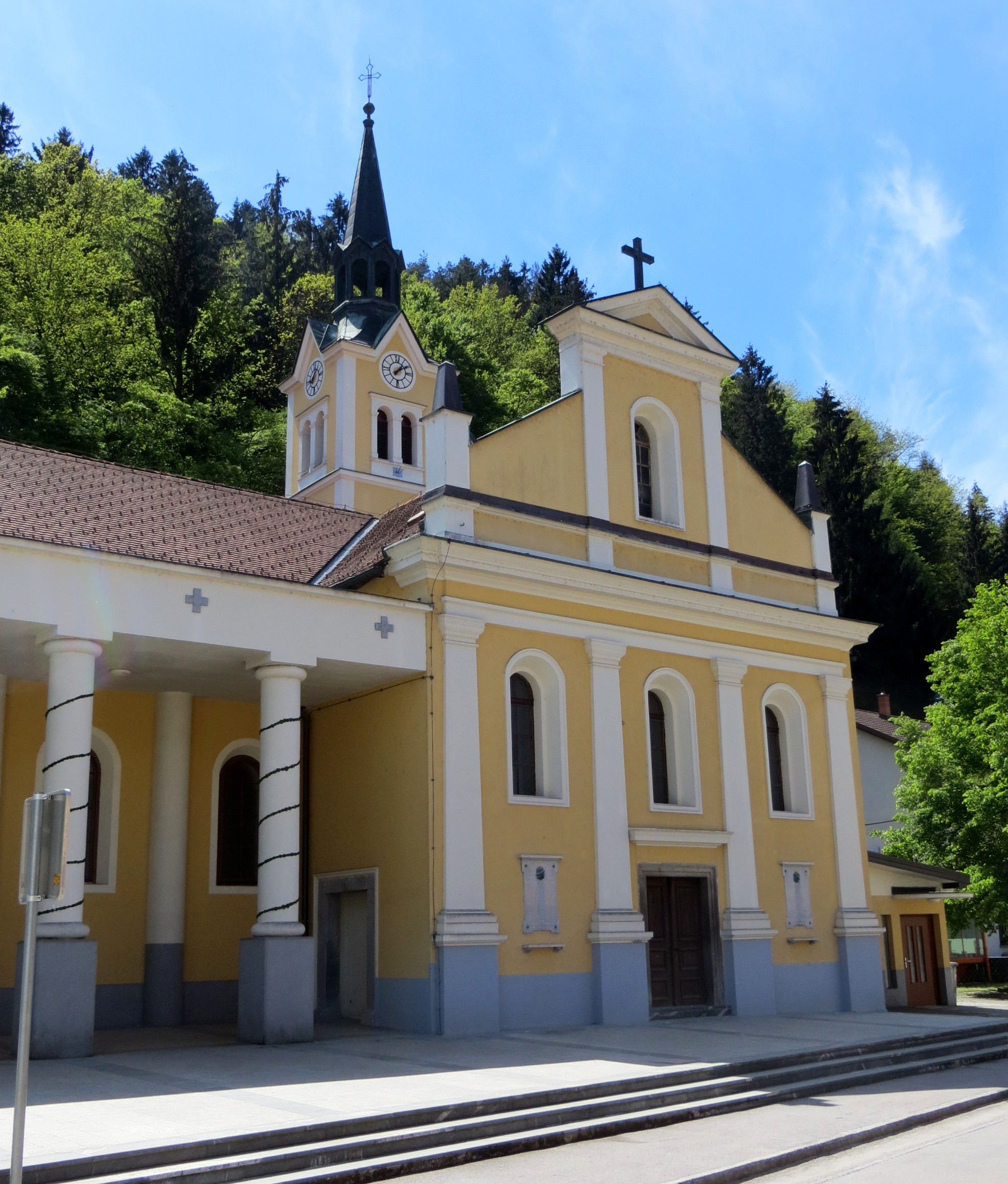
St. Nicholas's Church

The parish church in the settlement is dedicated to Saint Nicholas and belongs to the Roman Catholic Archdiocese of Ljubljana. The current building was built in 1884 and extended in 1997.

== Notable people ==
Notable people that were born or lived in Litija include:

- France Bezlaj (1910–1993), linguist
- Luka Svetec (1826–1921), politician
- Peter Jereb (1867–1951), composer
- Viktor Parma (1858–1924), composer
- Rudolf Badjura (1881–1963), writer and mountaineer
- Mira Pregelj (1905–1966), painter
- Milan Borišek (1920–1950), glider pilot
  Historical population
  Year	Pop.	±%
  1948	2,639	—
  1953	2,762	+4.7%
  1961	3,474	+25.8%
  1971	4,169	+20.0%
  1981	5,900	+41.5%
  1991	6,592	+11.7%
  2002	6,420	−2.6%
  2011	6,467	+0.7%
  2021	6,767	+4.6%
  Population size may be affected by changes in administrative divisions.

== Gallery ==
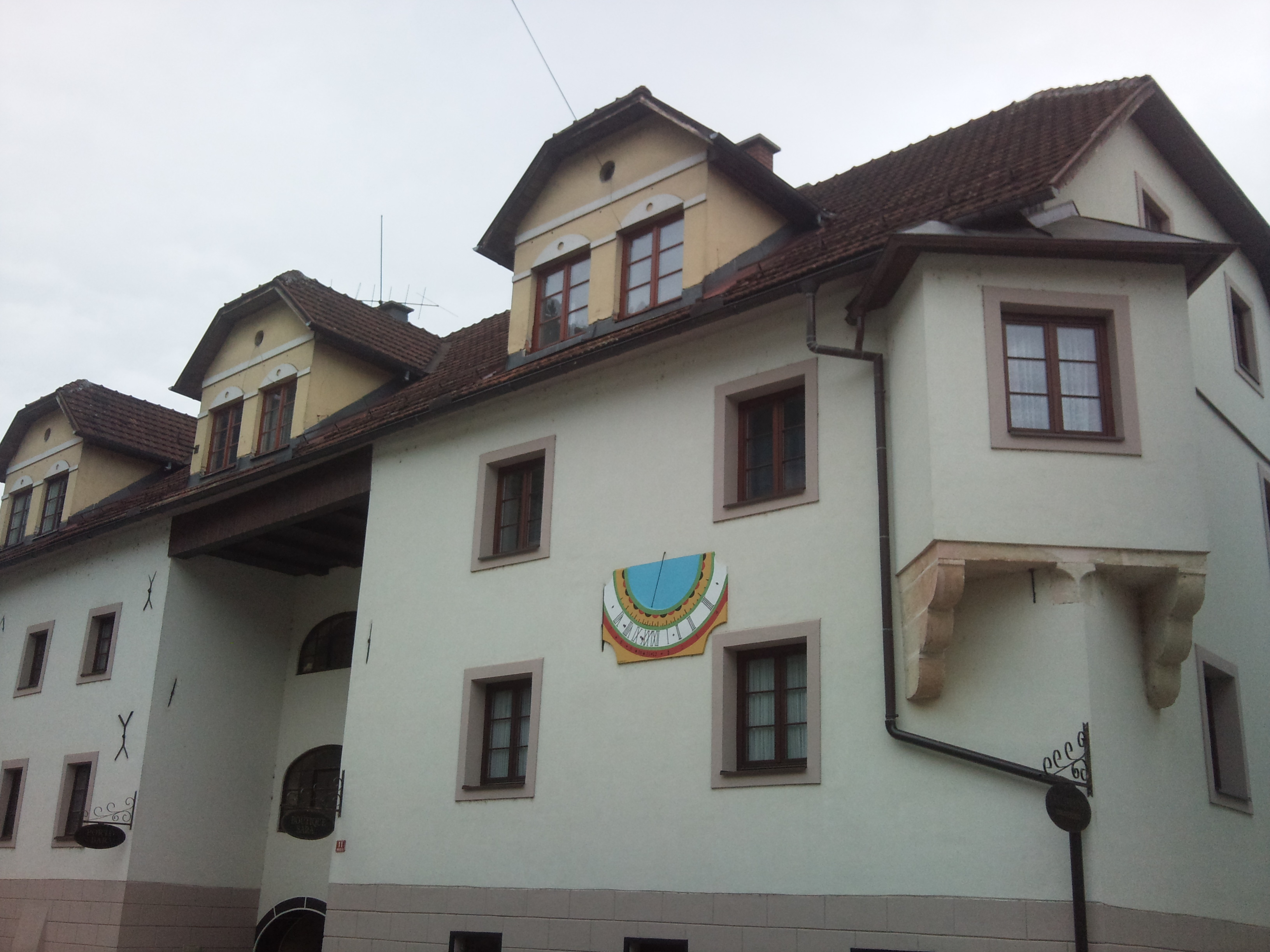
Turn Castle

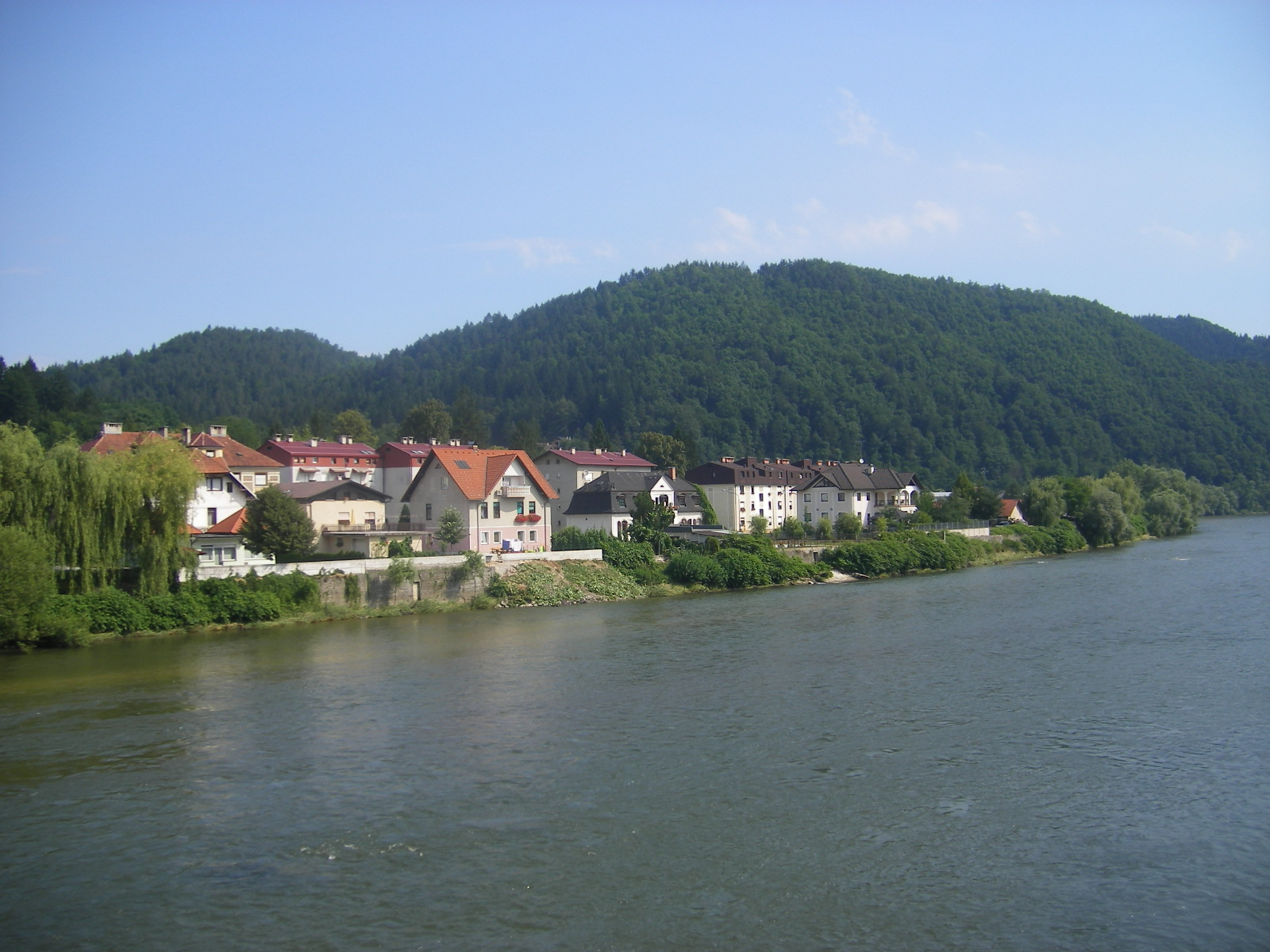
Litija lies on both banks of the Sava River

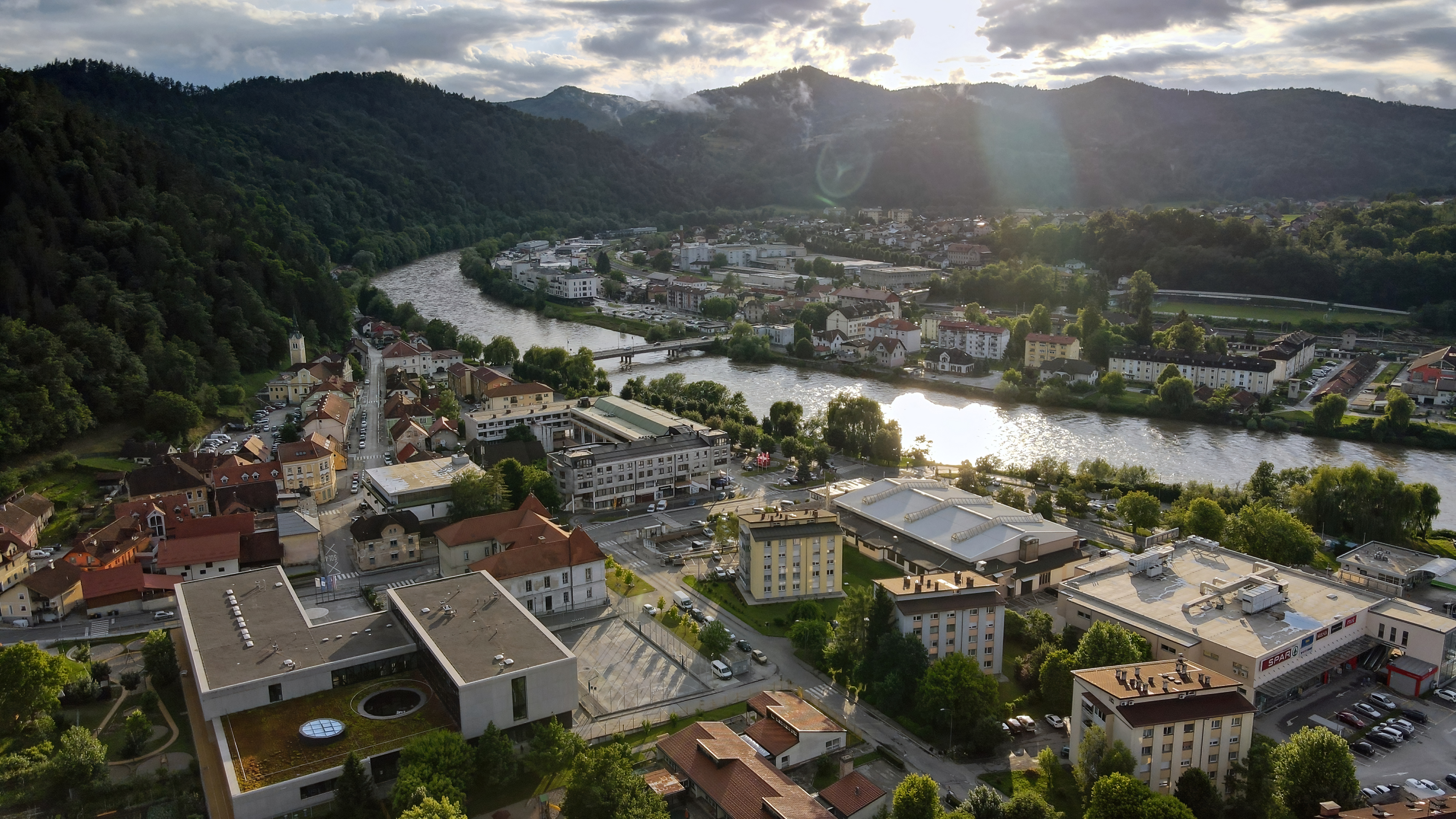
Downtown Litija in 2021
