= Ski Association of Slovenia =

Logo.

The Ski Association of Slovenia (Slovene: Smučarska zveza Slovenije; SZS), also known by its brand name SLOSKI, is the main organization devoted to skiing sports in Slovenia. Headquartered in Ljubljana, it represents Slovenia in the International Ski and Snowboard Federation (FIS), and is a member of the Olympic Committee of Slovenia.

Founded in 1948, it covers the skiing disciplines of alpine, cross-country, Nordic combined, ski jumping, and snowboarding.

The current president is Luka Steiner who in October 2025 succeeded Enzo Smrekar.

== List of presidents ==
#	Name	Years
1.	Danilo Dougan	1948−1963
2.	Niko Belopavlovič	1963−1974
3.	Janez Kocijančič	1974−1984
4.	Janez Zajc	1984−1992
5.	Stane Valant	1992−2010
6.	Tomaž Lovše	2010−2012
7.	Primož Ulaga	2012−2013
8.	Enzo Smrekar	2013−2025
9.	Luka Steiner	2025–

== See also ==
- Skiing in Slovenia
