= Podsitarjevec =

- Location in Slovenia
- Coordinates: 46°2′58″N 14°49′57″E
- Country: Slovenia
- Traditional region: Lower Carniola
- Statistical region: Central Sava
- Municipality: Litija
- Elevation: 275 m (902 ft)

Podsitarjevec (Slovene pronunciation: [pɔdˈsiːtaɾjɛʋəts]) is a former settlement in the Municipality of Litija in central Slovenia. It is now part of the town of Litija. The area is part of the traditional region of Lower Carniola and is now included with the rest of the municipality in the Central Sava Statistical Region.

== Geography ==
Podsitarjevec stands in the southern part of Litija, below the southeastern slope of Sitarjevec Hill (elevation: 448 meters or 1,470 feet).

== History ==
A hillfort on top of Sitarjevec Hill dates from the late Iron Age and was found in 1994. The hillfort was populated until Roman times.

The modern settlement of Podsitarjevec is relatively young; it was initially populated by factory and mine workers associated with the lead mine at Sitarjevec Hill. Podsitarjevec had a population of 23 living in eight houses in 1931. Podsitarjevec was annexed by Litija in 1955, ending its existence as a separate settlement.
