= Gradec, Litija =

Gradec
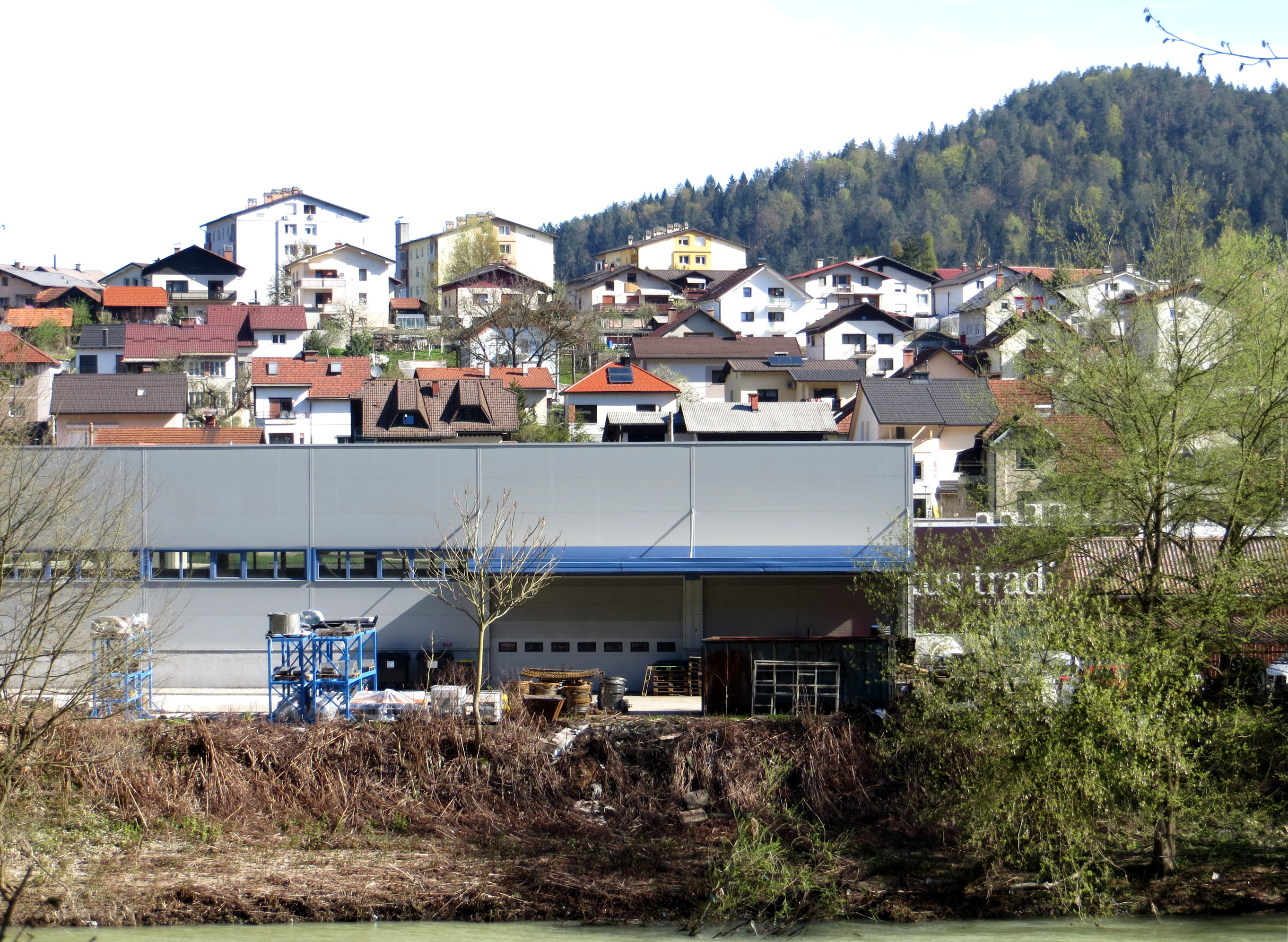

- Location in Slovenia
- Coordinates: 46°3′38″N 14°49′15″E
- Country: Slovenia
- Traditional region: Upper Carniola
- Statistical region: Central Sava
- Municipality: Litija
- Elevation: 250 m (820 ft)

Gradec (pronounced [ˈɡɾaːdəts]; German: Grazdorf) is a former settlement in the Municipality of Litija in central Slovenia. It is now part of the town of Litija. The area is part of the traditional region of Upper Carniola and is now included with the rest of the municipality in the Central Sava Statistical Region.

== Geography ==
Gradec lies on the left bank of the Sava River, opposite the historic center of Litija. It is a dispersed settlement on a high terrace located in a meander of the river.

== Name ==
The name Gradec means 'little castle'. It was named after Ribče Castle (German: Fischern), which was a fishing station owned by the Auersperg family. Gradec is a relatively common settlement name (or part of such a name) in Slovenia (e.g., Gradec, Slovenj Gradec, Polhov Gradec) and beyond—for example, Gradec in Croatia and Graz (Slovene: Gradec) in Austria.

== History ==
Gradec started developing as a settlement after 1849, when the railroad was built. In 1885 a cotton mill with 3,250 spools was established by Julius Schwarz and Eugen Zublin. After this, other workshops were built, and during the interwar period large residential units were built, creating the neighborhood known as Na stavbah (literally, 'by the buildings'). Gradec was annexed by Litija in 1955, ending its existence as a separate settlement.

== Ribče Castle ==
Ribče Castle (German: Fischern) stood above the railway station in the settlement. The castle was built at the end of the 16th century. Its many owners included Johann Balthasar von Burgstall from Krupa, and members of the Wutalitsch, von Scharffeneck, Graffenweger, von Coppini, Moshacher, Ursini von Blagay, von Wolkensberg, and Auersperg families.

== Notable people ==
Notable people that were born or lived in Gradec include:

- Janko Vrančič (1889–1959), technical writer and lawyer

== Gallery ==
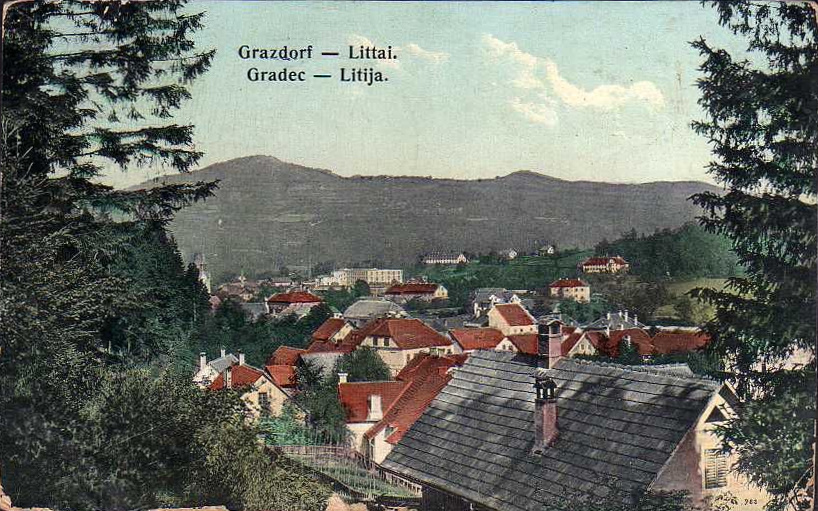
Historical postcard of Gradec
