= Majdalena =

- Municipality
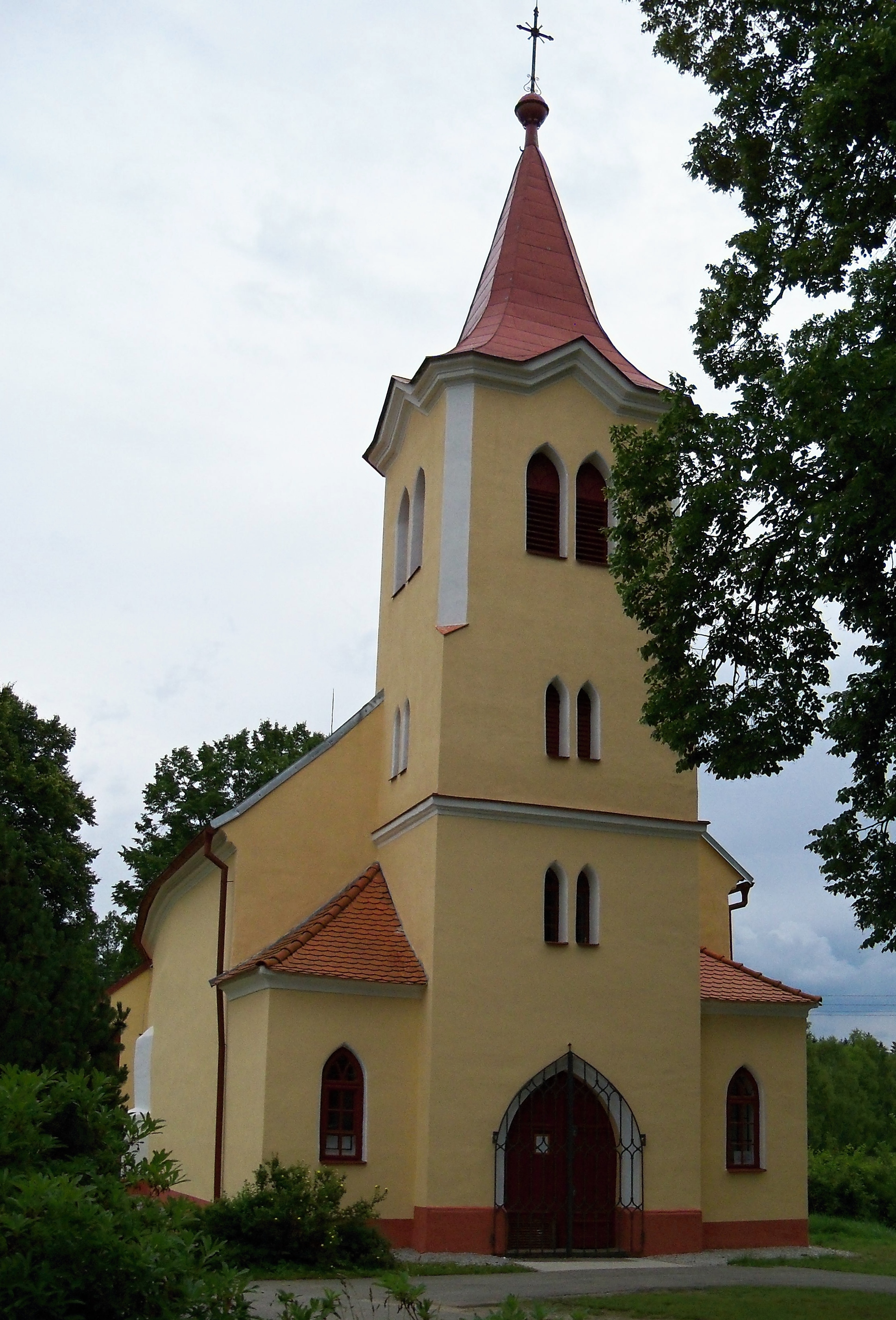
- Church of Saint Mary Magdalene

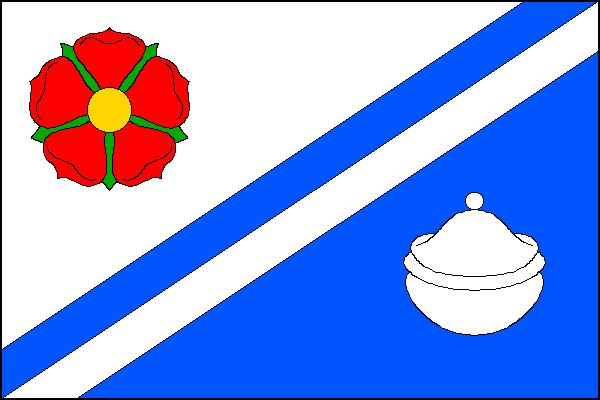
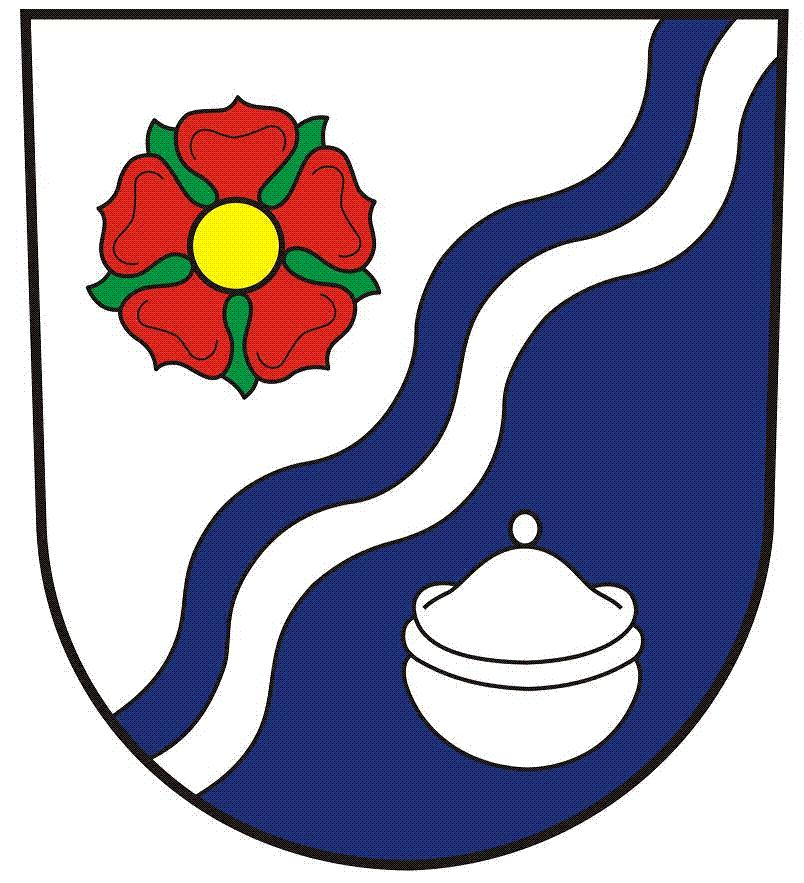
- Flag Coat of arms

- Location in the Czech Republic
- Coordinates: 48°57′39″N 14°51′41″E
- Country: Czech Republic
- Region: South Bohemian
- District: Jindřichův Hradec
- First mentioned: 1397

Area
  - Total: 12.96 km^{2} (5.00 sq mi)
- Elevation: 438 m (1,437 ft)

Population (2026-01-01)
  - Total: 486
  - Density: 37.5/km^{2} (97.1/sq mi)
- Time zone: UTC+1 (CET)
  - Summer (DST): UTC+2 (CEST)
- Postal code: 378 03
- Website: majdalena.cz

Majdalena is a municipality and village in Jindřichův Hradec District in the South Bohemian Region of the Czech Republic. It has about 500 inhabitants.

Majdalena lies approximately 24 kilometres (15 mi) south-west of Jindřichův Hradec, 28 km (17 mi) east of České Budějovice, and 129 km (80 mi) south of Prague.

== Demographics ==
Historical population
| Year | Pop. | ±% |
|---|---|---|
| 1869 | 472 | — |
| 1880 | 542 | +14.8% |
| 1890 | 586 | +8.1% |
| 1900 | 655 | +11.8% |
| 1910 | 767 | +17.1% |
| 1921 | 643 | −16.2% |
| 1930 | 641 | −0.3% |
| 1950 | 487 | −24.0% |
| 1961 | 501 | +2.9% |
| 1970 | 507 | +1.2% |
| 1980 | 583 | +15.0% |
| 1991 | 547 | −6.2% |
| 2001 | 501 | −8.4% |
| 2011 | 473 | −5.6% |
| 2021 | 482 | +1.9% |
Source: Censuses

== Notable people ==
- Jiří Havlis (1932–2010), rower, Olympic champion
