= Hamr na Jezeře =

- Municipality
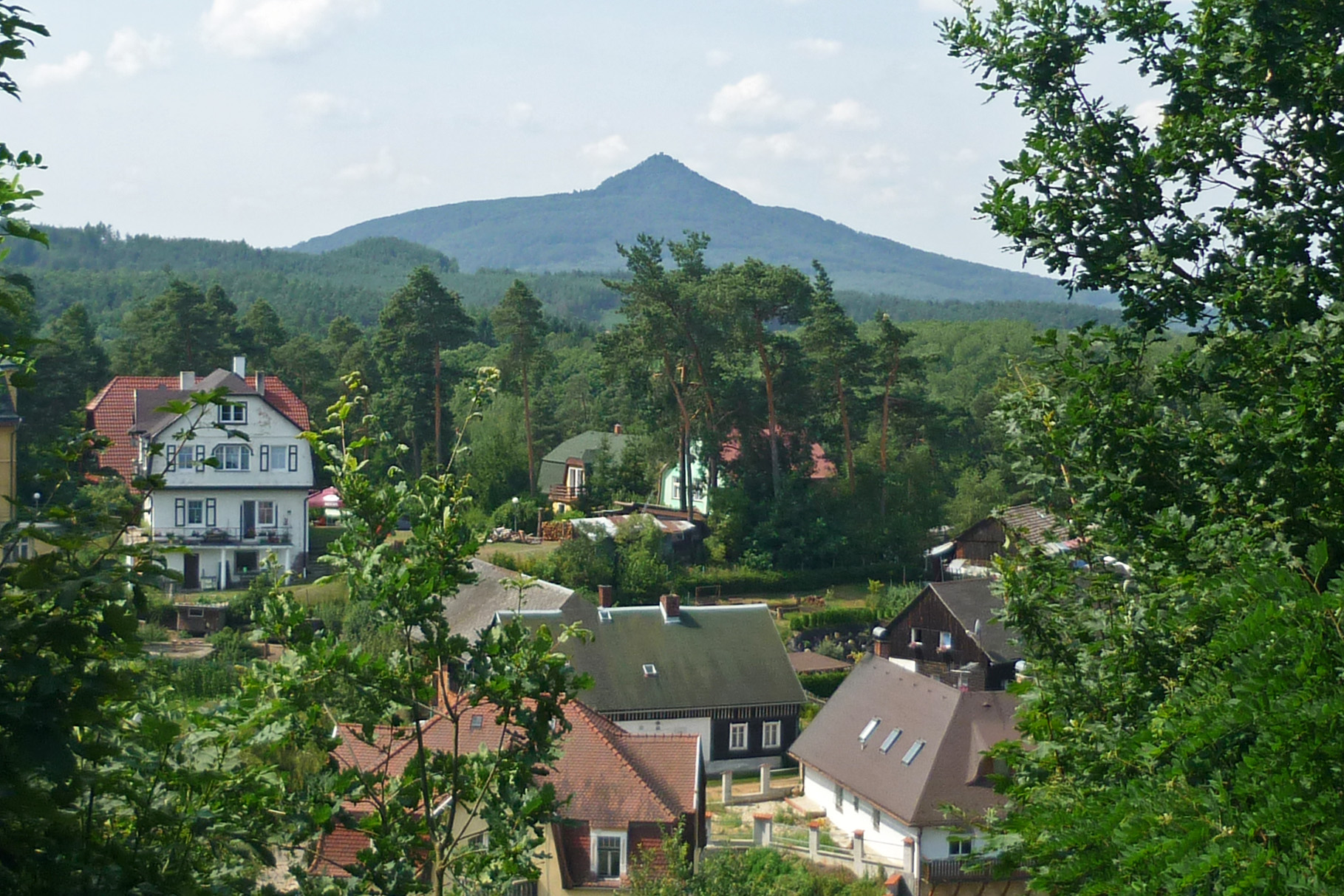
- Centre of Hamr na Jezeře

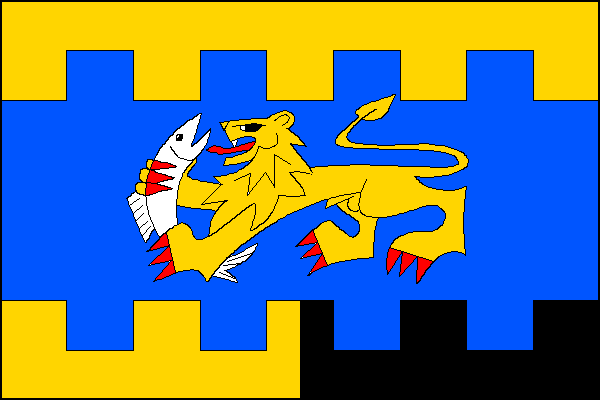
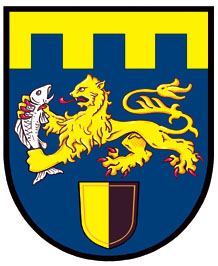
- Flag Coat of arms

- Location in the Czech Republic
- Coordinates: 50°42′11″N 14°50′18″E
- Country: Czech Republic
- Region: Liberec
- District: Česká Lípa
- First mentioned: 1544

Area
  - Total: 17.68 km^{2} (6.83 sq mi)
- Elevation: 320 m (1,050 ft)

Population (2026-01-01)
  - Total: 473
  - Density: 26.8/km^{2} (69.3/sq mi)
- Time zone: UTC+1 (CET)
  - Summer (DST): UTC+2 (CEST)
- Postal code: 471 28
- Website: obechamr.cz

Hamr na Jezeře (German: Hammer am See) is a municipality and village in Česká Lípa District in the Liberec Region of the Czech Republic. It has about 500 inhabitants. It is known as a recreation centre.

== Administrative division ==
Hamr na Jezeře consists of three municipal parts (in brackets population according to the 2021 census):

- Hamr na Jezeře (169)
- Břevniště (220)
- Útěchovice (41)

== Etymology ==
The name Hamr na Jezeře literally means 'hammer mill on Lake' in Czech.

== Geography ==
Hamr na Jezeře is located about 15 kilometres (9 mi) west of Liberec. It lies in the Ralsko Uplands. The highest point is the hill Útěchovický Špičák at 500 m (1,640 ft) above sea level. The Ploučnice River and its arm Hamerská strouha flow through the municipality. The village of Hamr na Jezeře lies on the shores of the fishpond Hamerské jezero. This fishpond with an area of 56 ha (140 acres) was established in the 16th century and today is used for recreational purposes and fish farming.

== History ==
The first written mention of Útěchovice, which is the oldest part of the municipality, is from 1322. Hamr na Jezeře was first mentioned in 1544. In the 16th century, a mill on the Ploučnice and several hammer mills were built in the village to process iron ore mined in the nearby area. At the end of the 19th century, Hamr na Jezeře became a spa village and a tourist destination. This era ended in the mid-20th century, when uranium was mined here for a decade. Since 1993, the village has been again a tourist destination.

== Demographics ==
Historical population

Year	Pop.	±%
1869	833	—
1880	767	−7.9%
1890	693	−9.6%
1900	628	−9.4%
1910	615	−2.1%

Year	Pop.	±%
1921	576	−6.3%
1930	624	+8.3%
1950	403	−35.4%
1961	408	+1.2%
1970	397	−2.7%

Year	Pop.	±%
1980	341	−14.1%
1991	247	−27.6%
2001	339	+37.2%
2011	394	+16.2%
2021	430	+9.1%

Source: Censuses

== Economy ==
Hamr na Jezeře is known as a recreation centre. On the shores of the pond there are two campsites and a swimming pool with complete infrastructure and attractions for tourists. The municipality is sometimes nicknamed "Riviera of the North".

== Transport ==
There are no railways or major roads passing through the municipality.

== Sights ==
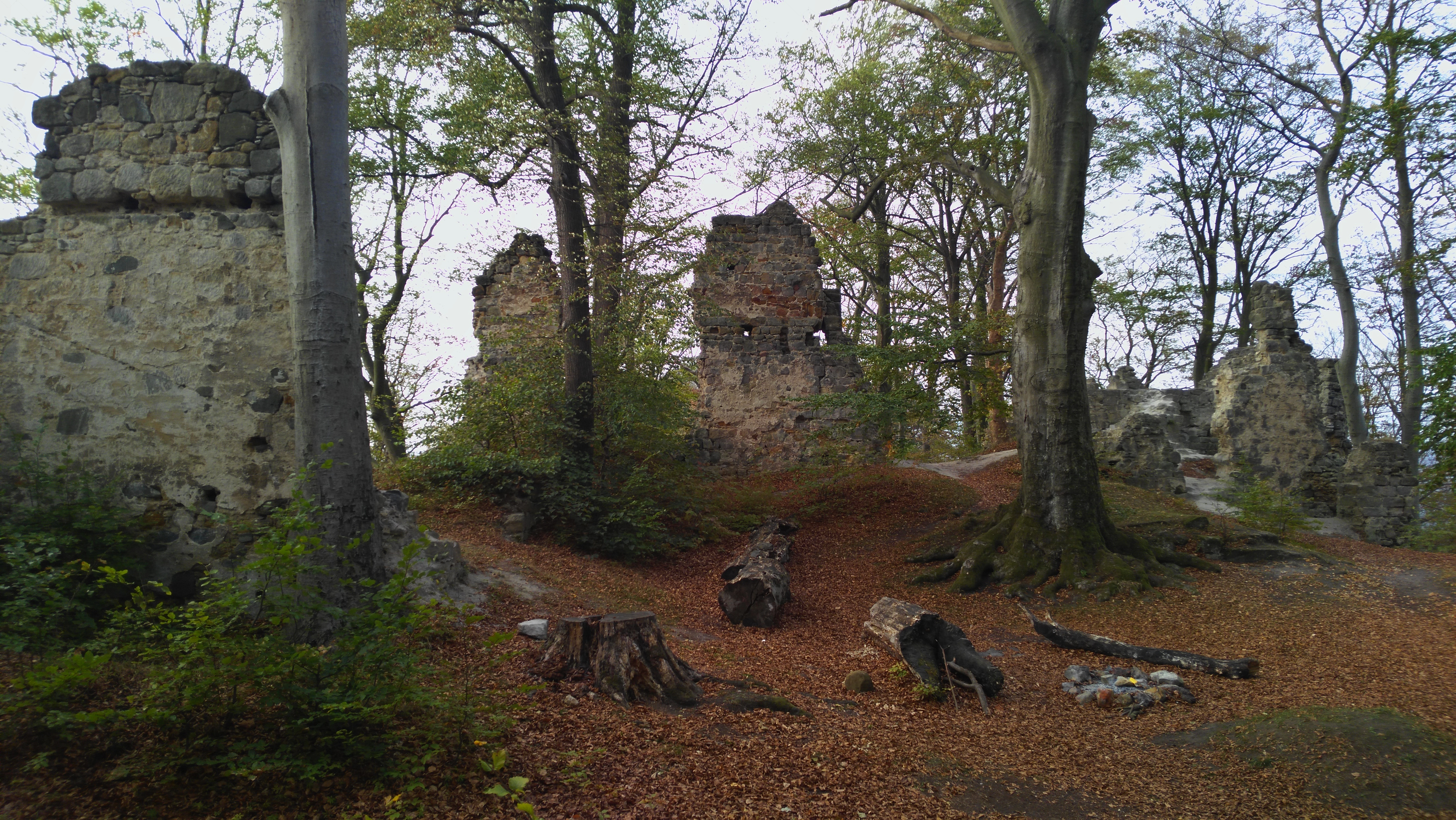
Ruin of Děvín Castle

On the Děvín hill, there is a ruin of an eponymous castle. It was a massive royal castle, built in 1250. In the 17th century, it was abandoned, and it was most likely destroyed during the Thirty Years' War.

On the Křížový vrch hill, there is a neo-Gothic Chapel of Our Lady Help of Christians from 1830.

== In popular culture ==
Within Czechoslovakia, Hamr na Jezeře was popularised thanks to the successful 1952 film Dovolená s Andělem.
