= Grbin, Slovenia =

Grbin
- Location in Slovenia
- Coordinates: 46°3′29″N 14°50′41″E
- Country: Slovenia
- Traditional region: Lower Carniola
- Statistical region: Central Sava
- Municipality: Litija
- Elevation: 265 m (869 ft)

Grbin (Slovene pronunciation: [ɡəɾˈbiːn], German: Gerbin) is a former settlement in the Municipality of Litija in central Slovenia. It is now part of the town of Litija. The area is part of the traditional region of Lower Carniola and is now included with the rest of the municipality in the Central Sava Statistical Region.

== Geography ==
Grbin stands in the southeastern part of Litija, atop the end of a hill above the right bank of the Sava River.

== History ==
Grbin had a population of 29 living in five houses in 1880, and 52 living in 12 houses in 1900. Grbin was annexed by Litija in 1955, ending its existence as a separate settlement.
