= Val (Tábor District) =

- Municipality
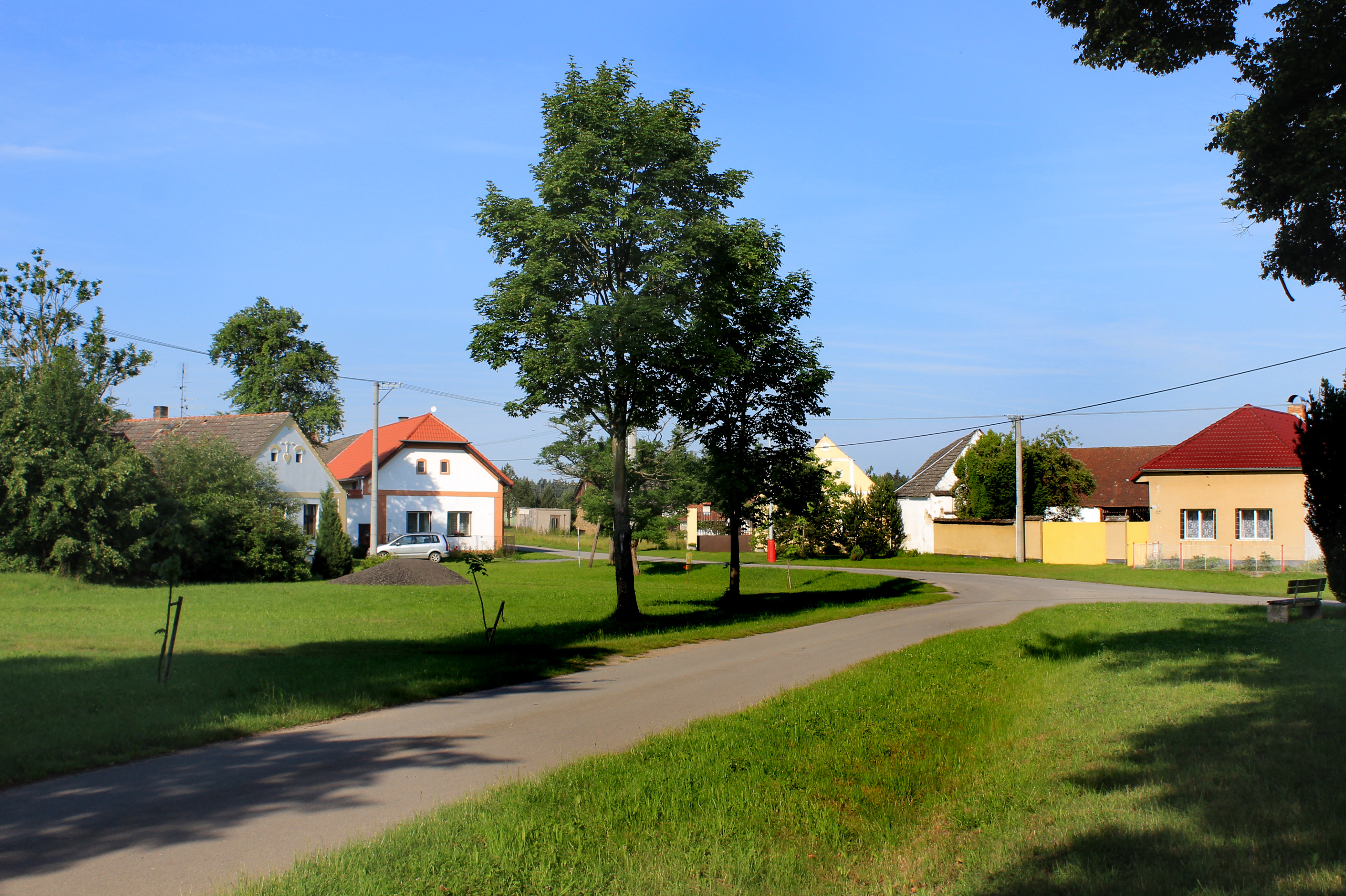
- Centre of Val

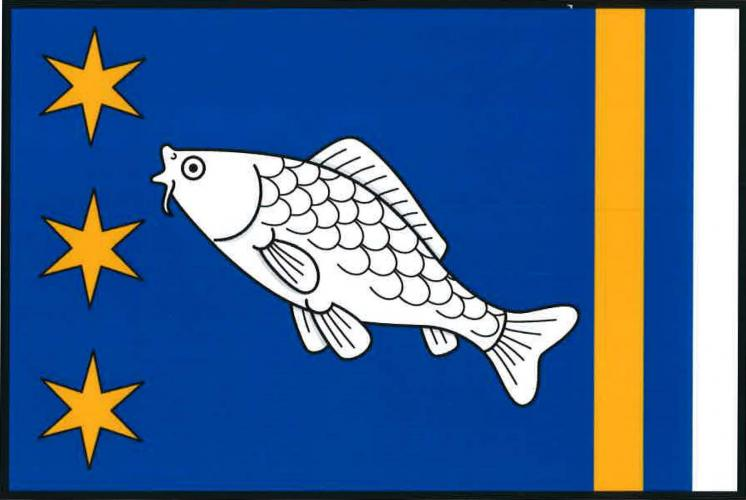
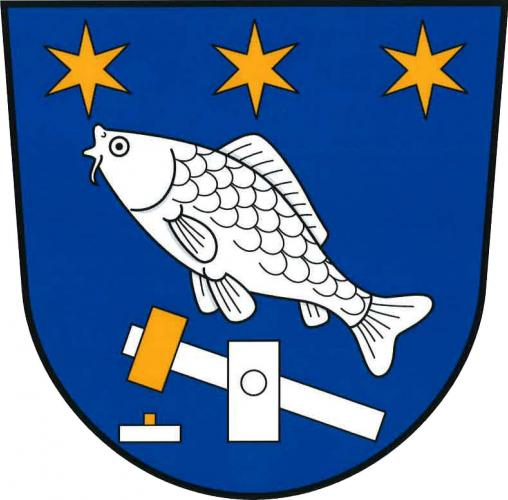
- Flag Coat of arms

- Location in the Czech Republic
- Coordinates: 49°8′46″N 14°45′22″E
- Country: Czech Republic
- Region: South Bohemian
- District: Tábor
- First mentioned: 1413

Area
  - Total: 16.35 km^{2} (6.31 sq mi)
- Elevation: 423 m (1,388 ft)

Population (2026-01-01)
  - Total: 253
  - Density: 15.5/km^{2} (40.1/sq mi)
- Time zone: UTC+1 (CET)
  - Summer (DST): UTC+2 (CEST)
- Postal code: 391 81
- Website: www.obecval.cz

Val is a municipality and village in Tábor District in the South Bohemian Region of the Czech Republic. It has about 300 inhabitants.

Val lies approximately 33 kilometres (21 mi) south of Tábor, 28 km (17 mi) north-east of České Budějovice, and 109 km (68 mi) south of Prague.

== Administrative division ==
Val consists of two municipal parts (in brackets population according to the 2021 census):

- Val (169)
- Hamr (78)

== Demographics ==
Historical population
| Year | Pop. | ±% |
|---|---|---|
| 1869 | 582 | — |
| 1880 | 561 | −3.6% |
| 1890 | 587 | +4.6% |
| 1900 | 564 | −3.9% |
| 1910 | 622 | +10.3% |
| 1921 | 587 | −5.6% |
| 1930 | 584 | −0.5% |
| 1950 | 418 | −28.4% |
| 1961 | 421 | +0.7% |
| 1970 | 344 | −18.3% |
| 1980 | 275 | −20.1% |
| 1991 | 224 | −18.5% |
| 2001 | 241 | +7.6% |
| 2011 | 242 | +0.4% |
| 2021 | 247 | +2.1% |
Source: Censuses
