= Staňkov (Jindřichův Hradec District) =

- Municipality
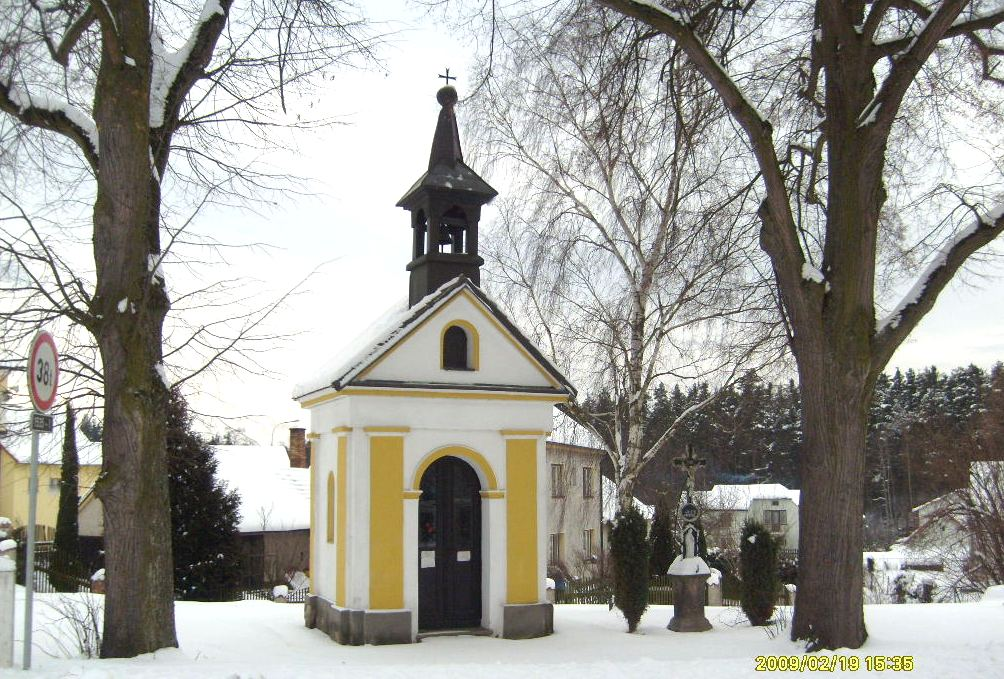
- Chapel in Staňkov

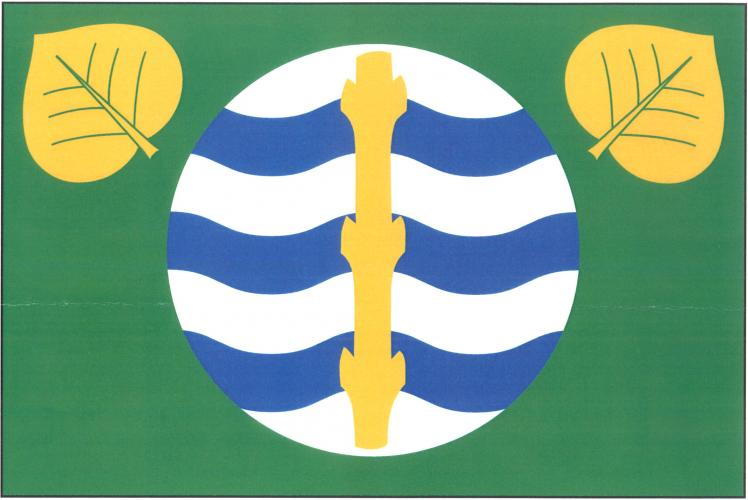
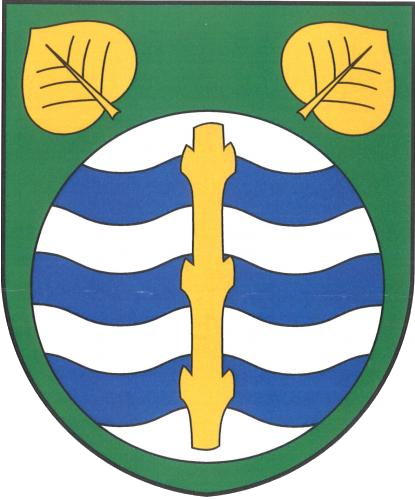
- Flag Coat of arms

- Location in the Czech Republic
- Coordinates: 48°58′47″N 14°57′10″E
- Country: Czech Republic
- Region: South Bohemian
- District: Jindřichův Hradec
- First mentioned: 1654

Area
  - Total: 18.93 km^{2} (7.31 sq mi)
- Elevation: 470 m (1,540 ft)

Population (2026-01-01)
  - Total: 206
  - Density: 10.9/km^{2} (28.2/sq mi)
- Time zone: UTC+1 (CET)
  - Summer (DST): UTC+2 (CEST)
- Postal code: 378 06
- Website: www.obecstankov.cz

Staňkov (Czech pronunciation: [ˈstaɲkof]; German: Stankau) is a municipality and village in Jindřichův Hradec District in the South Bohemian Region of the Czech Republic. It has about 200 inhabitants.

Staňkov lies approximately 21 kilometres (13 mi) south of Jindřichův Hradec, 36 km (22 mi) east of České Budějovice, and 130 km (81 mi) south of Prague. It lies along the border with Austria.

== Demographics ==
Historical population
Year	Pop.	±%
1869	638	—
1880	748	+17.2%
1890	777	+3.9%
1900	850	+9.4%
1910	774	−8.9%
1921	667	−13.8%
1930	645	−3.3%
1950	364	−43.6%
1961	358	−1.6%
1970	332	−7.3%
1980	307	−7.5%
1991	246	−19.9%
2001	243	−1.2%
2011	213	−12.3%
2021	193	−9.4%
Source: Censuses
