= Kačlehy =

- Municipality
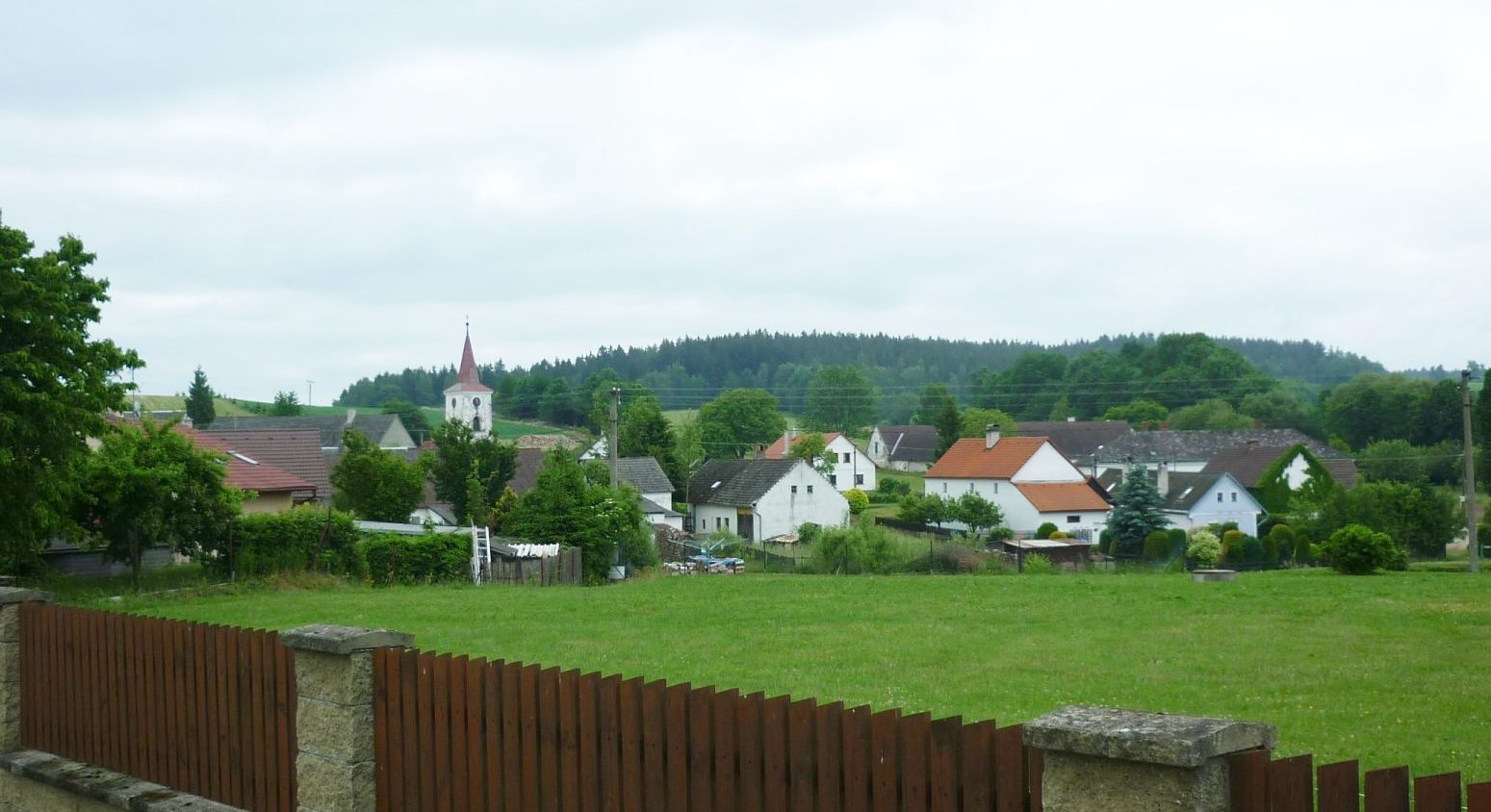
- View from the centre of Kačlehy

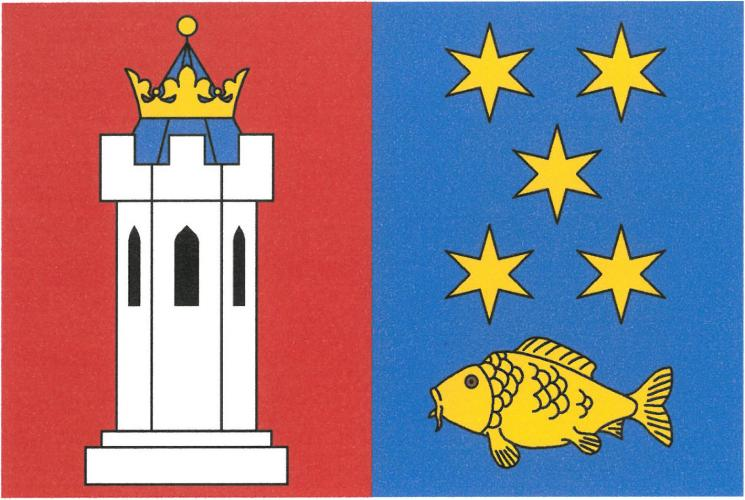
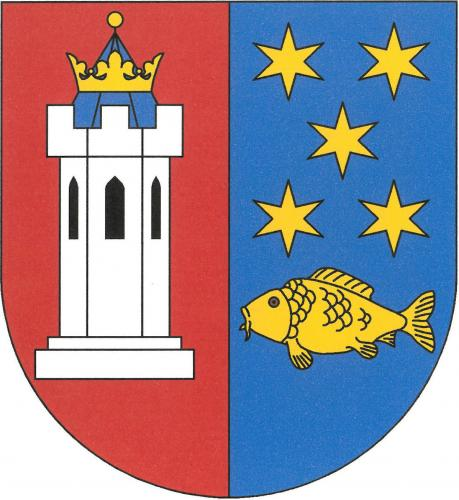
- Flag Coat of arms

- Location in the Czech Republic
- Coordinates: 49°6′32″N 15°4′37″E
- Country: Czech Republic
- Region: South Bohemian
- District: Jindřichův Hradec
- First mentioned: 1399

Area
  - Total: 8.74 km^{2} (3.37 sq mi)
- Elevation: 539 m (1,768 ft)

Population (2026-01-01)
  - Total: 113
  - Density: 12.9/km^{2} (33.5/sq mi)
- Time zone: UTC+1 (CET)
  - Summer (DST): UTC+2 (CEST)
- Postal code: 377 01
- Website: www.obeckaclehy.cz

Kačlehy (German: Gatterschlag) is a municipality and village in Jindřichův Hradec District in the South Bohemian Region of the Czech Republic. It has about 100 inhabitants.

Kačlehy lies approximately 8 kilometres (5 mi) south-east of Jindřichův Hradec, 47 km (29 mi) east of České Budějovice, and 119 km (74 mi) south-east of Prague.

== Demographics ==
Historical population
Year	Pop.	±%
1869	375	—
1880	401	+6.9%
1890	355	−11.5%
1900	344	−3.1%
1910	300	−12.8%
1921	279	−7.0%
1930	271	−2.9%
1950	166	−38.7%
1961	139	−16.3%
1970	113	−18.7%
1980	73	−35.4%
1991	50	−31.5%
2001	60	+20.0%
2011	65	+8.3%
2021	108	+66.2%
Source: Censuses
