= Rudolf Badjura =

Slovene writer and mountaineer (1881–1963)

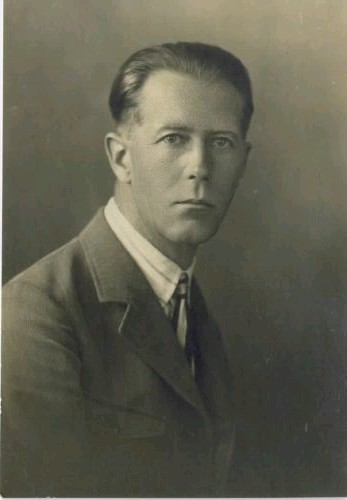
- Born: April 17, 1881; Litija, Austria-Hungary
- Died: September 15, 1963 (aged 82); Ljubljana, Slovenia
- Occupations: Writer; mountaineer; ski instructor

Rudolf Badjura (April 17, 1881 – September 15, 1963) was the first Slovene ski instructor, a mountain hiking enthusiast, and a writer.

Badjura was born in Litija. After graduating from high school in Ljubljana, he enrolled at the Trade Academy in Prague. Badjura authored of the first Slovenian tourism and mountain guides, including Na Triglav (To Triglav, 1913), Vodić kroz jugoslovenske Alpe (Guide to the Yugoslav Alps, 1922), Pohorje (1924), Kozjakovo pogorje (The Kozjak Mountains, 1927), Zasavje (The Central Sava Valley, 1928), Sto izletov po Dolenjskem, Gorenjskem in Notranjskem (One Hundred Excursions in Lower Carniola, Upper Carniola, and Inner Carniola, 1930), Izleti po Karavankah (Excursions in the Karawanks, 1932), and Zimski vodnik po Sloveniji (Winter Guide to Slovenia, 1934). He was a member of the Dren Society, a student club dedicated to mountain hiking. He wrote the first Slovenian skiing manual, Smučar (The Skier, 1924), and Smučarsko terminologijo (Skiing Terminology, 1921). Badjura was also a collector of place names; he compiled these in his work Ljudska geografija (Popular Geography, 1953) and wrote a series of articles on the topic. A continuation of this work was his Krajepisno gradivo (Geographical Material), which remained in manuscript. As a member of the Geographical Society (Slovene: Geografsko društvo), he supervised the correction of nomenclature on topographic maps for Slovenia.
