= Hamr (Jindřichův Hradec District) =

- Municipality
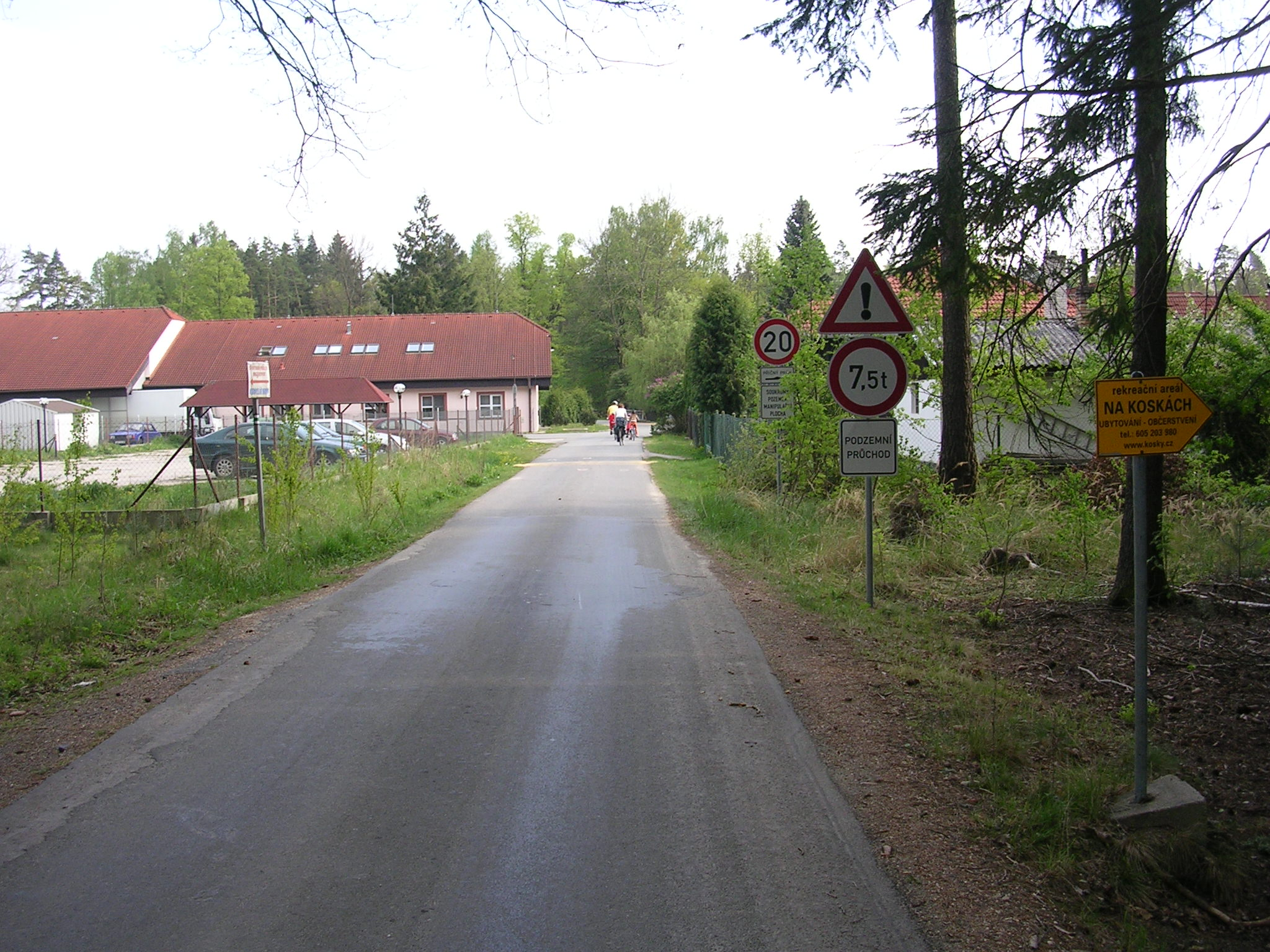
- Kosky, local part of Hamry

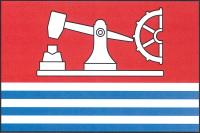
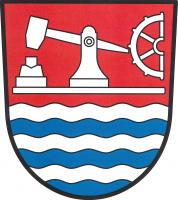
- Flag Coat of arms

- Location in the Czech Republic
- Coordinates: 48°56′58″N 14°54′48″E
- Country: Czech Republic
- Region: South Bohemian
- District: Jindřichův Hradec
- First mentioned: 1549

Area
  - Total: 11.95 km^{2} (4.61 sq mi)
- Elevation: 450 m (1,480 ft)

Population (2026-01-01)
  - Total: 346
  - Density: 29.0/km^{2} (75.0/sq mi)
- Time zone: UTC+1 (CET)
  - Summer (DST): UTC+2 (CEST)
- Postal code: 378 04
- Website: www.ou-hamr.cz

Hamr is a municipality and village in Jindřichův Hradec District in the South Bohemian Region of the Czech Republic. It has about 300 inhabitants.

Hamr lies approximately 24 kilometres (15 mi) south of Jindřichův Hradec, 32 km (20 mi) east of České Budějovice, and 131 km (81 mi) south of Prague.

== Demographics ==
Historical population
Year	Pop.	±%
1869	581	—
1880	567	−2.4%
1890	528	−6.9%
1900	600	+13.6%
1910	573	−4.5%
1921	535	−6.6%
1930	543	+1.5%
1950	403	−25.8%
1961	349	−13.4%
1970	336	−3.7%
1980	339	+0.9%
1991	347	+2.4%
2001	373	+7.5%
2011	348	−6.7%
2021	347	−0.3%
Source: Censuses
