= Gradec, Krško =

Gradec
- Location in Slovenia
- Coordinates: 45°50′13.48″N 15°30′27.72″E
- Country: Slovenia
- Traditional region: Lower Carniola
- Statistical region: Lower Sava
- Municipality: Krško

Area
  - Total: 0.47 km^{2} (0.18 sq mi)
- Elevation: 538.2 m (1,766 ft)

Population (2002)
  - Total: 20
- Postal code: 8312

Gradec (pronounced [ˈɡraːdəts]) is a small village in the Gorjanci Mountains in the Municipality of Krško in eastern Slovenia. The area is part of the traditional region of Lower Carniola. It is now included with the rest of the municipality in the Lower Sava Statistical Region.

The local church is dedicated to Saint Nicholas (Slovene: sveti Miklavž) and belongs to the Parish of Sveti Križ–Podbočje. It was built in the late 13th to early 14th century in the Romanesque style. Chance finds and the morphology of the surrounding terrain indicate possible Roman occupation of the site.
