= Hradec (Havlíčkův Brod District) =

- Municipality
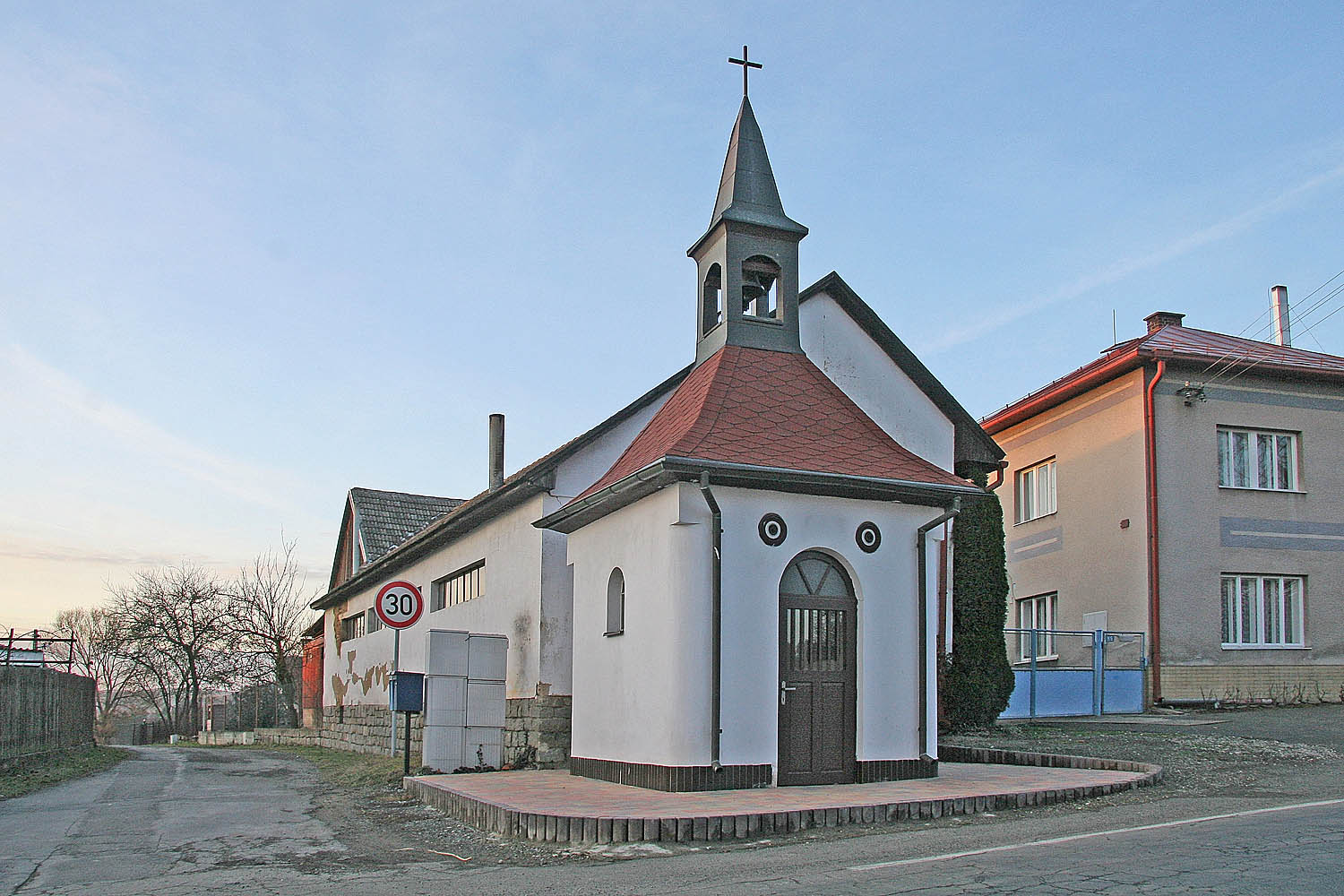
- Chapel of Saint Wenceslaus

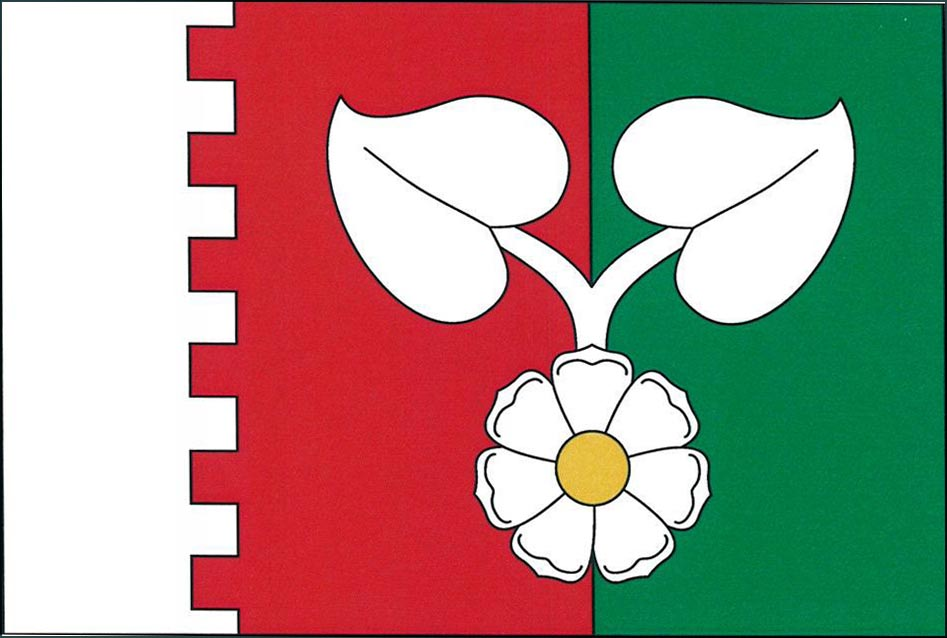
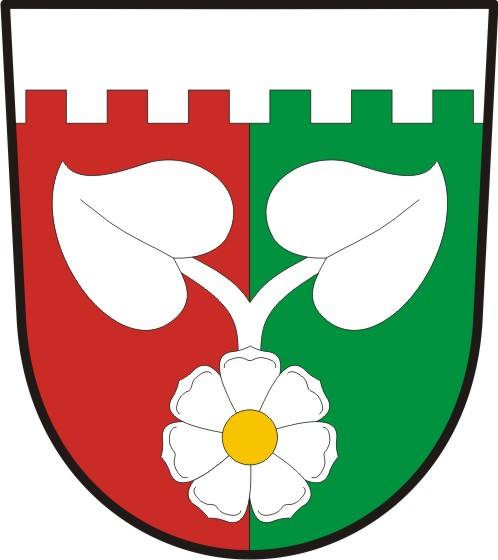
- Flag Coat of arms

- Location in the Czech Republic
- Coordinates: 49°42′26″N 15°17′44″E
- Country: Czech Republic
- Region: Vysočina
- District: Havlíčkův Brod
- First mentioned: 1550

Area
  - Total: 5.67 km^{2} (2.19 sq mi)
- Elevation: 450 m (1,480 ft)

Population (2026-01-01)
  - Total: 312
  - Density: 55.0/km^{2} (143/sq mi)
- Time zone: UTC+1 (CET)
  - Summer (DST): UTC+2 (CEST)
- Postal code: 584 01
- Website: obec-hradec.cz

Hradec is a municipality and village in Havlíčkův Brod District in the Vysočina Region of the Czech Republic. It has about 300 inhabitants.

Hradec lies approximately 24 kilometres (15 mi) north-west of the municipality of Havlíčkův Brod, 41 km (25 mi) north-west of Jihlava, and 76 km (47 mi) south-east of Prague.

== Administrative division ==
Hradec consists of two municipal parts (in brackets population according to the 2021 census):

- Hradec (209)
- Hamry (30)

== Demographics ==
Historical population
Year	Pop.	±%
1869	497	—
1880	434	−12.7%
1890	393	−9.4%
1900	386	−1.8%
1910	393	+1.8%
1921	380	−3.3%
1930	340	−10.5%
1950	289	−15.0%
1961	278	−3.8%
1970	269	−3.2%
1980	266	−1.1%
1991	237	−10.9%
2001	232	−2.1%
2011	231	−0.4%
2021	239	+3.5%
Source: Censuses
