= Bořetín =

Bořetín may refer to places in the Czech Republic:

- Bořetín (Jindřichův Hradec District), a municipality and village in the South Bohemian Region
- Bořetín (Pelhřimov District), a municipality and village in the Vysočina Region
- Bořetín, a village and part of Stružnice in the Liberec Region
