= Bednárec =

- Municipality
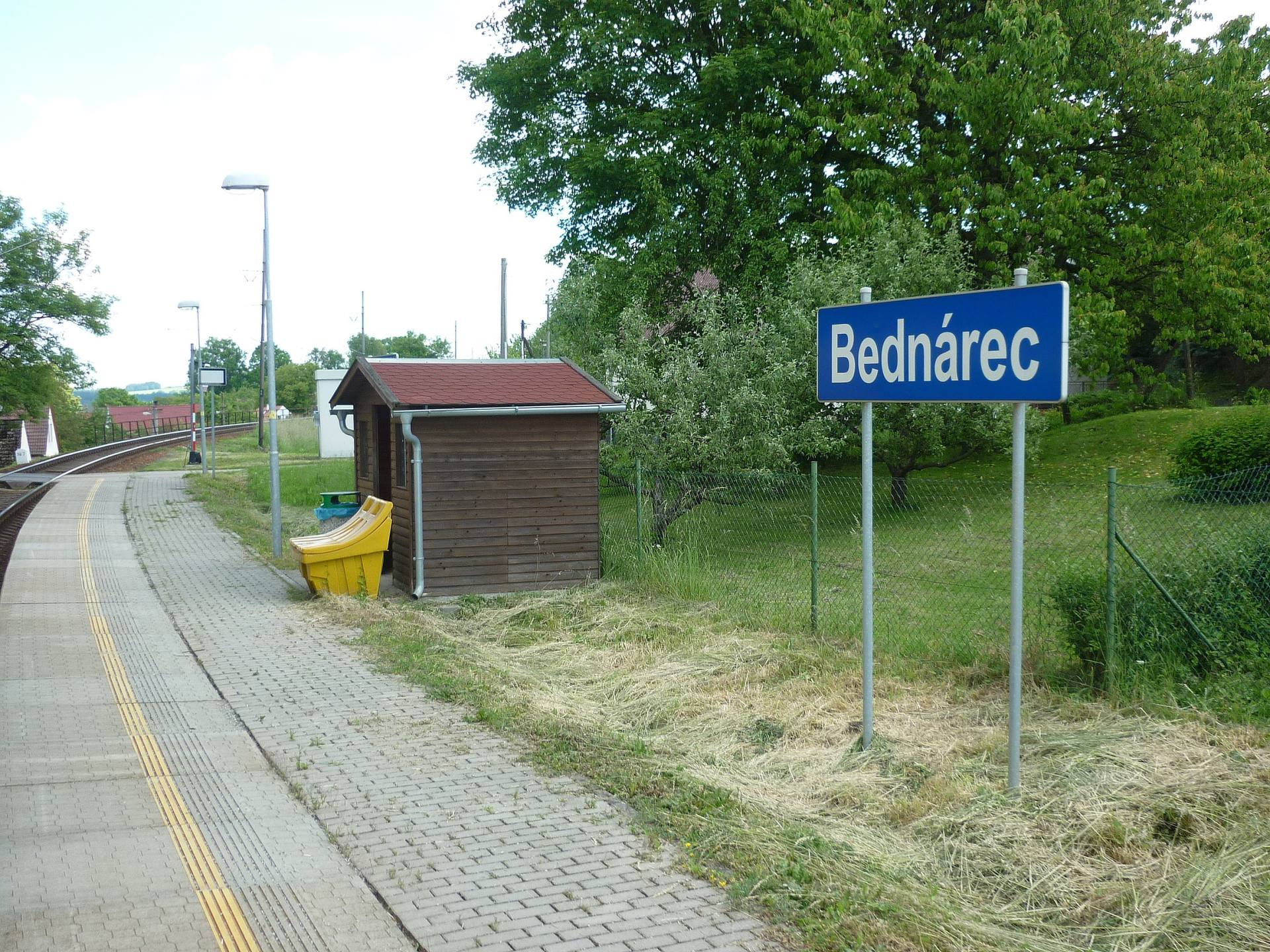
- Train stop

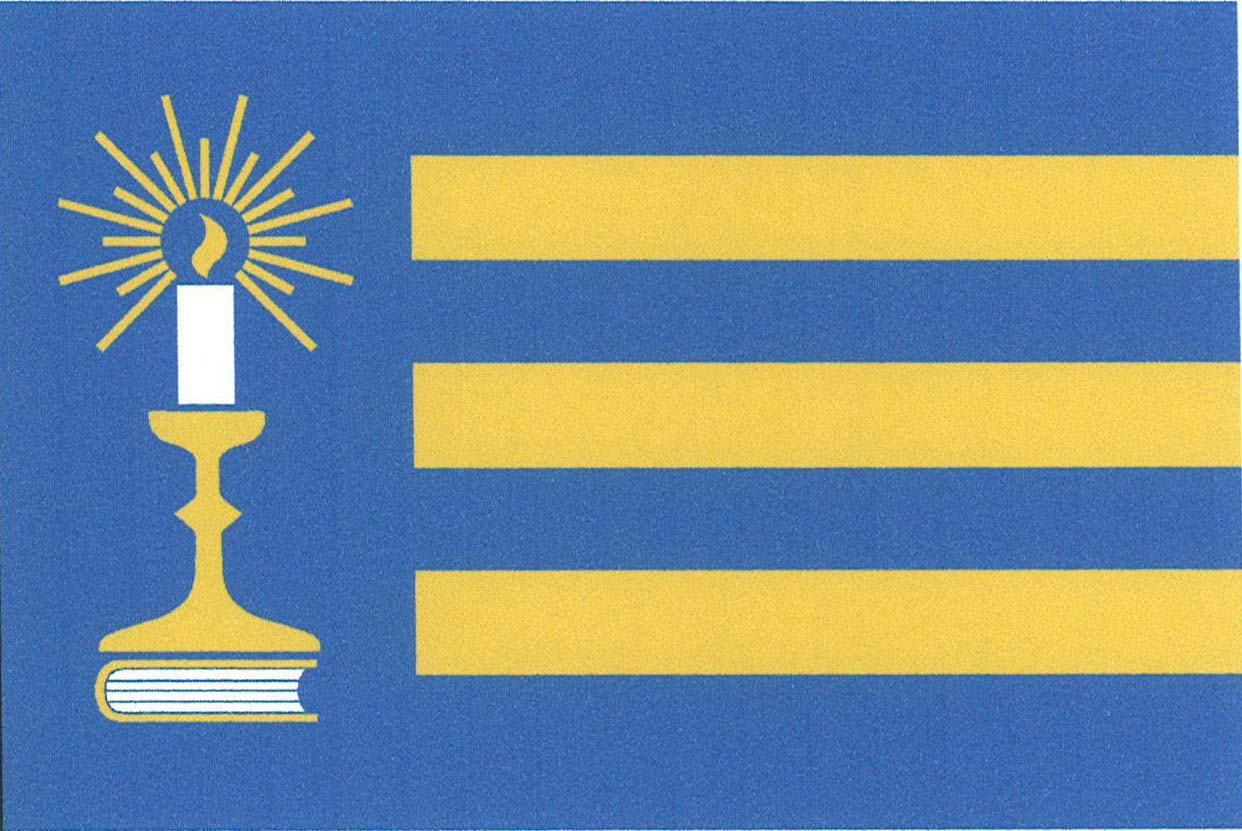
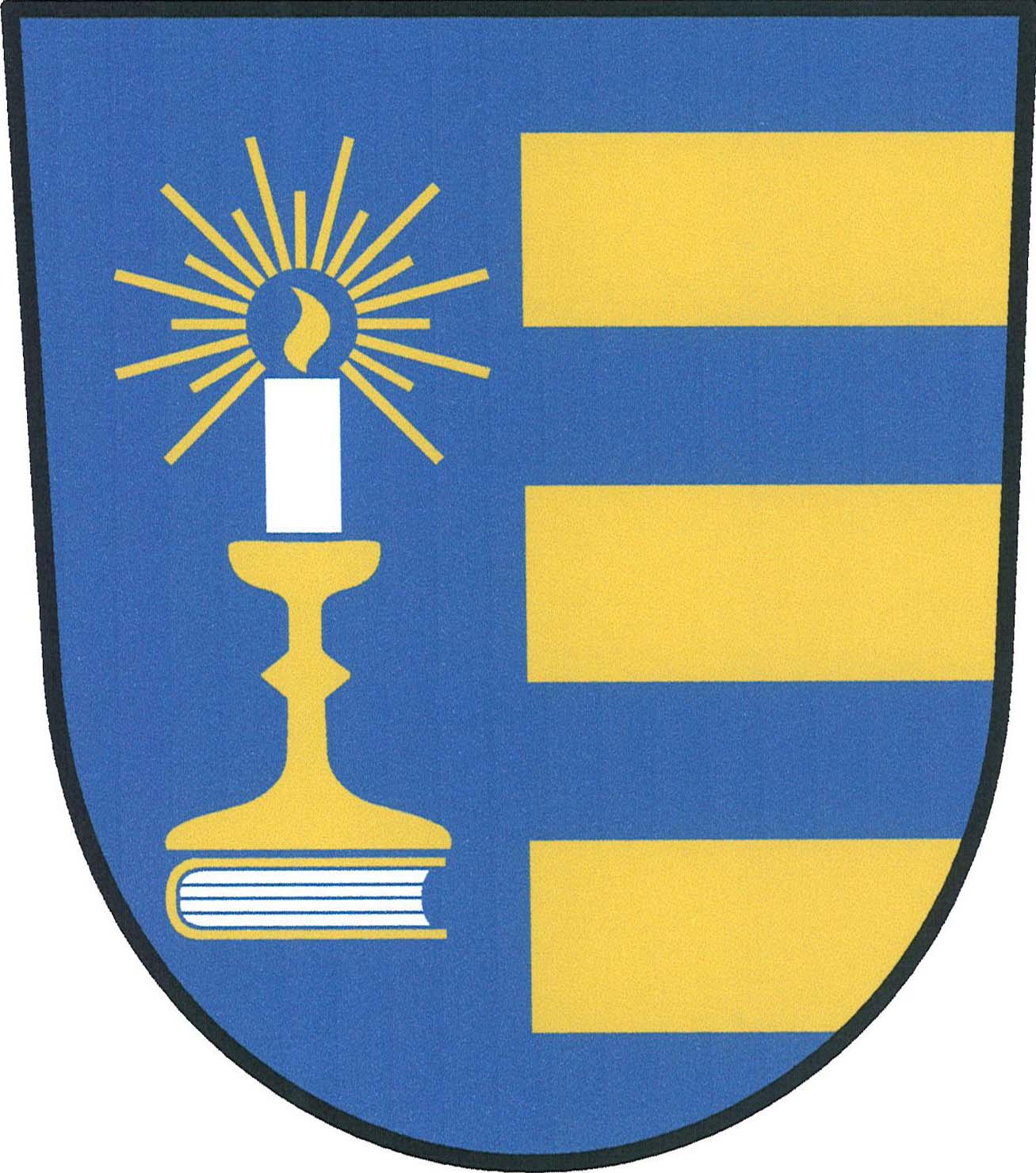
- Flag Coat of arms

- Location in the Czech Republic
- Coordinates: 49°11′43″N 15°5′36″E
- Country: Czech Republic
- Region: South Bohemian
- District: Jindřichův Hradec
- First mentioned: 1377

Area
  - Total: 7.81 km^{2} (3.02 sq mi)
- Elevation: 515 m (1,690 ft)

Population (2026-01-01)
  - Total: 115
  - Density: 14.7/km^{2} (38.1/sq mi)
- Time zone: UTC+1 (CET)
  - Summer (DST): UTC+2 (CEST)
- Postal code: 378 42
- Website: www.bednarec.cz

Bednárec (German: Groß Bernharz) is a municipality and village in Jindřichův Hradec District in the South Bohemian Region of the Czech Republic. It has about 100 inhabitants.

== Demographics ==
Historical population
Year	Pop.	±%
1869	376	—
1880	383	+1.9%
1890	370	−3.4%
1900	383	+3.5%
1910	344	−10.2%
1921	332	−3.5%
1930	306	−7.8%
1950	215	−29.7%
1961	239	+11.2%
1970	196	−18.0%
1980	142	−27.6%
1991	124	−12.7%
2001	102	−17.7%
2011	103	+1.0%
2021	116	+12.6%
Source: Censuses
