= Pleše =

- Municipality
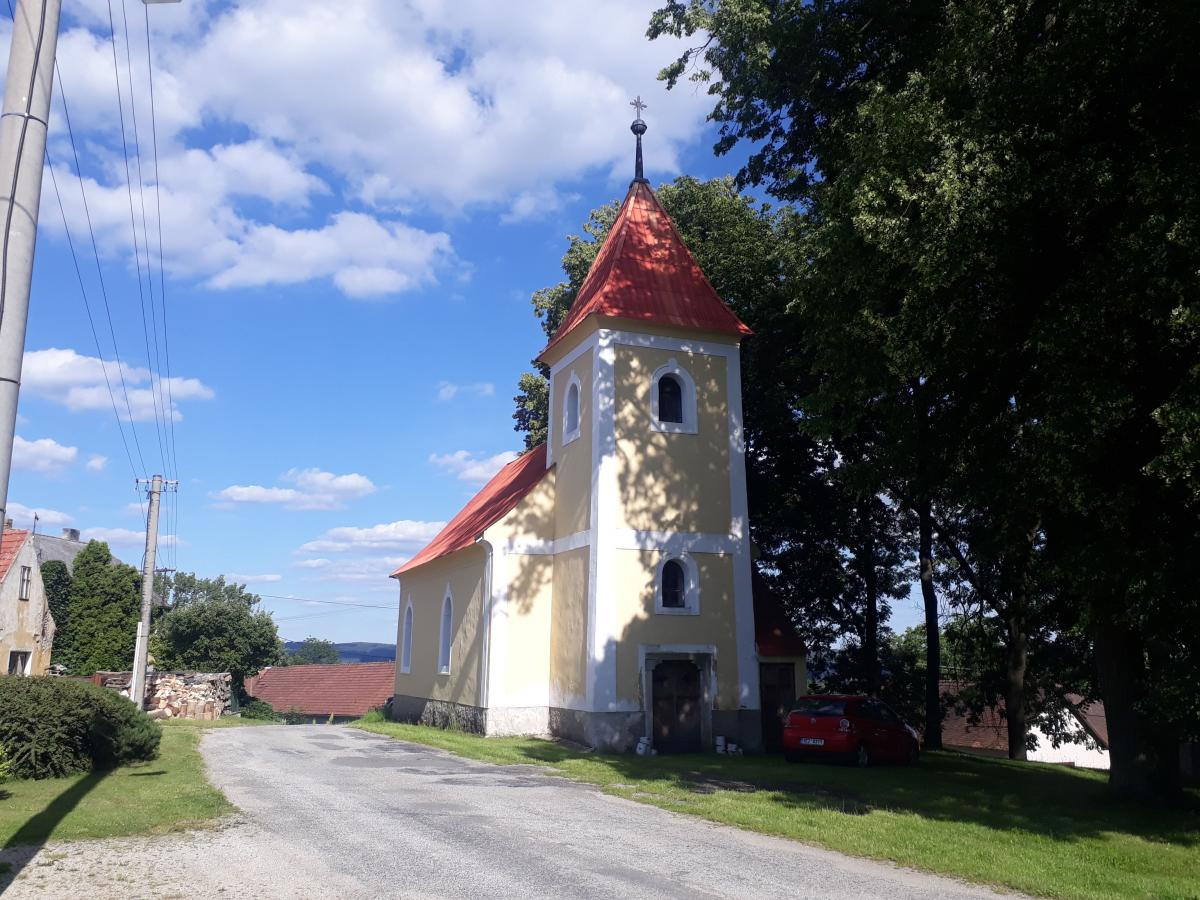
- Chapel of Saints John and Paul

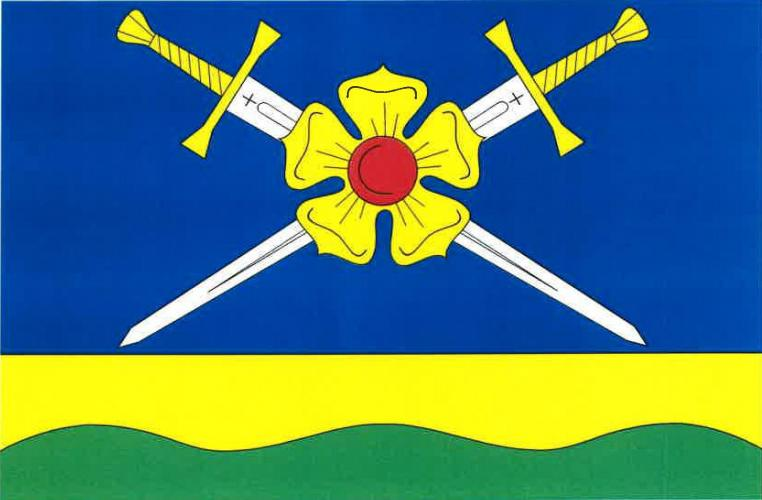
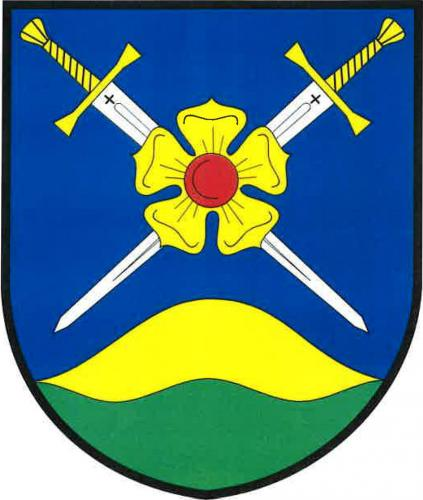
- Flag Coat of arms

- Location in the Czech Republic
- Coordinates: 49°11′44″N 14°49′17″E
- Country: Czech Republic
- Region: South Bohemian
- District: Jindřichův Hradec
- First mentioned: 1297

Area
  - Total: 9.84 km^{2} (3.80 sq mi)
- Elevation: 487 m (1,598 ft)

Population (2026-01-01)
  - Total: 183
  - Density: 18.6/km^{2} (48.2/sq mi)
- Time zone: UTC+1 (CET)
  - Summer (DST): UTC+2 (CEST)
- Postal code: 378 21
- Website: www.obecplese.cz

Pleše is a municipality and village in Jindřichův Hradec District in the South Bohemian Region of the Czech Republic. It has about 200 inhabitants.

Pleše lies approximately 15 kilometres (9 mi) west of Jindřichův Hradec, 35 km (22 mi) north-east of České Budějovice, and 104 km (65 mi) south of Prague.

== Demographics ==
Historical population
Year	Pop.	±%
1869	485	—
1880	525	+8.2%
1890	468	−10.9%
1900	471	+0.6%
1910	499	+5.9%
1921	489	−2.0%
1930	434	−11.2%
1950	309	−28.8%
1961	306	−1.0%
1970	267	−12.7%
1980	236	−11.6%
1991	182	−22.9%
2001	178	−2.2%
2011	181	+1.7%
2021	171	−5.5%
Source: Censuses
