= Jindřichův Hradec District =

Jindřichův Hradec District Okres Jindřichův Hradec
- District
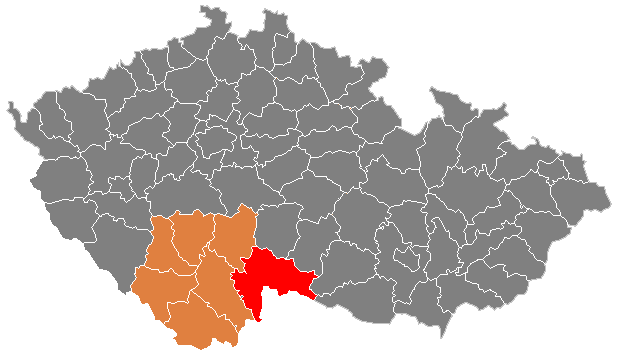
- Location in the South Bohemian Region within the Czech Republic
- Coordinates: 49°9′N 15°4′E
- Country: Czech Republic
- Region: South Bohemian
- Capital: Jindřichův Hradec

Area
  - Total: 1,943.84 km^{2} (750.52 sq mi)

Population (2026)
  - Total: 89,343
  - Density: 45.962/km^{2} (119.04/sq mi)
- Time zone: UTC+1 (CET)
  - Summer (DST): UTC+2 (CEST)
- Municipalities: 106
- * Towns: 13
- * Market towns: 2

Jindřichův Hradec District (Czech: okres Jindřichův Hradec) is a district in the South Bohemian Region of the Czech Republic. Its capital is the town of Jindřichův Hradec.

== Administrative division ==
Jindřichův Hradec District is divided into three administrative districts of municipalities with extended competence: Jindřichův Hradec, Dačice and Třeboň.

=== List of municipalities ===
Towns are marked in bold and market towns in italics:

Báňovice - Bednárec - Bednáreček - Blažejov - Bořetín - Březina - Budeč - Budíškovice - Cep - Červený Hrádek - České Velenice - Český Rudolec - Chlum u Třeboně - Číměř - Cizkrajov - Člunek - Dačice - Dešná - Deštná - Dívčí Kopy - Dobrohošť - Dolní Pěna - Dolní Žďár - Domanín - Doňov - Drunče - Dunajovice - Dvory nad Lužnicí - Frahelž - Hadravova Rosička - Halámky - Hamr - Hatín - Heřmaneč - Horní Meziříčko - Horní Němčice - Horní Pěna - Horní Radouň - Horní Skrýchov - Horní Slatina - Hospříz - Hrachoviště - Hříšice - Jarošov nad Nežárkou - Jilem - Jindřichův Hradec - Kačlehy - Kamenný Malíkov - Kardašova Řečice - Klec - Kostelní Radouň - Kostelní Vydří - Kunžak - Lásenice - Lodhéřov - Lomnice nad Lužnicí - Lužnice - Majdalena - Nová Bystřice - Nová Olešná - Nová Včelnice - Nová Ves nad Lužnicí - Novosedly nad Nežárkou - Okrouhlá Radouň - Peč - Písečné - Pístina - Plavsko - Pleše - Pluhův Žďár - Polště - Ponědraž - Ponědrážka - Popelín - Příbraz - Rapšach - Ratiboř - Rodvínov - Roseč - Rosička - Slavonice - Smržov - Staňkov - Staré Hobzí - Staré Město pod Landštejnem - Stráž nad Nežárkou - Strmilov - Stříbřec - Střížovice - Studená - Suchdol nad Lužnicí - Světce - Třebětice - Třeboň - Újezdec - Velký Ratmírov - Vícemil - Višňová - Vlčetínec - Volfířov - Vydří - Záblatí - Záhoří - Zahrádky - Žďár - Županovice

== Geography ==
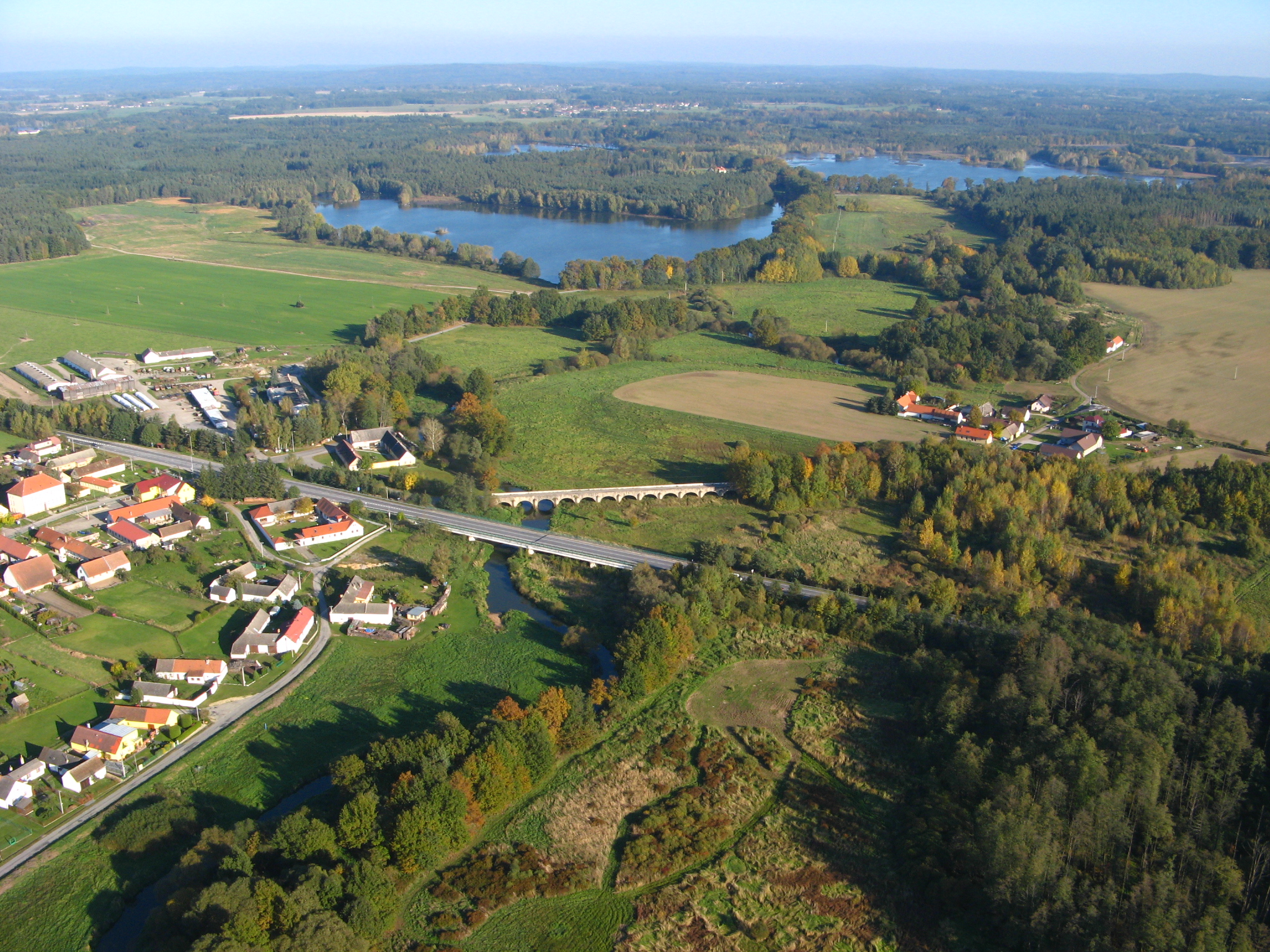
Landscape around Třeboň

Jindřichův Hradec District is the second largest Czech district with an area of 1,944 km^{2} (751 sq mi). It borders Austria in the south. About a fifth of the district territory in the east belongs to the historical land of Moravia.

The relief is rugged and hilly except in the west, which belongs to a tectonic depression. The territory extends into four geomorphological mesoregions: Javořice Highlands (south and centre), Třeboň Basin (west), Křemešník Highlands (north) and Křižanov Highlands (east). The highest point of the district is a contour line on the mountain Javořice in Studená with an elevation of 804 m (2,638 ft), the lowest point is the river bed of the Lužnice in Ponědrážka at 410 m (1,350 ft).

From the total district area of 1,943.8 km^{2} (750.5 sq mi), agricultural land occupies 902.1 km^{2} (348.3 sq mi), forests occupy 761.1 km^{2} (293.9 sq mi), and water area occupies 136.1 km^{2} (52.5 sq mi). Forests cover 39.2% of the district's area.

The territory is rich in watercourses and ponds. The most important rivers are the Lužnice and its tributary, the Nežárka, both flowing through the western part of the district. The eastern part is drained by the Moravian Thaya. The area of the Třeboň Basin is known for its fishpond system, which includes the largest pond in the country Rožmberk and many other large ponds.

The western part of the district is protected as the Třeboňsko Protected Landscape Area.

== Demographics ==
Historical population

Year	Pop.	±%
1869	128,421	—
1880	131,613	+2.5%
1890	130,159	−1.1%
1900	132,306	+1.6%
1910	132,780	+0.4%

Year	Pop.	±%
1921	125,161	−5.7%
1930	119,639	−4.4%
1950	91,994	−23.1%
1961	91,494	−0.5%
1970	89,521	−2.2%

Year	Pop.	±%
1980	93,657	+4.6%
1991	93,048	−0.7%
2001	92,887	−0.2%
2011	90,604	−2.5%
2021	87,256	−3.7%

Source: Censuses

=== Most populous municipalities ===
Name	Population	Area (km^{2})
Jindřichův Hradec	20,369	74
Třeboň	8,249	98
Dačice	7,118	67
České Velenice	3,867	12
Suchdol nad Lužnicí	3,559	64
Nová Bystřice	3,209	82
Kardašova Řečice	2,227	46
Slavonice	2,207	46
Studená	2,177	45
Nová Včelnice	2,165	10

== Economy ==
The largest employers with headquarters in Jindřichův Hradec District and at least 500 employees are:

Economic entity	Location	Number of employees	Main activity
Jindřichův Hradec Hospital	Jindřichův Hradec	1,000–1,499	Health care
Magna Cartech	České Velenice	500–999	Sheet metal pressing and welding
THK Rhythm Automotive Czech	Dačice	500–999	Manufacture of parts for motor vehicles
Centrum sociálních služeb Jindřichův Hradec	Jindřichův Hradec	500–999	Residential care activities
Slatinné lázně Třeboň	Třeboň	500–999	Health care

== Transport ==
There are no motorways in the district. The most important roads are I/24 and I/34, which lead from České Budějovice through the western part of the district to the border with Austria, and are part of the European route E49.

== Sights ==
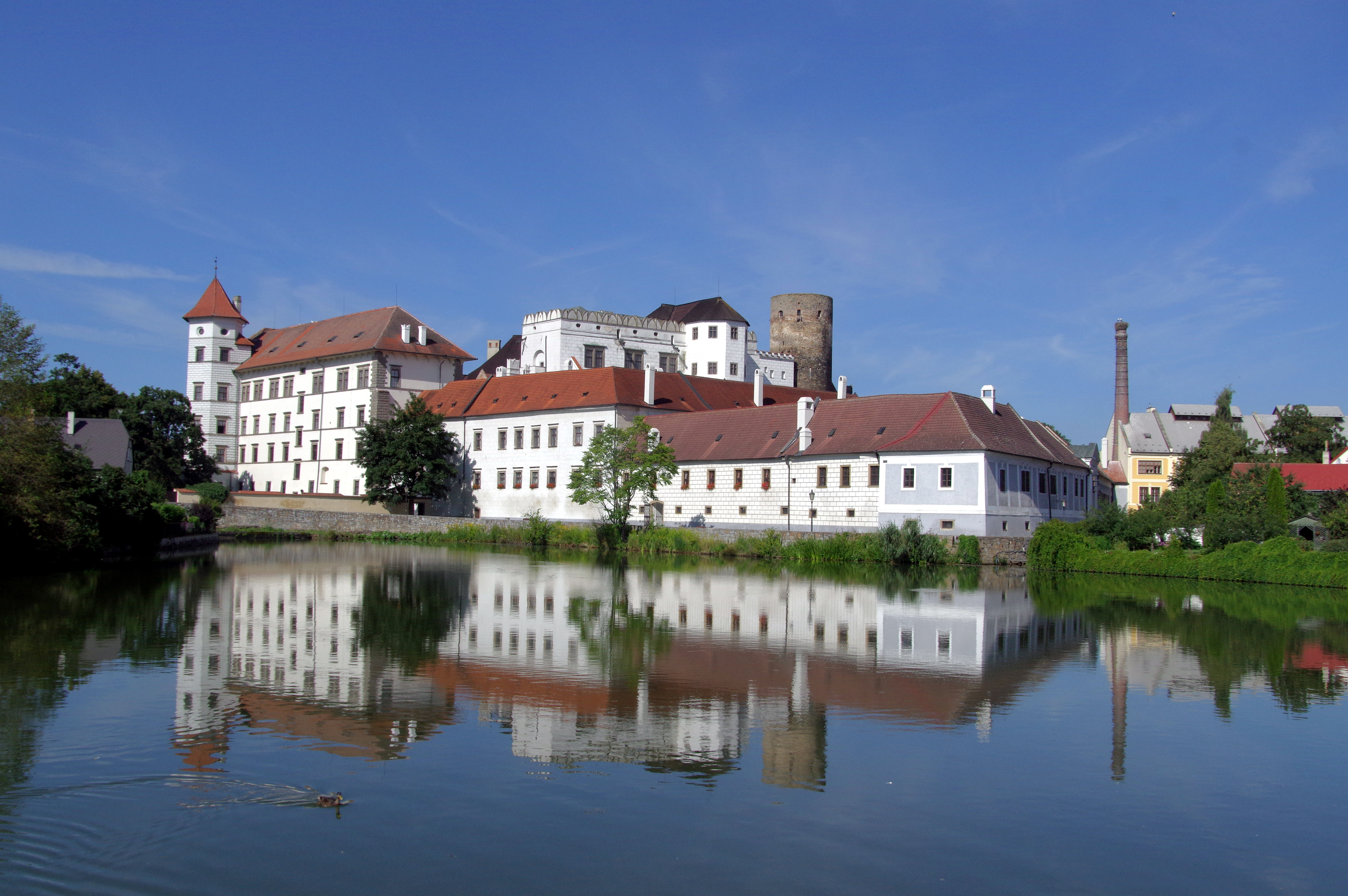
Jindřichův Hradec Castle

The most important monuments in the district, protected as national cultural monuments, are:

- Jindřichův Hradec Castle
- Augustinian monastery with the Church of Saint Giles in Třeboň
- Červená Lhota Castle
- Dačice Castle
- Třeboň Castle
- Fishponds of the Třeboň Basin
- Water saw in Stoječín-Penikov

The best-preserved settlements, protected as monument reservations and monument zones, are:

- Jindřichův Hradec (monument reservation)
- Slavonice (monument reservation)
- Třeboň (monument reservation)
- Dačice
- Nová Bystřice
- Hrutkov
- Lutová
- Malíkov nad Nežárkou
- Nová Ves
- Pístina
- Plačovice
- Ponědrážka
- Příbraz
- Žíteč

The most visited tourist destinations are Zoo Na Hrádečku in Horní Pěna and Jindřichův Hradec Castle.
