= Kamenný Malíkov =

- Municipality
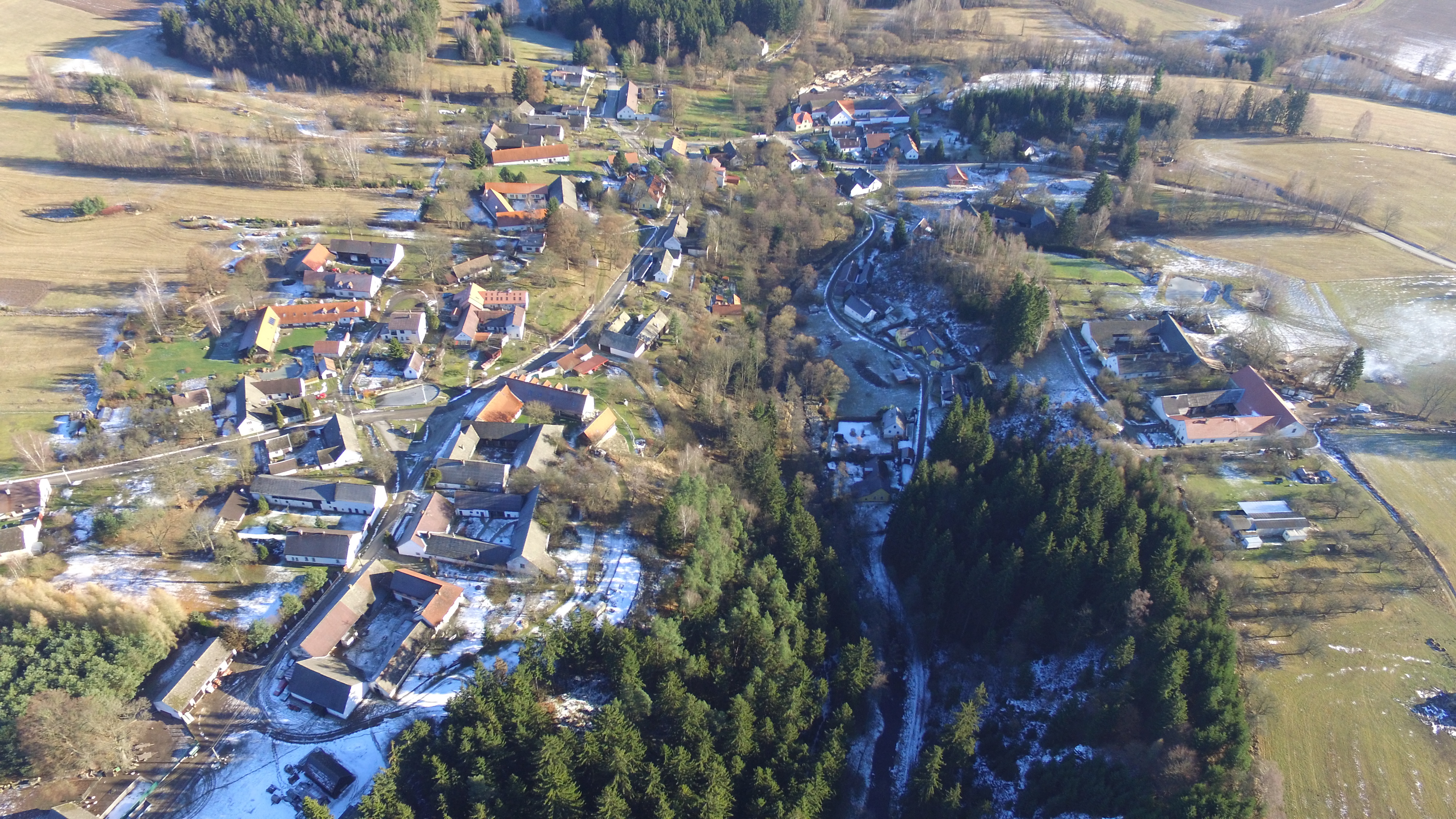
- Aerial view

- Flag Coat of arms

- Location in the Czech Republic
- Coordinates: 49°12′43″N 15°7′20″E
- Country: Czech Republic
- Region: South Bohemian
- District: Jindřichův Hradec
- First mentioned: 1654

Area
  - Total: 4.73 km^{2} (1.83 sq mi)
- Elevation: 526 m (1,726 ft)

Population (2026-01-01)
  - Total: 78
  - Density: 16/km^{2} (43/sq mi)
- Time zone: UTC+1 (CET)
  - Summer (DST): UTC+2 (CEST)
- Postal code: 378 42
- Website: kamennymalikov.cz

Kamenný Malíkov (German: Stein Moliken) is a municipality and village in Jindřichův Hradec District in the South Bohemian Region of the Czech Republic. It has about 80 inhabitants.

Kamenný Malíkov lies approximately 12 kilometres (7 mi) north-east of Jindřichův Hradec, 55 km (34 mi) north-east of České Budějovice, and 110 km (68 mi) south-east of Prague.

== Demographics ==
Historical population
Year	Pop.	±%
1869	276	—
1880	267	−3.3%
1890	289	+8.2%
1900	277	−4.2%
1910	276	−0.4%
1921	285	+3.3%
1930	277	−2.8%
1950	158	−43.0%
1961	164	+3.8%
1970	130	−20.7%
1980	109	−16.2%
1991	75	−31.2%
2001	69	−8.0%
2011	54	−21.7%
2021	76	+40.7%
Source: Censuses
