= Hospříz =

- Municipality
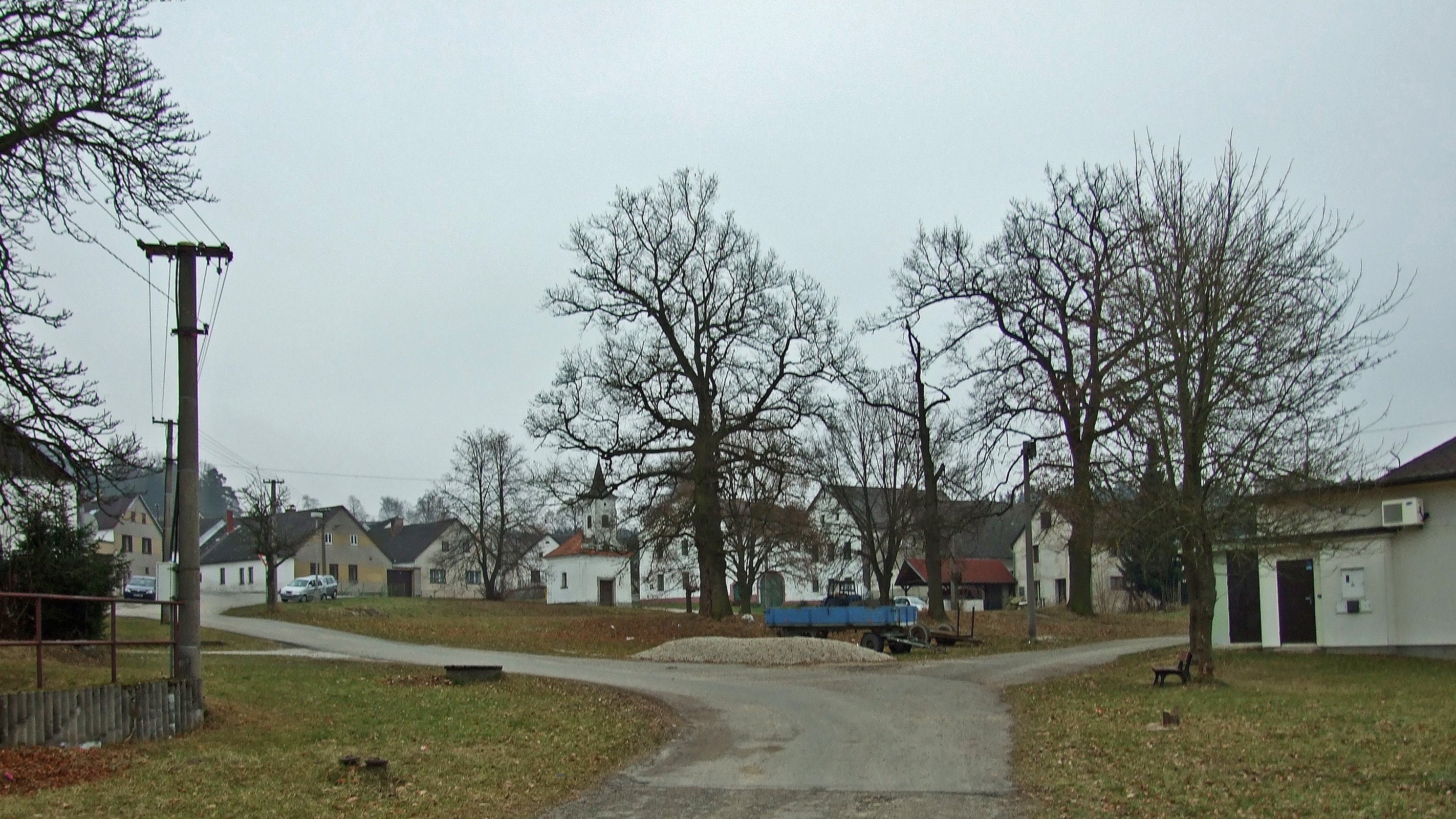
- Centre of Hospříz

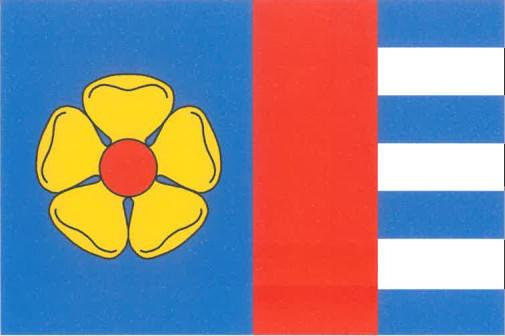
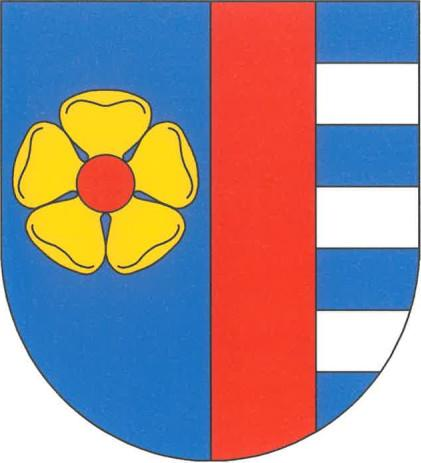
- Flag Coat of arms

- Location in the Czech Republic
- Coordinates: 49°7′43″N 15°5′8″E
- Country: Czech Republic
- Region: South Bohemian
- District: Jindřichův Hradec
- First mentioned: 1654

Area
  - Total: 8.60 km^{2} (3.32 sq mi)
- Elevation: 525 m (1,722 ft)

Population (2026-01-01)
  - Total: 457
  - Density: 53.1/km^{2} (138/sq mi)
- Time zone: UTC+1 (CET)
  - Summer (DST): UTC+2 (CEST)
- Postal code: 377 01
- Website: www.hospriz.cz

Hospříz is a municipality and village in Jindřichův Hradec District in the South Bohemian Region of the Czech Republic. It has about 500 inhabitants.

Hospříz lies approximately 8 kilometres (5 mi) east of Jindřichův Hradec, 49 km (30 mi) east of České Budějovice, and 118 km (73 mi) south-east of Prague.

== Administrative division ==
Hospříz consists of two municipal parts (in brackets population according to the 2021 census):

- Hospříz (386)
- Hrutkov (31)

== Demographics ==
Historical population
Year	Pop.	±%
1869	504	—
1880	431	−14.5%
1890	466	+8.1%
1900	389	−16.5%
1910	367	−5.7%
1921	375	+2.2%
1930	379	+1.1%
1950	276	−27.2%
1961	257	−6.9%
1970	279	+8.6%
1980	291	+4.3%
1991	346	+18.9%
2001	368	+6.4%
2011	400	+8.7%
2021	417	+4.2%
Source: Censuses
