= Dívčí Kopy =

- Municipality
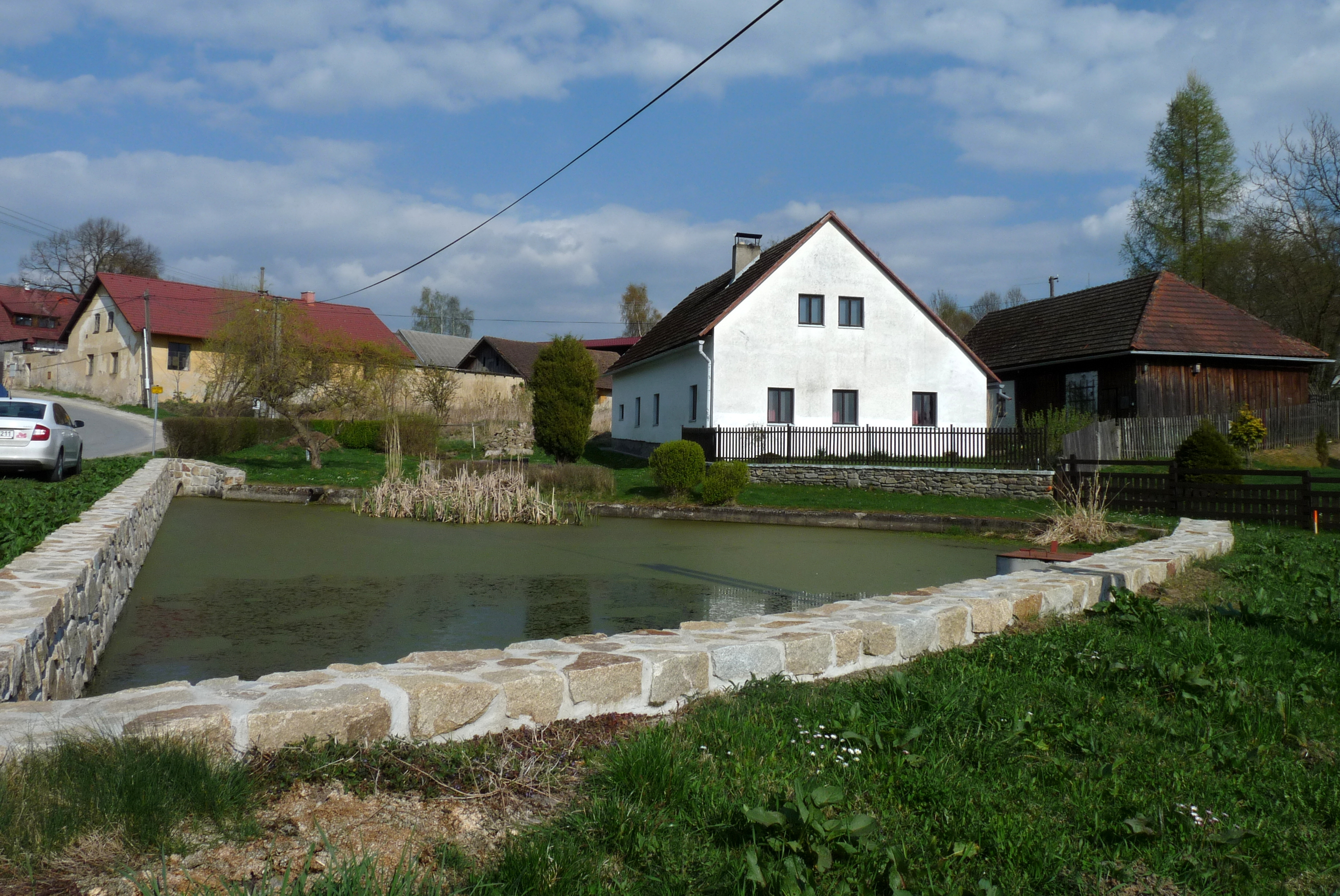
- Pond in the centre of Dívčí Kopy

- Location in the Czech Republic
- Coordinates: 49°15′37″N 15°2′45″E
- Country: Czech Republic
- Region: South Bohemian
- District: Jindřichův Hradec
- First mentioned: 1267

Area
  - Total: 2.72 km^{2} (1.05 sq mi)
- Elevation: 565 m (1,854 ft)

Population (2026-01-01)
  - Total: 65
  - Density: 24/km^{2} (62/sq mi)
- Time zone: UTC+1 (CET)
  - Summer (DST): UTC+2 (CEST)
- Postal code: 378 42
- Website: divcikopy.cz

Dívčí Kopy (German: Ditschkop) is a municipality and village in Jindřichův Hradec District in the South Bohemian Region of the Czech Republic. It has about 70 inhabitants.

== Demographics ==
Historical population
Year	Pop.	±%
1869	158	—
1880	216	+36.7%
1890	258	+19.4%
1900	280	+8.5%
1910	279	−0.4%
1921	259	−7.2%
1930	212	−18.1%
1950	150	−29.2%
1961	160	+6.7%
1970	111	−30.6%
1980	79	−28.8%
1991	59	−25.3%
2001	61	+3.4%
2011	64	+4.9%
2021	74	+15.6%
Source: Censuses
