= Vlčetínec =

- Municipality
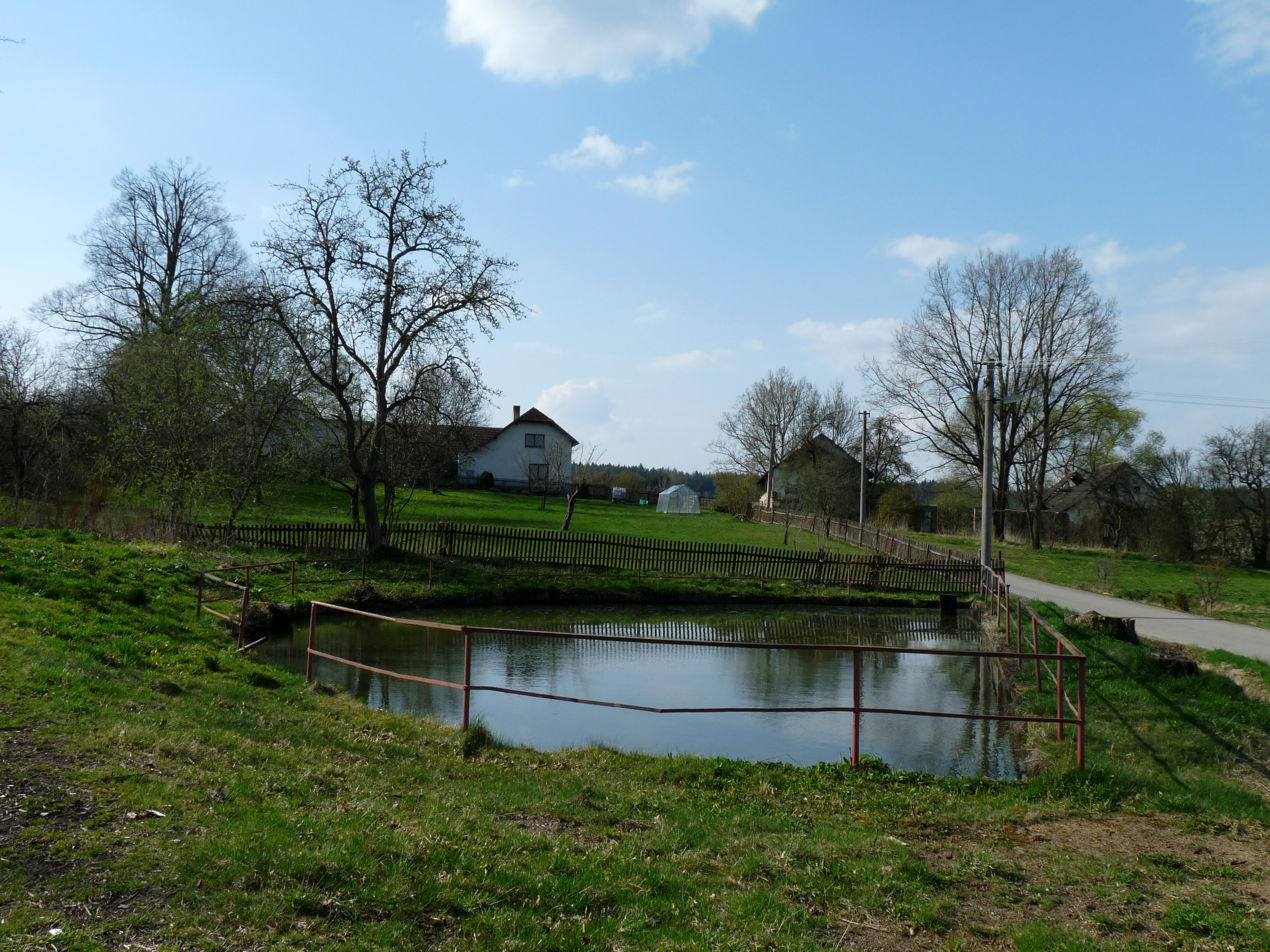
- Pond

- Location in the Czech Republic
- Coordinates: 49°15′52″N 15°3′16″E
- Country: Czech Republic
- Region: South Bohemian
- District: Jindřichův Hradec
- First mentioned: 1359

Area
  - Total: 6.22 km^{2} (2.40 sq mi)
- Elevation: 545 m (1,788 ft)

Population (2026-01-01)
  - Total: 51
  - Density: 8.2/km^{2} (21/sq mi)
- Time zone: UTC+1 (CET)
  - Summer (DST): UTC+2 (CEST)
- Postal code: 378 42
- Website: www.vlcetinec.cz

Vlčetínec is a municipality and village in Jindřichův Hradec District in the South Bohemian Region of the Czech Republic. It has about 50 inhabitants.

Vlčetínec lies approximately 14 kilometres (9 mi) north of Jindřichův Hradec, 54 km (34 mi) north-east of České Budějovice, and 103 km (64 mi) south-east of Prague.

== Demographics ==
Historical population
Year	Pop.	±%
1869	192	—
1880	235	+22.4%
1890	219	−6.8%
1900	186	−15.1%
1910	184	−1.1%
1921	197	+7.1%
1930	176	−10.7%
1950	144	−18.2%
1961	117	−18.8%
1970	89	−23.9%
1980	89	+0.0%
1991	62	−30.3%
2001	59	−4.8%
2011	55	−6.8%
2021	41	−25.5%
Source: Censuses
