= Roseč =

- Municipality
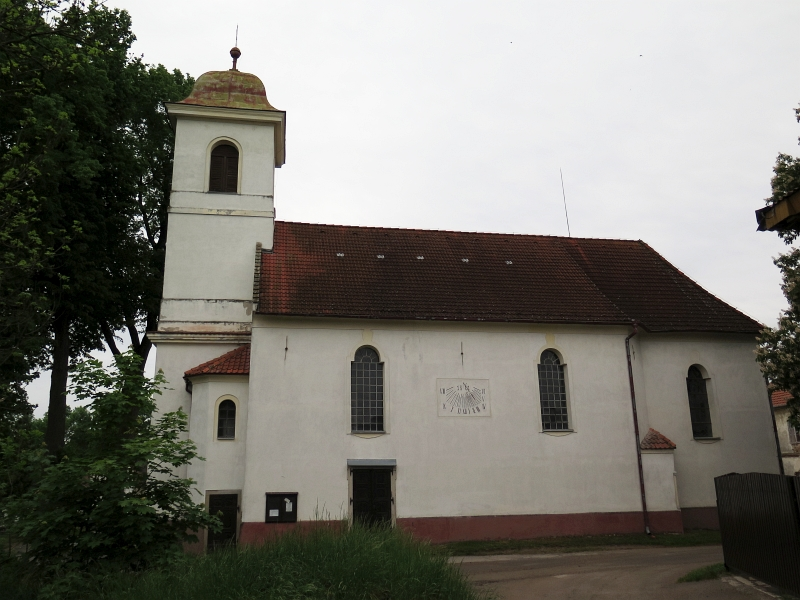
- Church of Saints Simon and Jude

- Flag Coat of arms

- Location in the Czech Republic
- Coordinates: 49°7′40″N 14°54′39″E
- Country: Czech Republic
- Region: South Bohemian
- District: Jindřichův Hradec
- First mentioned: 1367

Area
  - Total: 5.46 km^{2} (2.11 sq mi)
- Elevation: 502 m (1,647 ft)

Population (2026-01-01)
  - Total: 227
  - Density: 41.6/km^{2} (108/sq mi)
- Time zone: UTC+1 (CET)
  - Summer (DST): UTC+2 (CEST)
- Postal code: 377 01
- Website: www.rosec.cz

Roseč is a municipality and village in Jindřichův Hradec District in the South Bohemian Region of the Czech Republic. It has about 200 inhabitants.

Roseč lies approximately 8 kilometres (5 mi) west of Jindřichův Hradec, 37 km (23 mi) north-east of České Budějovice, and 112 km (70 mi) south of Prague.

== Demographics ==
Historical population
Year	Pop.	±%
1869	451	—
1880	459	+1.8%
1890	437	−4.8%
1900	411	−5.9%
1910	405	−1.5%
1921	385	−4.9%
1930	341	−11.4%
1950	233	−31.7%
1961	238	+2.1%
1970	208	−12.6%
1980	214	+2.9%
1991	214	+0.0%
2001	199	−7.0%
2011	208	+4.5%
2021	210	+1.0%
Source: Censuses
