= Doňov =

- Municipality
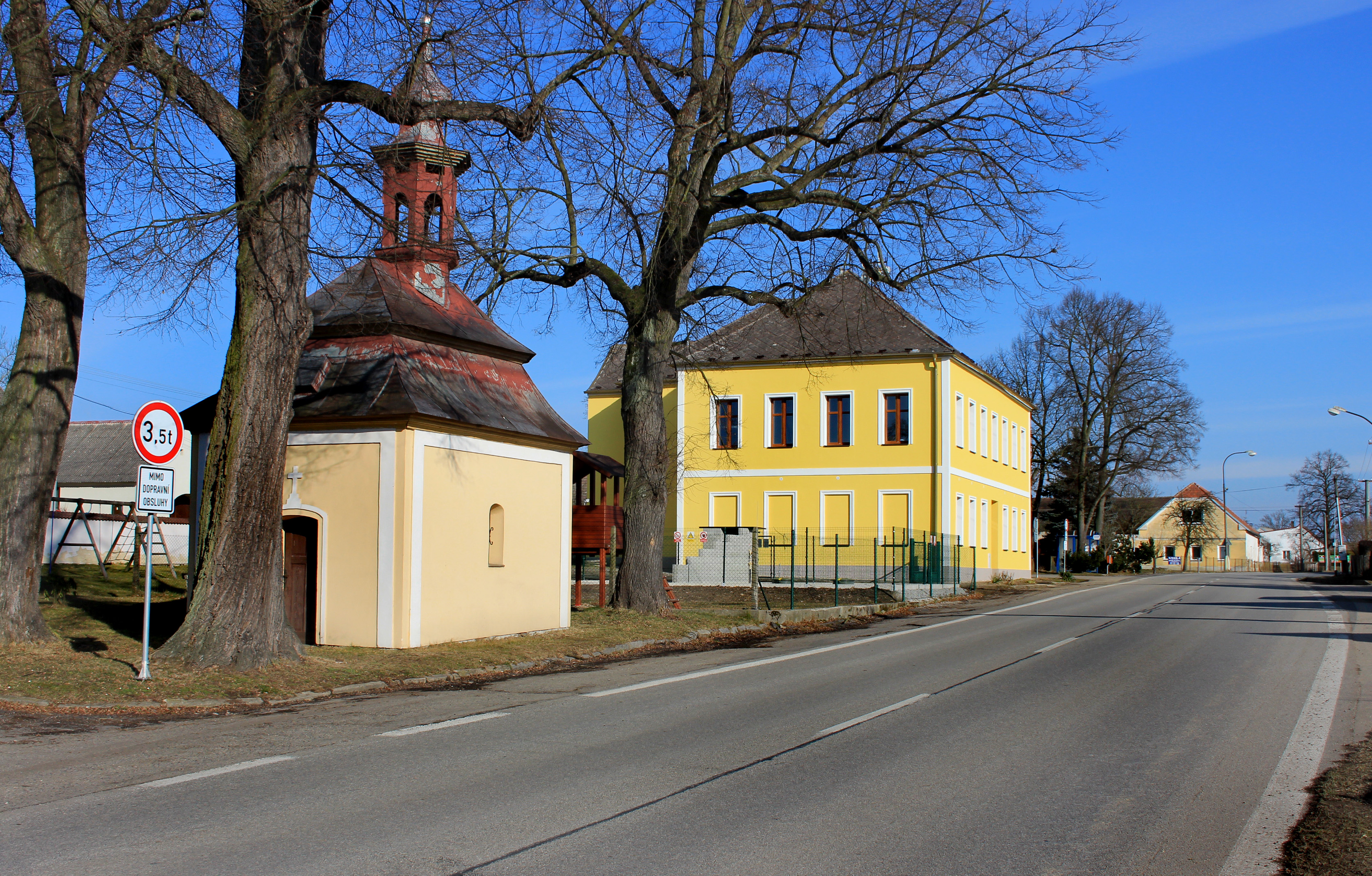
- Main street

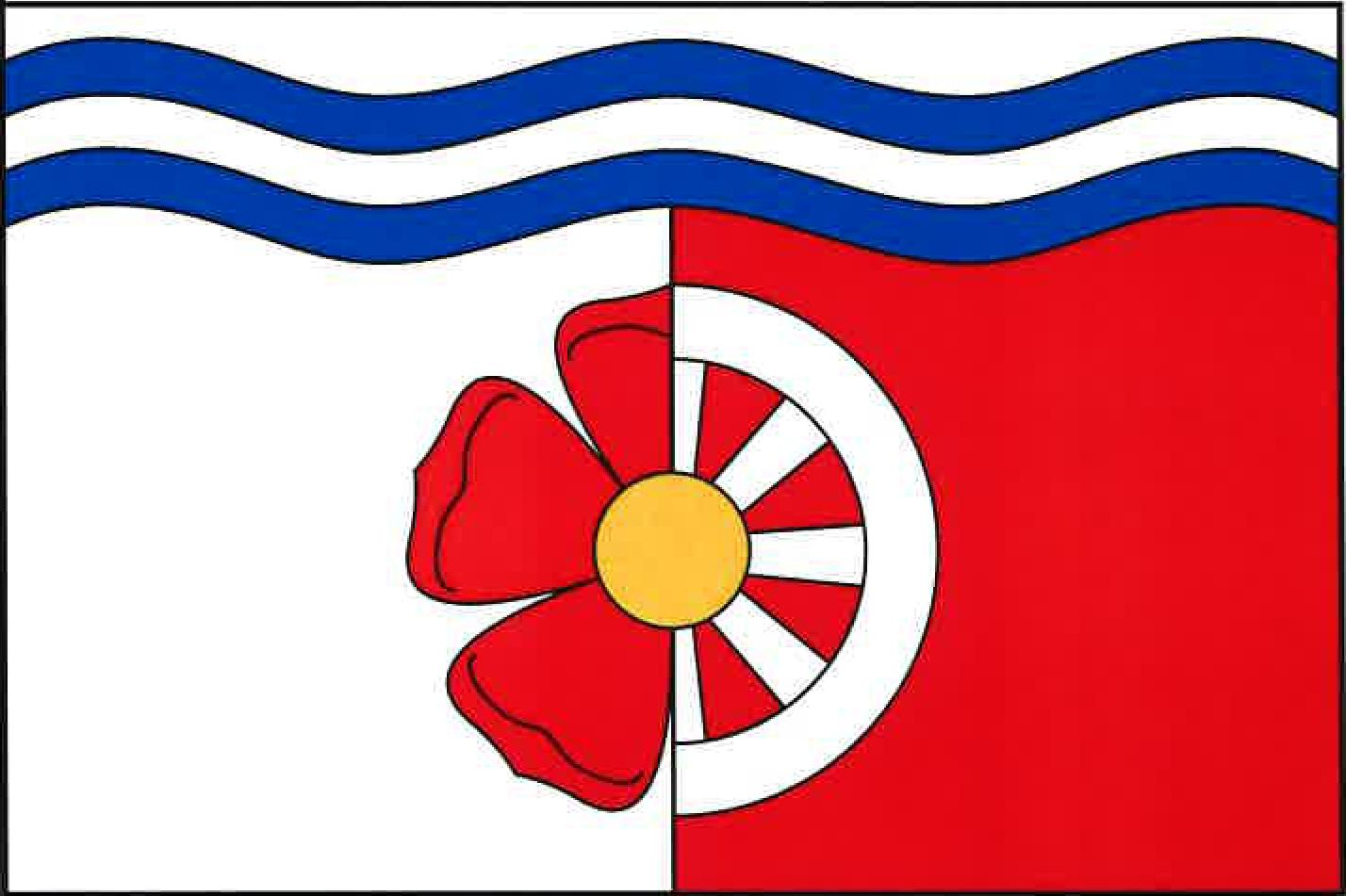
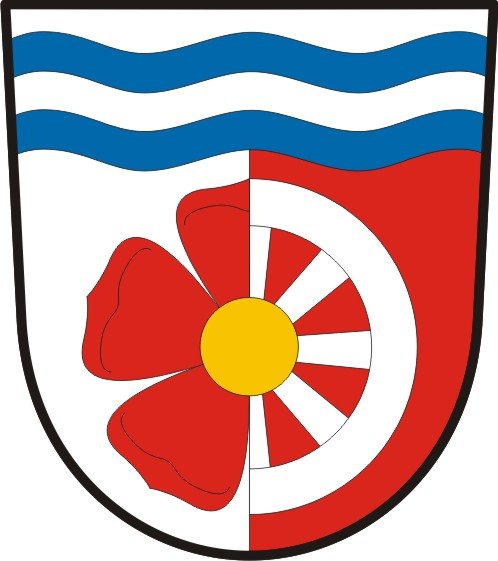
- Flag Coat of arms

- Location in the Czech Republic
- Coordinates: 49°12′47″N 14°46′34″E
- Country: Czech Republic
- Region: South Bohemian
- District: Jindřichův Hradec
- First mentioned: 1402

Area
  - Total: 5.13 km^{2} (1.98 sq mi)
- Elevation: 441 m (1,447 ft)

Population (2026-01-01)
  - Total: 75
  - Density: 15/km^{2} (38/sq mi)
- Time zone: UTC+1 (CET)
  - Summer (DST): UTC+2 (CEST)
- Postal code: 378 23
- Website: www.donov.cz

Doňov is a municipality and village in Jindřichův Hradec District in the South Bohemian Region of the Czech Republic. It has about 80 inhabitants.

== Demographics ==
Historical population
Year	Pop.	±%
1869	239	—
1880	251	+5.0%
1890	245	−2.4%
1900	210	−14.3%
1910	210	+0.0%
1921	208	−1.0%
1930	192	−7.7%
1950	140	−27.1%
1961	138	−1.4%
1970	125	−9.4%
1980	104	−16.8%
1991	86	−17.3%
2001	90	+4.7%
2011	79	−12.2%
2021	85	+7.6%
Source: Censuses
