= Vydří =

- Municipality
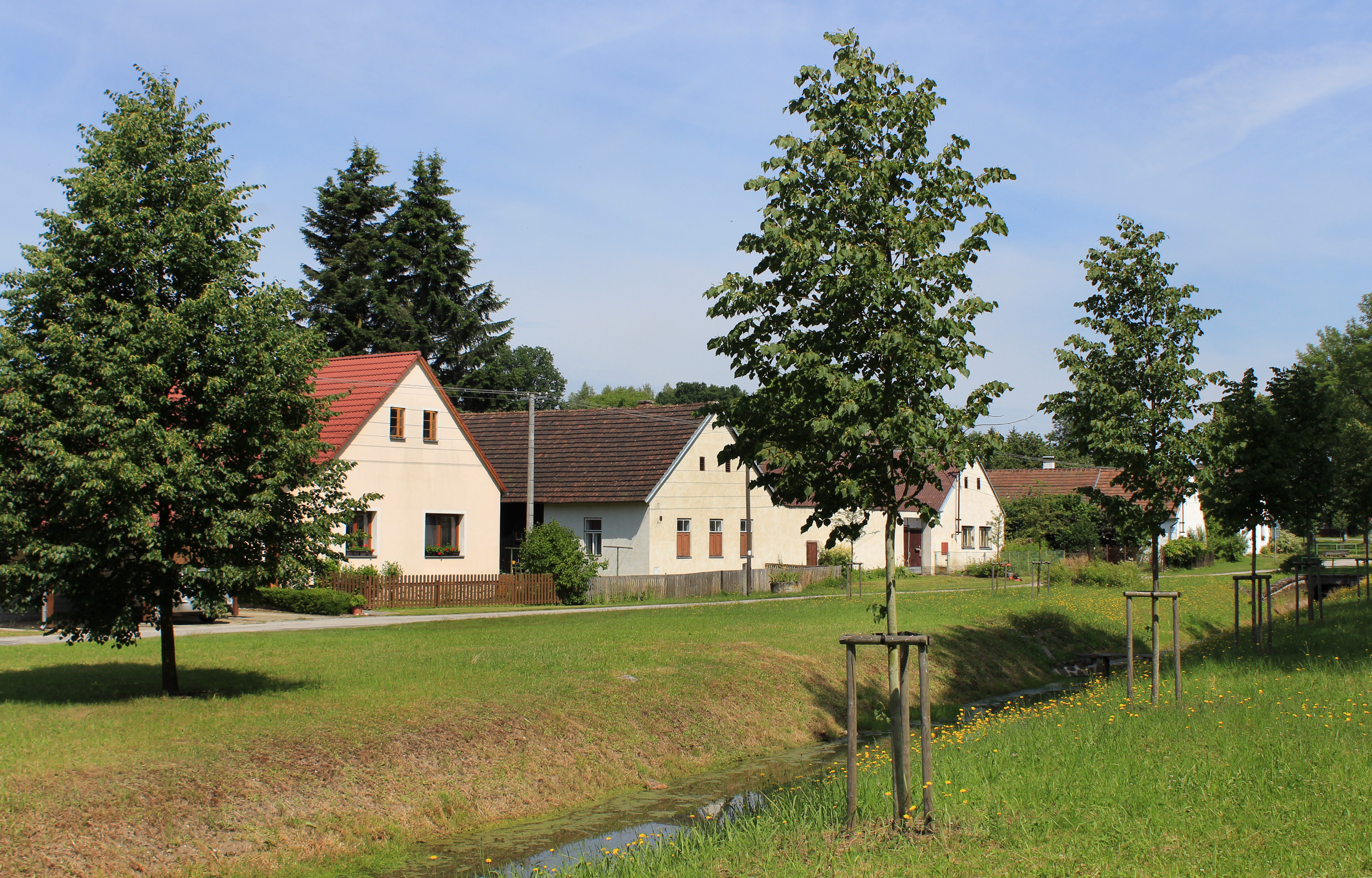
- Centre of Vydří

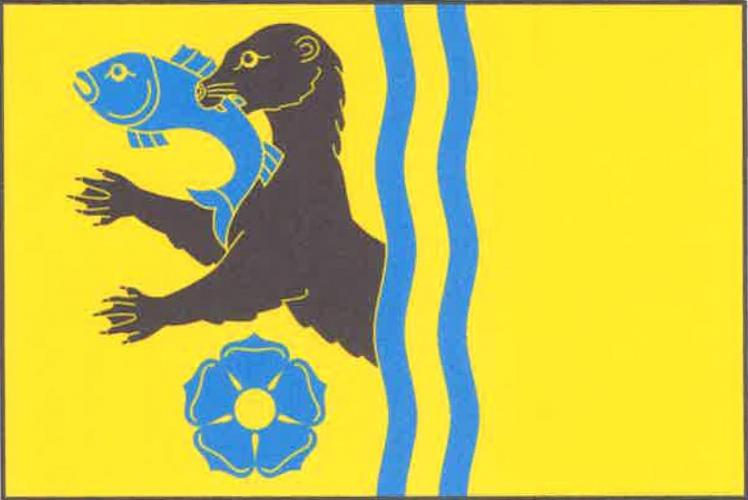
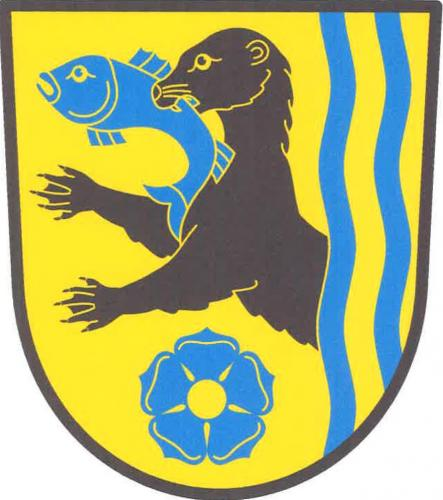
- Flag Coat of arms

- Location in the Czech Republic
- Coordinates: 49°5′33″N 14°56′44″E
- Country: Czech Republic
- Region: South Bohemian
- District: Jindřichův Hradec
- First mentioned: 1364

Area
  - Total: 5.87 km^{2} (2.27 sq mi)
- Elevation: 483 m (1,585 ft)

Population (2026-01-01)
  - Total: 118
  - Density: 20.1/km^{2} (52.1/sq mi)
- Time zone: UTC+1 (CET)
  - Summer (DST): UTC+2 (CEST)
- Postal code: 378 02
- Website: www.vydri.cz

Vydří is a municipality and village in Jindřichův Hradec District in the South Bohemian Region of the Czech Republic. It has about 100 inhabitants.

Vydří lies approximately 8 kilometres (5 mi) south-west of Jindřichův Hradec, 38 km (24 mi) east of České Budějovice, and 117 km (73 mi) south of Prague.

== Etymology ==
The name is derived from the Czech adjective vydří (from vydra = 'otter').

== Demographics ==
Historical population
Year	Pop.	±%
1869	485	—
1880	465	−4.1%
1890	501	+7.7%
1900	496	−1.0%
1910	437	−11.9%
1921	432	−1.1%
1930	401	−7.2%
1950	278	−30.7%
1961	263	−5.4%
1970	212	−19.4%
1980	180	−15.1%
1991	119	−33.9%
2001	106	−10.9%
2011	127	+19.8%
2021	121	−4.7%
Source: Censuses
