= Okrouhlá Radouň =

- Municipality
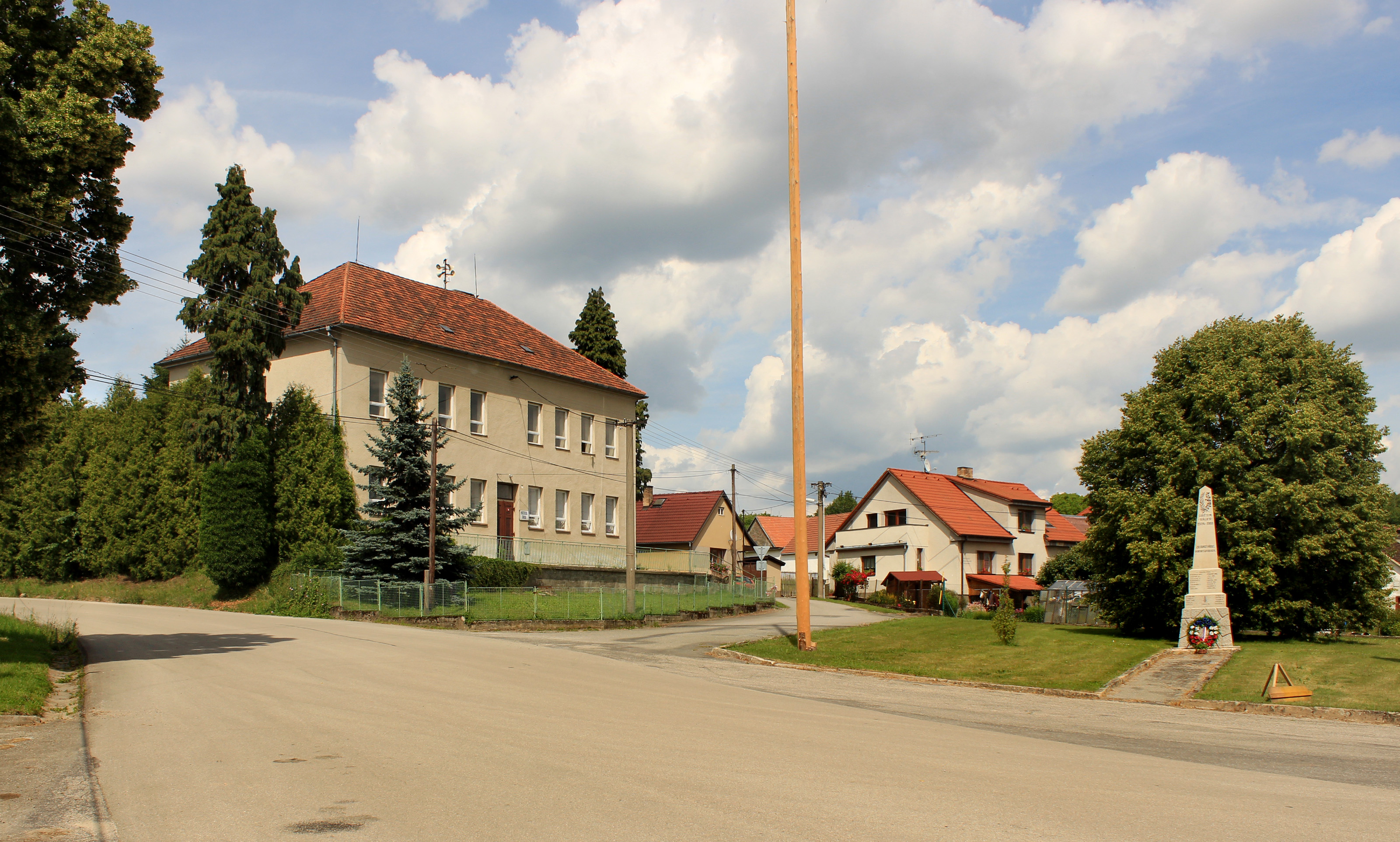
- Centre of Okrouhlá Radouň

- Flag Coat of arms

- Location in the Czech Republic
- Coordinates: 49°14′23″N 15°1′2″E
- Country: Czech Republic
- Region: South Bohemian
- District: Jindřichův Hradec
- First mentioned: 1389

Area
  - Total: 9.08 km^{2} (3.51 sq mi)
- Elevation: 625 m (2,051 ft)

Population (2026-01-01)
  - Total: 221
  - Density: 24.3/km^{2} (63.0/sq mi)
- Time zone: UTC+1 (CET)
  - Summer (DST): UTC+2 (CEST)
- Postal code: 378 42
- Website: www.okrouhlaradoun.cz

Okrouhlá Radouň is a municipality and village in Jindřichův Hradec District in the South Bohemian Region of the Czech Republic. It has about 200 inhabitants.

Okrouhlá Radouň lies approximately 11 kilometres (7 mi) north of Jindřichův Hradec, 50 km (31 mi) north-east of České Budějovice, and 104 km (65 mi) south-east of Prague.

== Demographics ==
Historical population
Year	Pop.	±%
1869	492	—
1880	490	−0.4%
1890	530	+8.2%
1900	552	+4.2%
1910	542	−1.8%
1921	510	−5.9%
1930	474	−7.1%
1950	332	−30.0%
1961	311	−6.3%
1970	246	−20.9%
1980	206	−16.3%
1991	185	−10.2%
2001	165	−10.8%
2011	190	+15.2%
2021	214	+12.6%
Source: Censuses
