= Horní Skrýchov =

- Municipality
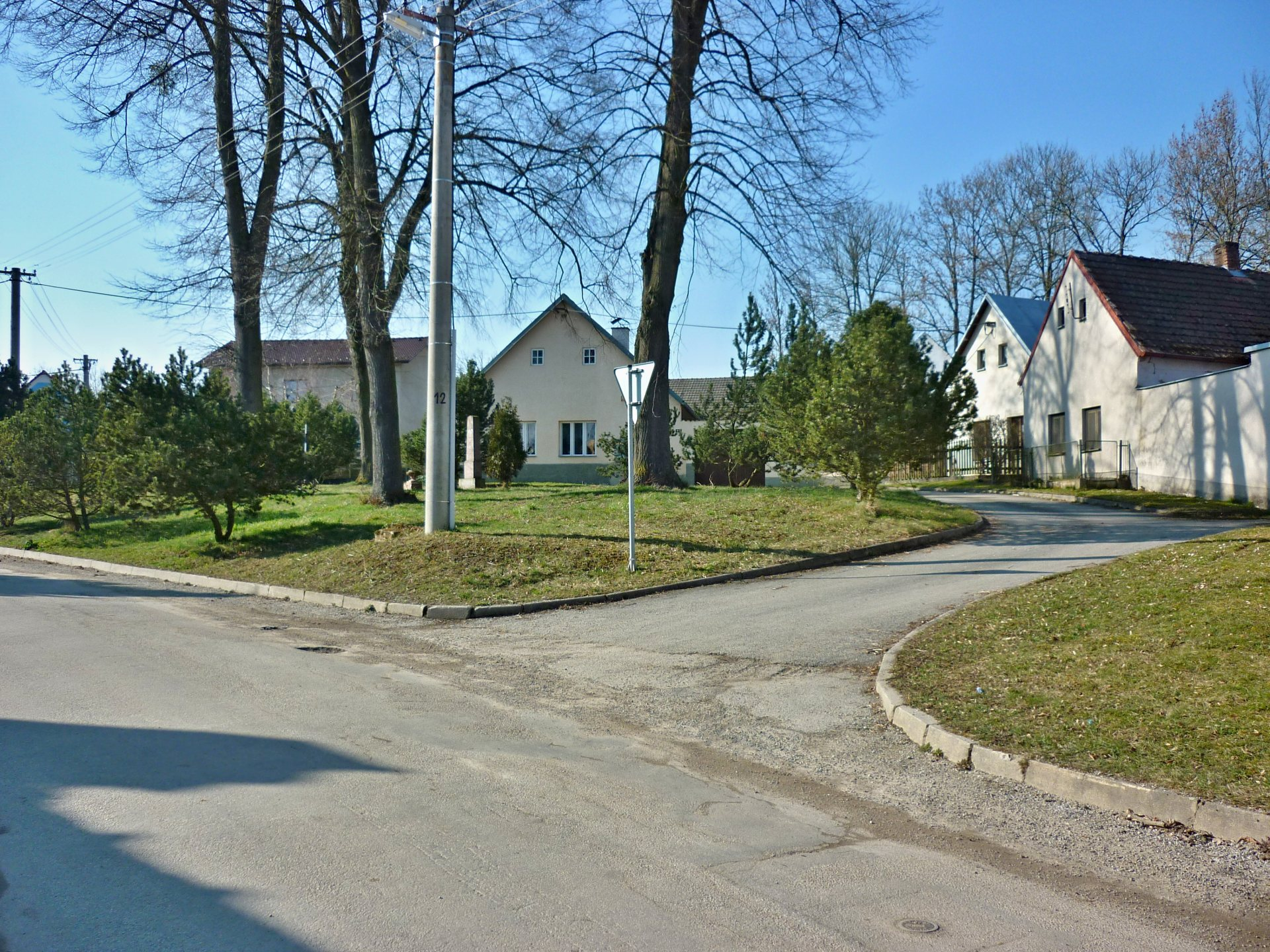
- Centre of Horní Skrýchov

- Location in the Czech Republic
- Coordinates: 49°10′22″N 15°1′42″E
- Country: Czech Republic
- Region: South Bohemian
- District: Jindřichův Hradec
- First mentioned: 1384

Area
  - Total: 3.63 km^{2} (1.40 sq mi)
- Elevation: 484 m (1,588 ft)

Population (2026-01-01)
  - Total: 261
  - Density: 71.9/km^{2} (186/sq mi)
- Time zone: UTC+1 (CET)
  - Summer (DST): UTC+2 (CEST)
- Postal code: 377 01
- Website: horniskrychov.cz

Horní Skrýchov is a municipality and village in Jindřichův Hradec District in the South Bohemian Region of the Czech Republic. It has about 300 inhabitants.

== Demographics ==
Historical population
Year	Pop.	±%
1869	150	—
1880	143	−4.7%
1890	132	−7.7%
1900	121	−8.3%
1910	127	+5.0%
1921	141	+11.0%
1930	150	+6.4%
1950	104	−30.7%
1961	79	−24.0%
1970	89	+12.7%
1980	82	−7.9%
1991	77	−6.1%
2001	84	+9.1%
2011	129	+53.6%
2021	208	+61.2%
Source: Censuses
