= Dunajovice =

Municipality in the Czech Republic

- Municipality
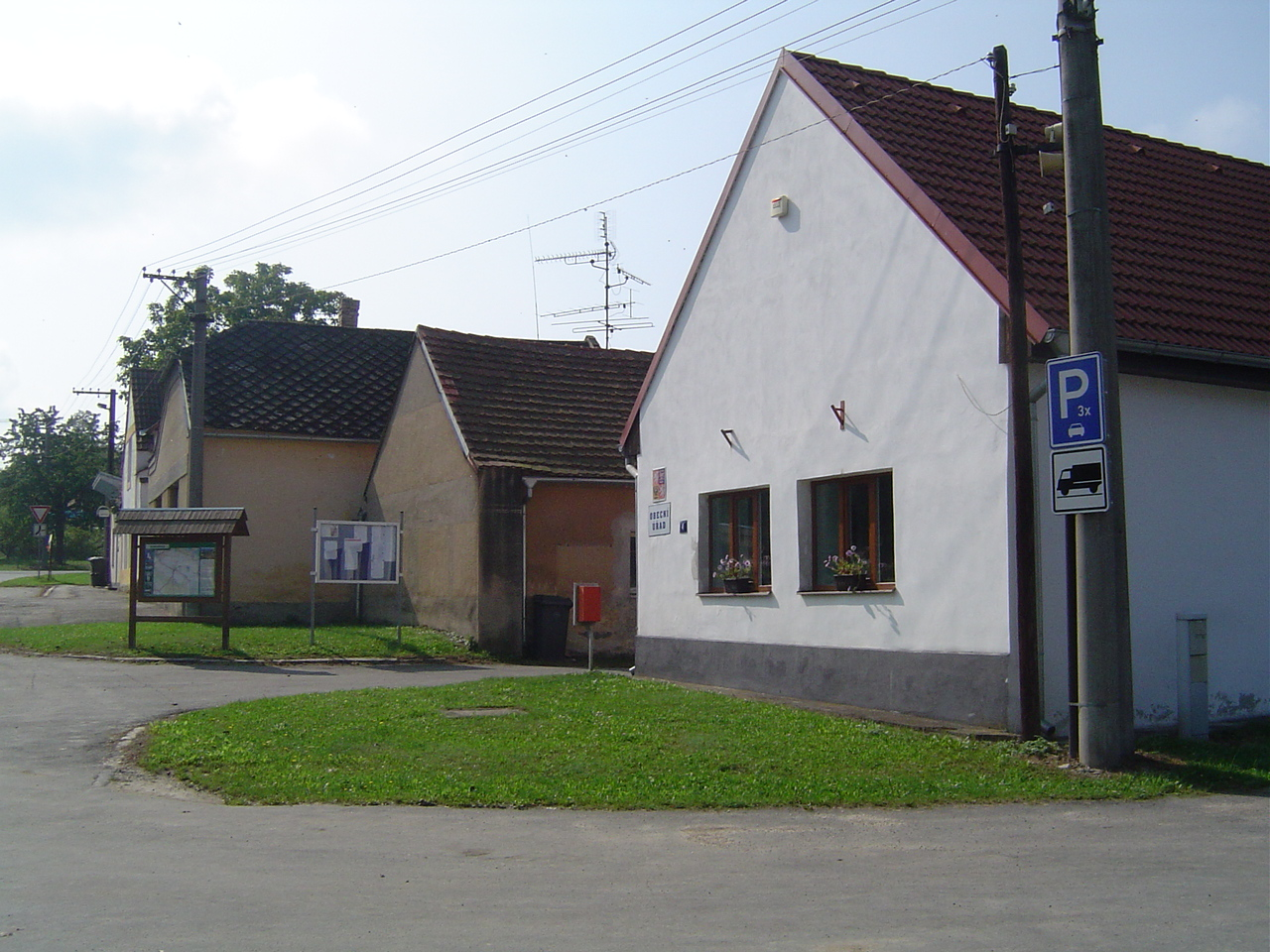
- Municipal office

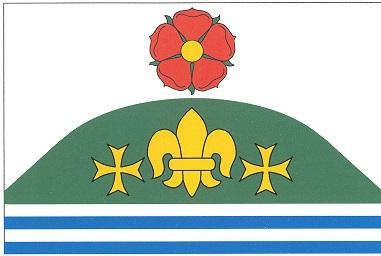
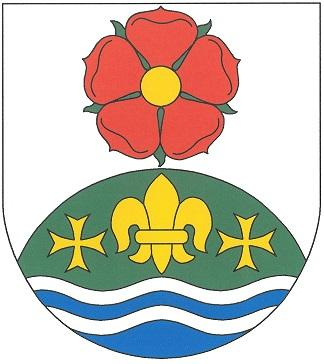
- Flag Coat of arms

- Location in the Czech Republic
- Coordinates: 49°2′6″N 14°41′43″E
- Country: Czech Republic
- Region: South Bohemian
- District: Jindřichův Hradec
- First mentioned: 1376

Area
  - Total: 8.18 km^{2} (3.16 sq mi)
- Elevation: 458 m (1,503 ft)

Population (2026-01-01)
  - Total: 225
  - Density: 27.5/km^{2} (71.2/sq mi)
- Time zone: UTC+1 (CET)
  - Summer (DST): UTC+2 (CEST)
- Postal code: 379 01
- Website: www.obecdunajovice.cz

Dunajovice is a municipality and village in Jindřichův Hradec District in the South Bohemian Region of the Czech Republic. It has about 200 inhabitants.

== Demographics ==
Historical population
Year	Pop.	±%
1869	387	—
1880	395	+2.1%
1890	392	−0.8%
1900	408	+4.1%
1910	409	+0.2%
1921	435	+6.4%
1930	385	−11.5%
1950	266	−30.9%
1961	252	−5.3%
1970	227	−9.9%
1980	172	−24.2%
1991	206	+19.8%
2001	187	−9.2%
2011	203	+8.6%
2021	218	+7.4%
Source: Censuses
