= Ponědrážka =

- Municipality
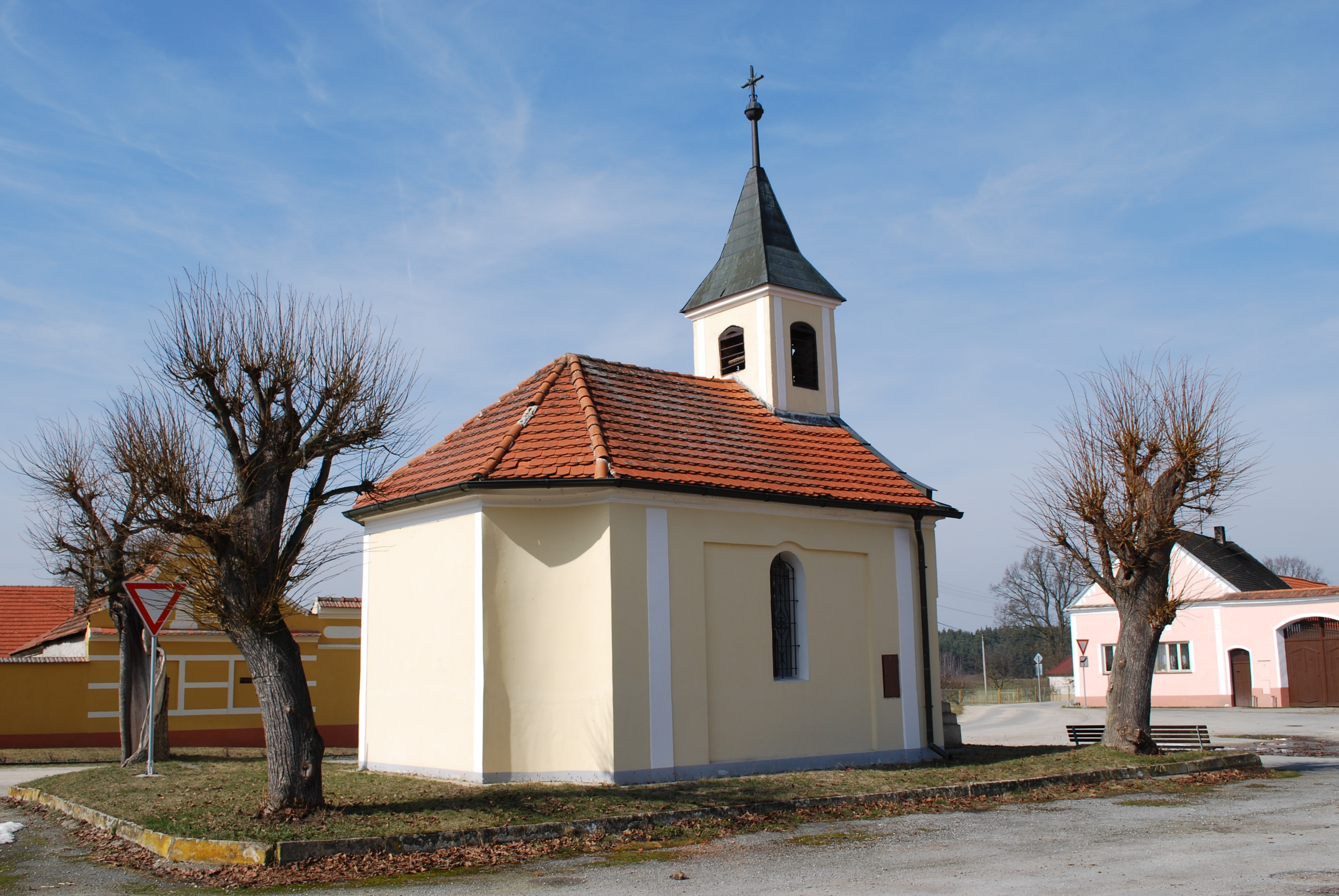
- Chapel in the centre of Ponědrážka

- Location in the Czech Republic
- Coordinates: 49°8′12″N 14°42′12″E
- Country: Czech Republic
- Region: South Bohemian
- District: Jindřichův Hradec
- First mentioned: 1379

Area
  - Total: 6.37 km^{2} (2.46 sq mi)
- Elevation: 423 m (1,388 ft)

Population (2026-01-01)
  - Total: 79
  - Density: 12/km^{2} (32/sq mi)
- Time zone: UTC+1 (CET)
  - Summer (DST): UTC+2 (CEST)
- Postal code: 378 16
- Website: ponedrazka.cz

Ponědrážka is a municipality and village in Jindřichův Hradec District in the South Bohemian Region of the Czech Republic. It has about 80 inhabitants.

Ponědrážka lies approximately 22 kilometres (14 mi) west of Jindřichův Hradec, 25 km (16 mi) north-east of České Budějovice, and 108 km (67 mi) south of Prague.

== Demographics ==
Historical population
Year	Pop.	±%
1869	304	—
1880	252	−17.1%
1890	250	−0.8%
1900	279	+11.6%
1910	243	−12.9%
1921	259	+6.6%
1930	270	+4.2%
1950	217	−19.6%
1961	223	+2.8%
1970	199	−10.8%
1980	161	−19.1%
1991	112	−30.4%
2001	92	−17.9%
2011	78	−15.2%
2021	83	+6.4%
Source: Censuses
