= Ponědraž =

- Municipality
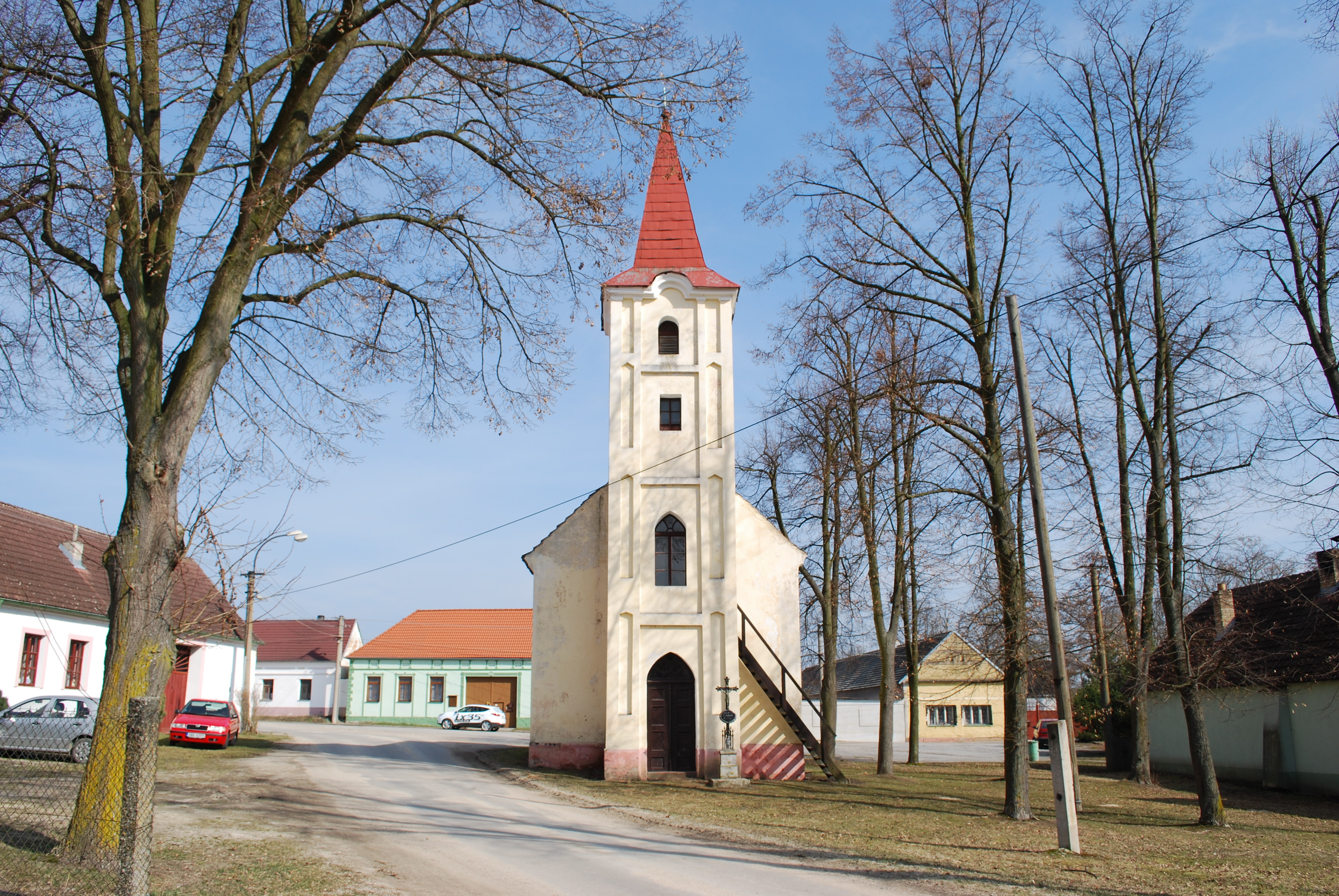
- Chapel in the centre of Ponědraž

- Location in the Czech Republic
- Coordinates: 49°6′58″N 14°42′7″E
- Country: Czech Republic
- Region: South Bohemian
- District: Jindřichův Hradec
- First mentioned: 1259

Area
  - Total: 5.80 km^{2} (2.24 sq mi)
- Elevation: 425 m (1,394 ft)

Population (2026-01-01)
  - Total: 124
  - Density: 21.4/km^{2} (55.4/sq mi)
- Time zone: UTC+1 (CET)
  - Summer (DST): UTC+2 (CEST)
- Postal code: 378 16
- Website: ponedraz.cz

Ponědraž is a municipality and village in Jindřichův Hradec District in the South Bohemian Region of the Czech Republic. It has about 100 inhabitants.

Ponědraž lies approximately 22 kilometres (14 mi) west of Jindřichův Hradec, 24 km (15 mi) north-east of České Budějovice, and 110 km (68 mi) south of Prague.

== Demographics ==
Historical population
Year	Pop.	±%
1869	330	—
1880	319	−3.3%
1890	330	+3.4%
1900	262	−20.6%
1910	261	−0.4%
1921	259	−0.8%
1930	247	−4.6%
1950	167	−32.4%
1961	158	−5.4%
1970	142	−10.1%
1980	144	+1.4%
1991	123	−14.6%
2001	122	−0.8%
2011	108	−11.5%
2021	109	+0.9%
Source: Censuses
