= Horní Radouň =

- Municipality
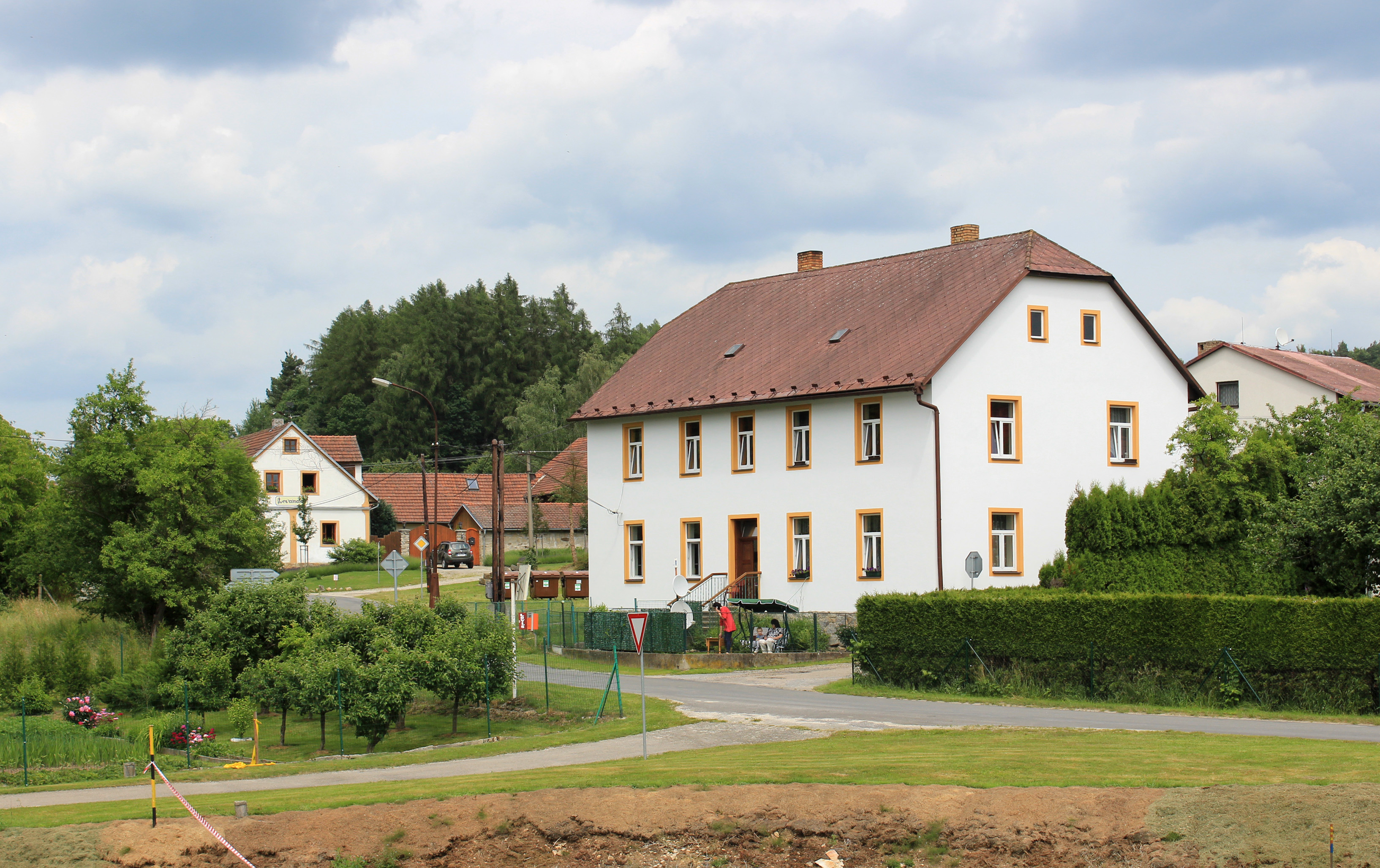
- Centre of Horní Radouň

- Flag Coat of arms

- Location in the Czech Republic
- Coordinates: 49°15′26″N 15°0′21″E
- Country: Czech Republic
- Region: South Bohemian
- District: Jindřichův Hradec
- First mentioned: 1437

Area
  - Total: 15.36 km^{2} (5.93 sq mi)
- Elevation: 558 m (1,831 ft)

Population (2026-01-01)
  - Total: 269
  - Density: 17.5/km^{2} (45.4/sq mi)
- Time zone: UTC+1 (CET)
  - Summer (DST): UTC+2 (CEST)
- Postal codes: 378 42, 378 43
- Website: www.horniradoun.cz

Horní Radouň is a municipality and village in Jindřichův Hradec District in the South Bohemian Region of the Czech Republic. It has about 300 inhabitants.

Horní Radouň lies approximately 13 kilometres (8 mi) north of Jindřichův Hradec, 50 km (31 mi) north-east of České Budějovice, and 101 km (63 mi) south-east of Prague.

== Administrative division ==
Horní Radouň consists of four municipal parts (in brackets population according to the 2021 census):

- Horní Radouň (184)
- Bukovka (3)
- Nový Bozděchov (15)
- Starý Bozděchov (50)

== Demographics ==
Historical population
| Year | Pop. | ±% |
|---|---|---|
| 1869 | 1,245 | — |
| 1880 | 1,193 | −4.2% |
| 1890 | 1,175 | −1.5% |
| 1900 | 1,123 | −4.4% |
| 1910 | 1,093 | −2.7% |
| 1921 | 1,018 | −6.9% |
| 1930 | 873 | −14.2% |
| 1950 | 592 | −32.2% |
| 1961 | 580 | −2.0% |
| 1970 | 474 | −18.3% |
| 1980 | 401 | −15.4% |
| 1991 | 298 | −25.7% |
| 2001 | 256 | −14.1% |
| 2011 | 244 | −4.7% |
| 2021 | 252 | +3.3% |
Source: Censuses
