= Hříšice =

- Municipality
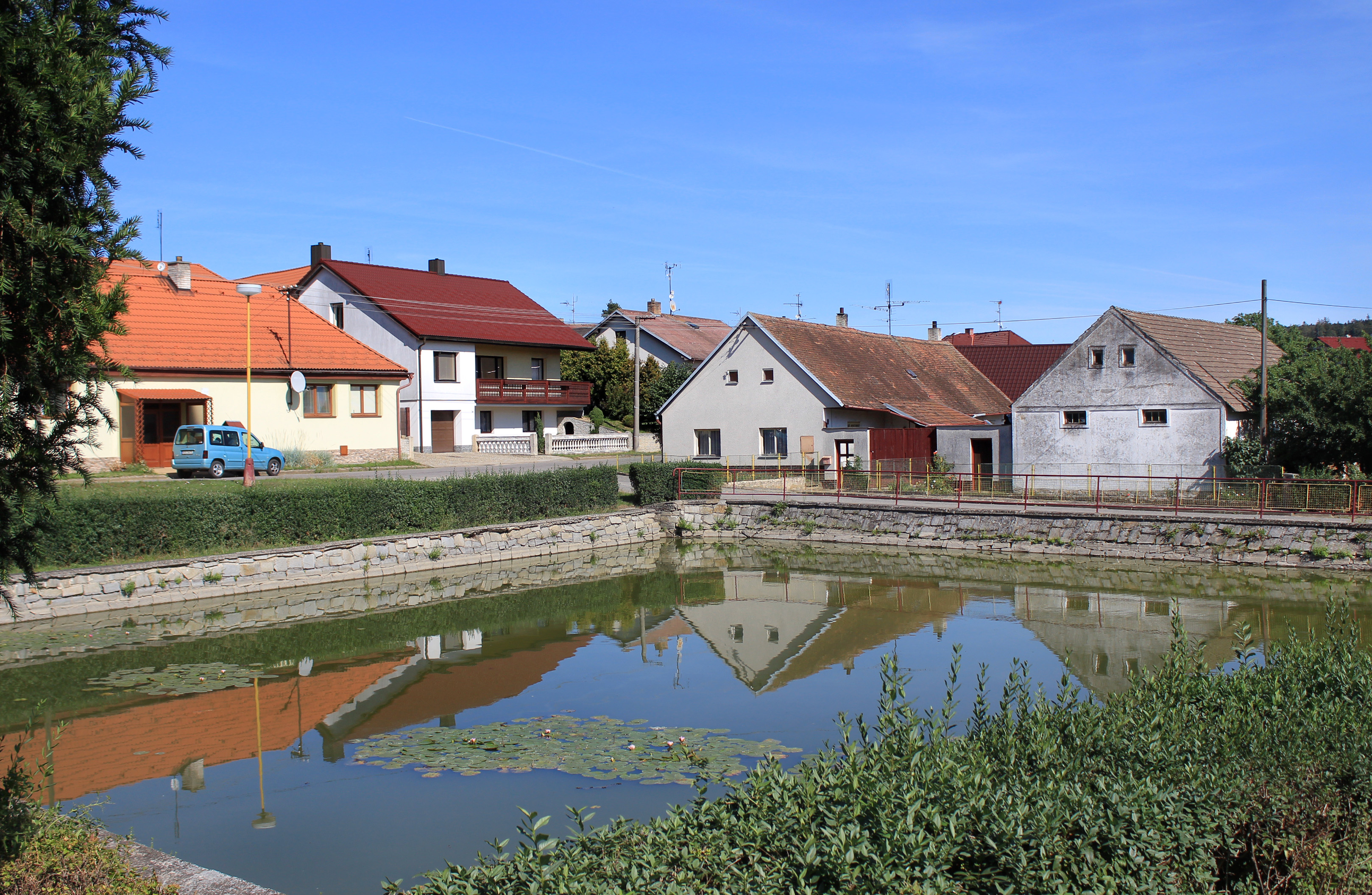
- Centre of Hříšice

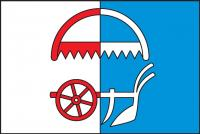
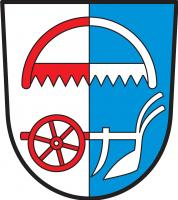
- Flag Coat of arms

- Location in the Czech Republic
- Coordinates: 49°6′12″N 15°29′44″E
- Country: Czech Republic
- Region: South Bohemian
- District: Jindřichův Hradec
- First mentioned: 1353

Area
  - Total: 11.64 km^{2} (4.49 sq mi)
- Elevation: 524 m (1,719 ft)

Population (2026-01-01)
  - Total: 327
  - Density: 28.1/km^{2} (72.8/sq mi)
- Time zone: UTC+1 (CET)
  - Summer (DST): UTC+2 (CEST)
- Postal code: 380 01
- Website: www.hrisice-jersice.cz

Hříšice is a municipality and village in Jindřichův Hradec District in the South Bohemian Region of the Czech Republic. It has about 300 inhabitants.

Hříšice lies approximately 37 kilometres (23 mi) east of Jindřichův Hradec, 76 km (47 mi) east of České Budějovice, and 134 km (83 mi) south-east of Prague.

== Administrative division ==
Hříšice consists of two municipal parts (in brackets population according to the 2021 census):

- Hříšice (290)
- Jersice (40)

== Demographics ==
Historical population
Year	Pop.	±%
1869	442	—
1880	456	+3.2%
1890	436	−4.4%
1900	442	+1.4%
1910	434	−1.8%
1921	447	+3.0%
1930	401	−10.3%
1950	330	−17.7%
1961	343	+3.9%
1970	328	−4.4%
1980	324	−1.2%
1991	307	−5.2%
2001	335	+9.1%
2011	320	−4.5%
2021	330	+3.1%
Source: Censuses
