= Bednáreček =

- Municipality
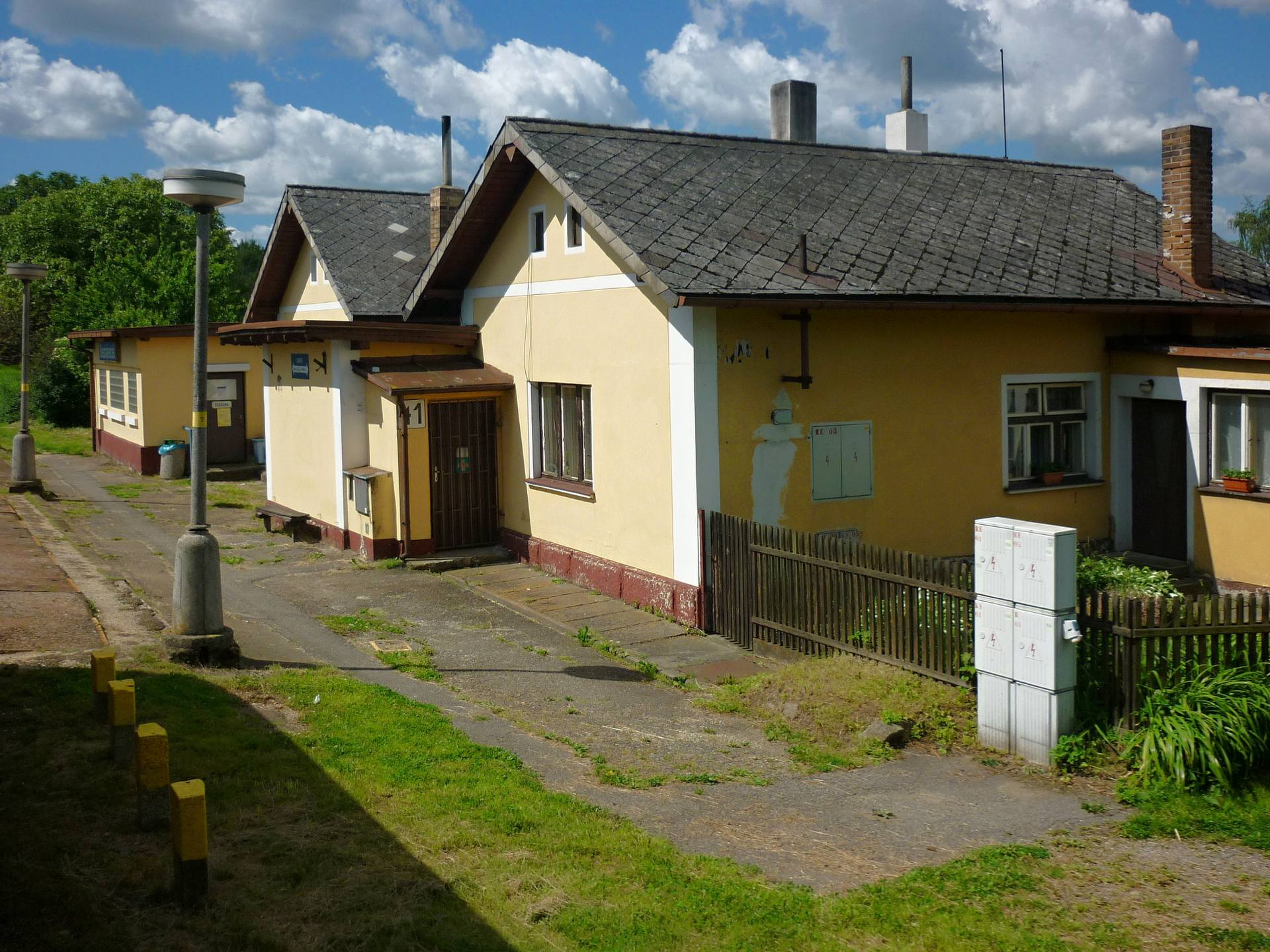
- Train station

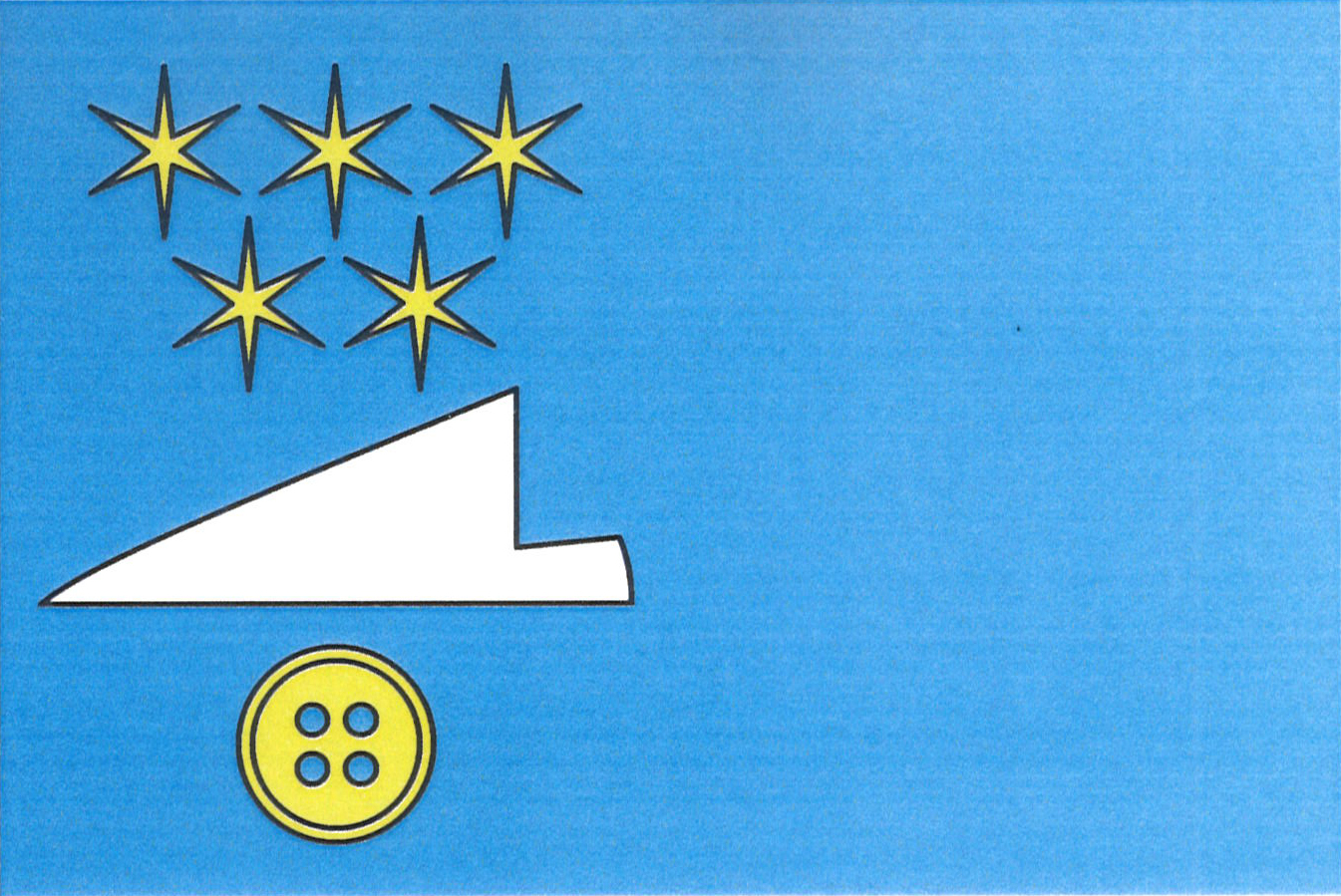
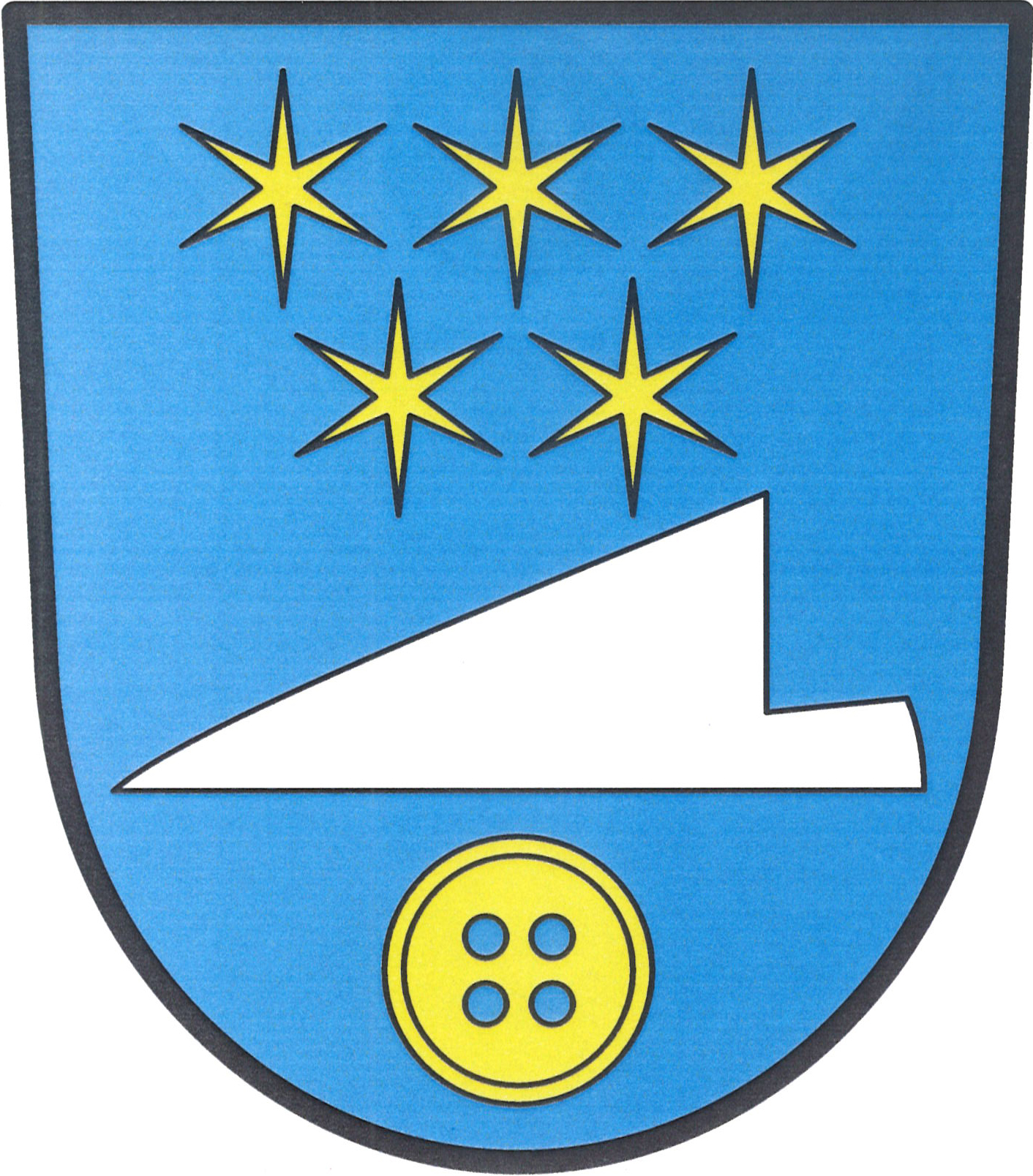
- Flag Coat of arms

- Location in the Czech Republic
- Coordinates: 49°12′36″N 15°8′38″E
- Country: Czech Republic
- Region: South Bohemian
- District: Jindřichův Hradec
- First mentioned: 1499

Area
  - Total: 6.95 km^{2} (2.68 sq mi)
- Elevation: 549 m (1,801 ft)

Population (2026-01-01)
  - Total: 171
  - Density: 24.6/km^{2} (63.7/sq mi)
- Time zone: UTC+1 (CET)
  - Summer (DST): UTC+2 (CEST)
- Postal code: 378 42
- Website: www.bednarecek.cz

Bednáreček (German: Klein Bernharz) is a municipality and village in Jindřichův Hradec District in the South Bohemian Region of the Czech Republic. It has about 200 inhabitants.

== Demographics ==
Historical population
Year	Pop.	±%
1869	362	—
1880	364	+0.6%
1890	374	+2.7%
1900	428	+14.4%
1910	503	+17.5%
1921	507	+0.8%
1930	434	−14.4%
1950	350	−19.4%
1961	332	−5.1%
1970	290	−12.7%
1980	209	−27.9%
1991	183	−12.4%
2001	181	−1.1%
2011	192	+6.1%
2021	182	−5.2%
Source: Censuses
