= Polště =

- Municipality
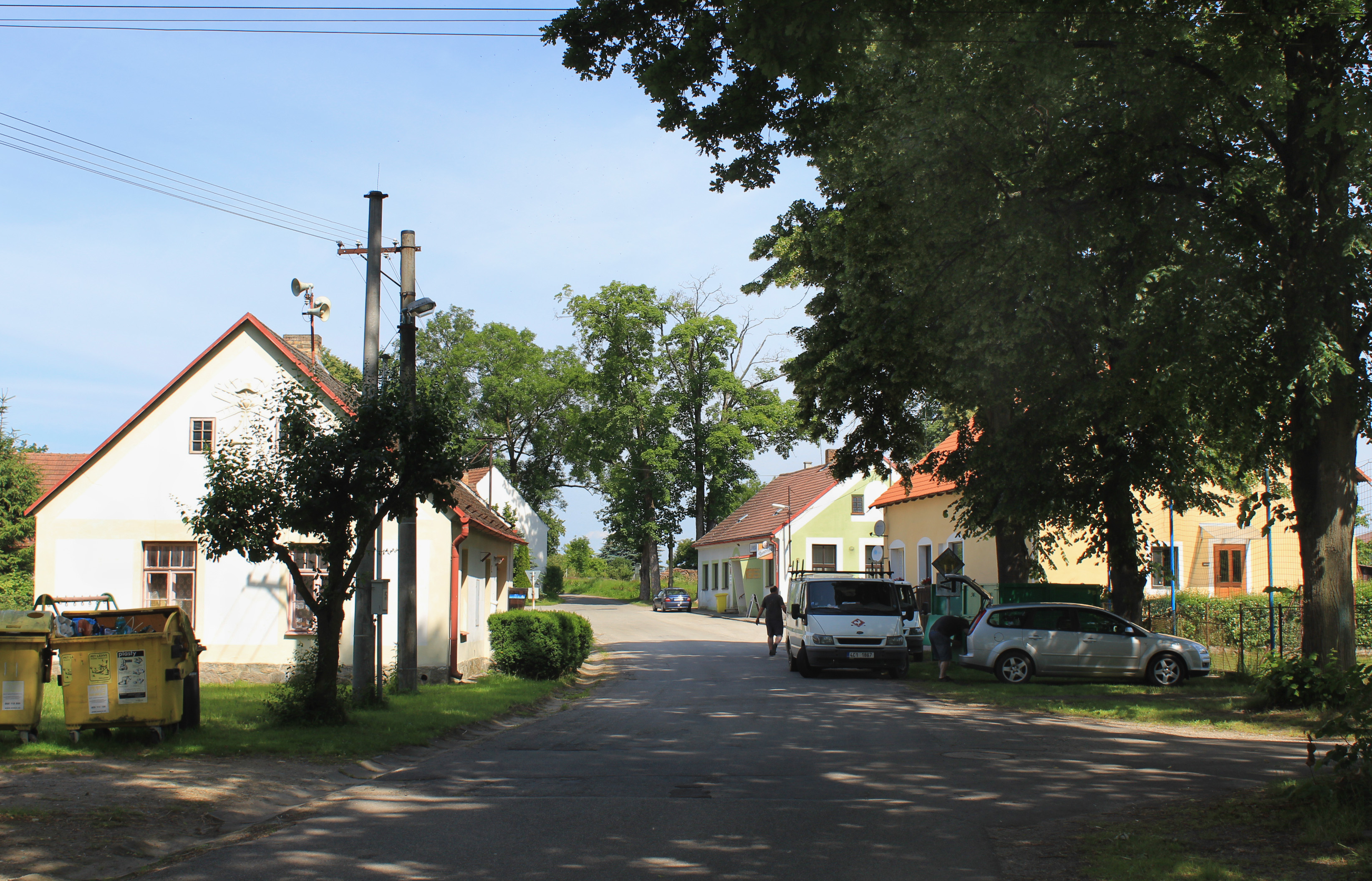
- Main street

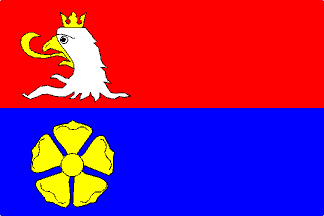
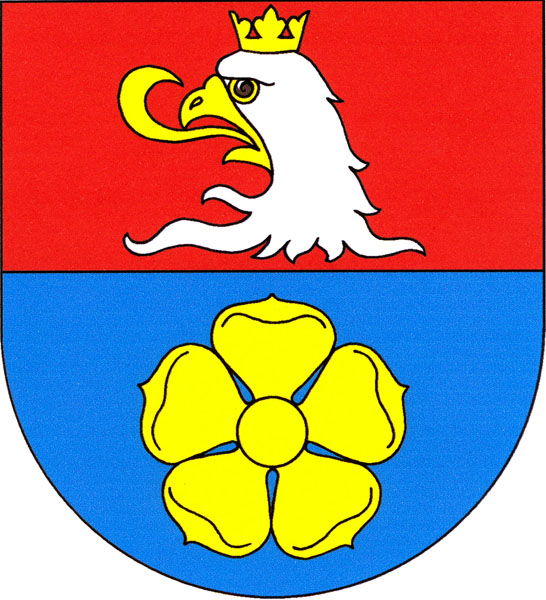
- Flag Coat of arms

- Location in the Czech Republic
- Coordinates: 49°6′23″N 14°55′40″E
- Country: Czech Republic
- Region: South Bohemian
- District: Jindřichův Hradec
- First mentioned: 1389

Area
  - Total: 4.13 km^{2} (1.59 sq mi)
- Elevation: 511 m (1,677 ft)

Population (2026-01-01)
  - Total: 102
  - Density: 24.7/km^{2} (64.0/sq mi)
- Time zone: UTC+1 (CET)
  - Summer (DST): UTC+2 (CEST)
- Postal code: 377 01
- Website: www.polste.cz

Polště is a municipality and village in Jindřichův Hradec District in the South Bohemian Region of the Czech Republic. It has about 100 inhabitants.

Polště lies approximately 7 kilometres (4 mi) south-west of Jindřichův Hradec, 37 km (23 mi) north-east of České Budějovice, and 115 km (71 mi) south of Prague.

== Demographics ==
Historical population
Year	Pop.	±%
1869	380	—
1880	338	−11.1%
1890	337	−0.3%
1900	364	+8.0%
1910	321	−11.8%
1921	302	−5.9%
1930	283	−6.3%
1950	185	−34.6%
1961	162	−12.4%
1970	136	−16.0%
1980	114	−16.2%
1991	84	−26.3%
2001	97	+15.5%
2011	104	+7.2%
2021	114	+9.6%
Source: Censuses
