= Drunče =

- Municipality
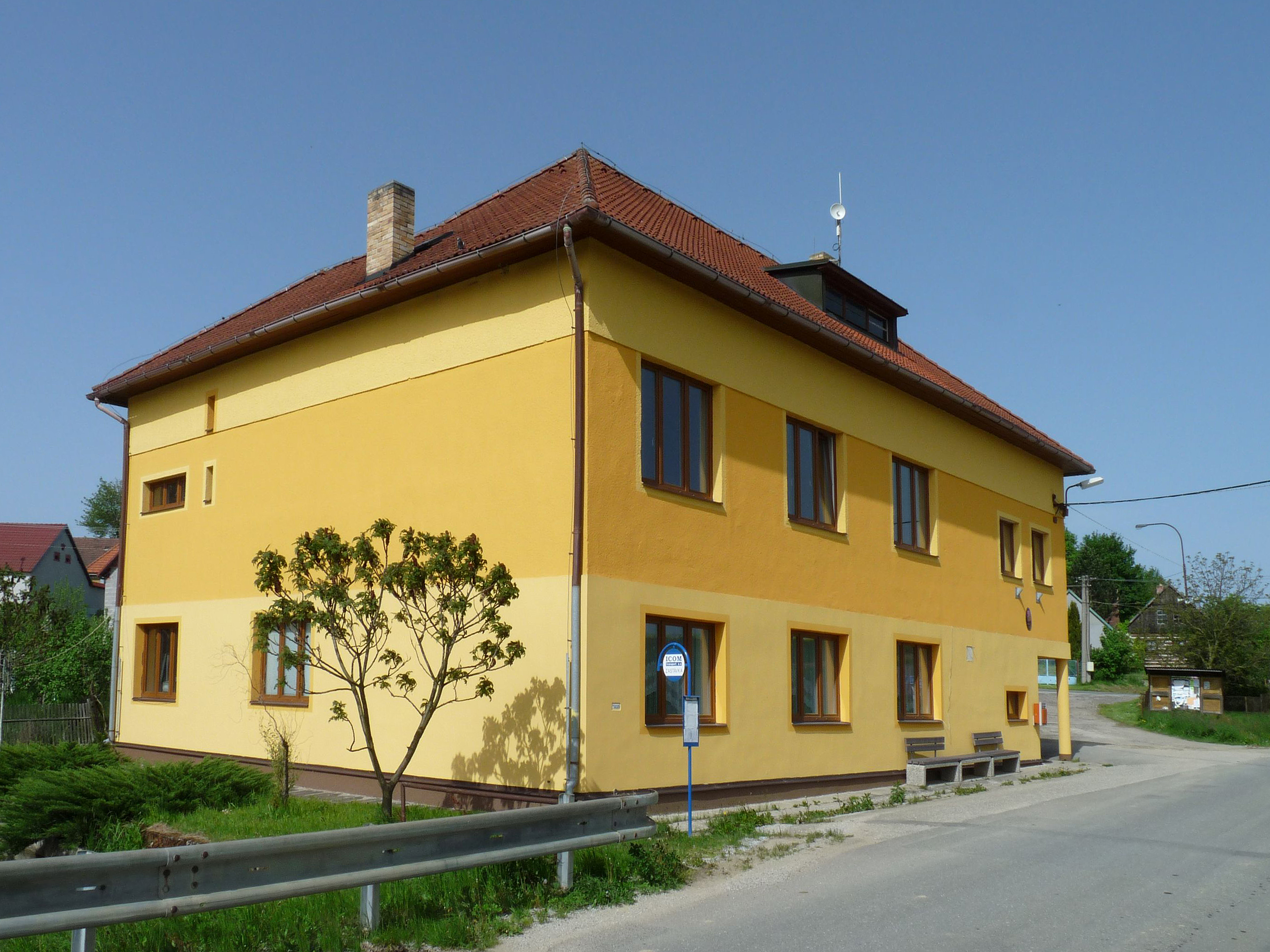
- Municipal office

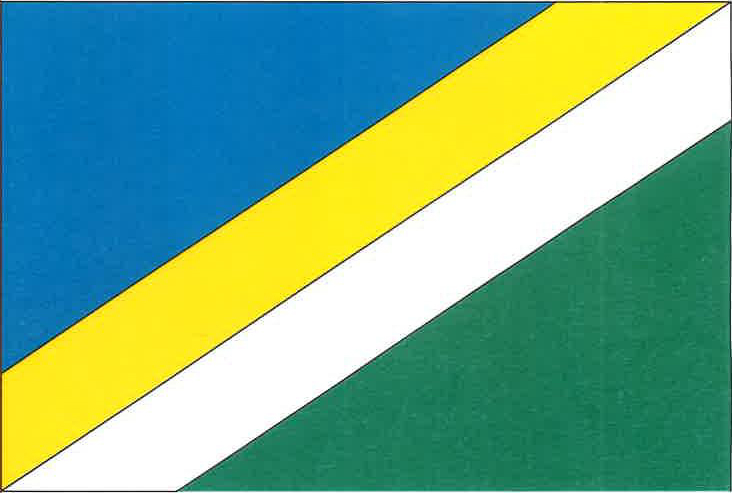
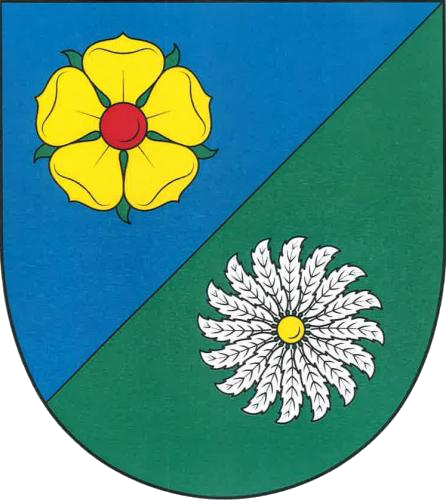
- Flag Coat of arms

- Location in the Czech Republic
- Coordinates: 49°17′49″N 14°56′11″E
- Country: Czech Republic
- Region: South Bohemian
- District: Jindřichův Hradec
- First mentioned: 1267

Area
  - Total: 4.11 km^{2} (1.59 sq mi)
- Elevation: 566 m (1,857 ft)

Population (2026-01-01)
  - Total: 52
  - Density: 13/km^{2} (33/sq mi)
- Time zone: UTC+1 (CET)
  - Summer (DST): UTC+2 (CEST)
- Postal code: 378 21
- Website: www.drunce.cz

Drunče (German: Druntsch) is a municipality and village in Jindřichův Hradec District in the South Bohemian Region of the Czech Republic. It has about 50 inhabitants.

== Administrative division ==
Drunče consists of two municipal parts (in brackets population according to the 2021 census):

- Drunče (41)
- Annovice (10)

== Demographics ==
Historical population
Year	Pop.	±%
1869	195	—
1880	201	+3.1%
1890	187	−7.0%
1900	202	+8.0%
1910	203	+0.5%
1921	188	−7.4%
1930	181	−3.7%
1950	139	−23.2%
1961	150	+7.9%
1970	133	−11.3%
1980	97	−27.1%
1991	67	−30.9%
2001	60	−10.4%
2011	39	−35.0%
2021	51	+30.8%
Source: Censuses
