= Báňovice =

- Municipality
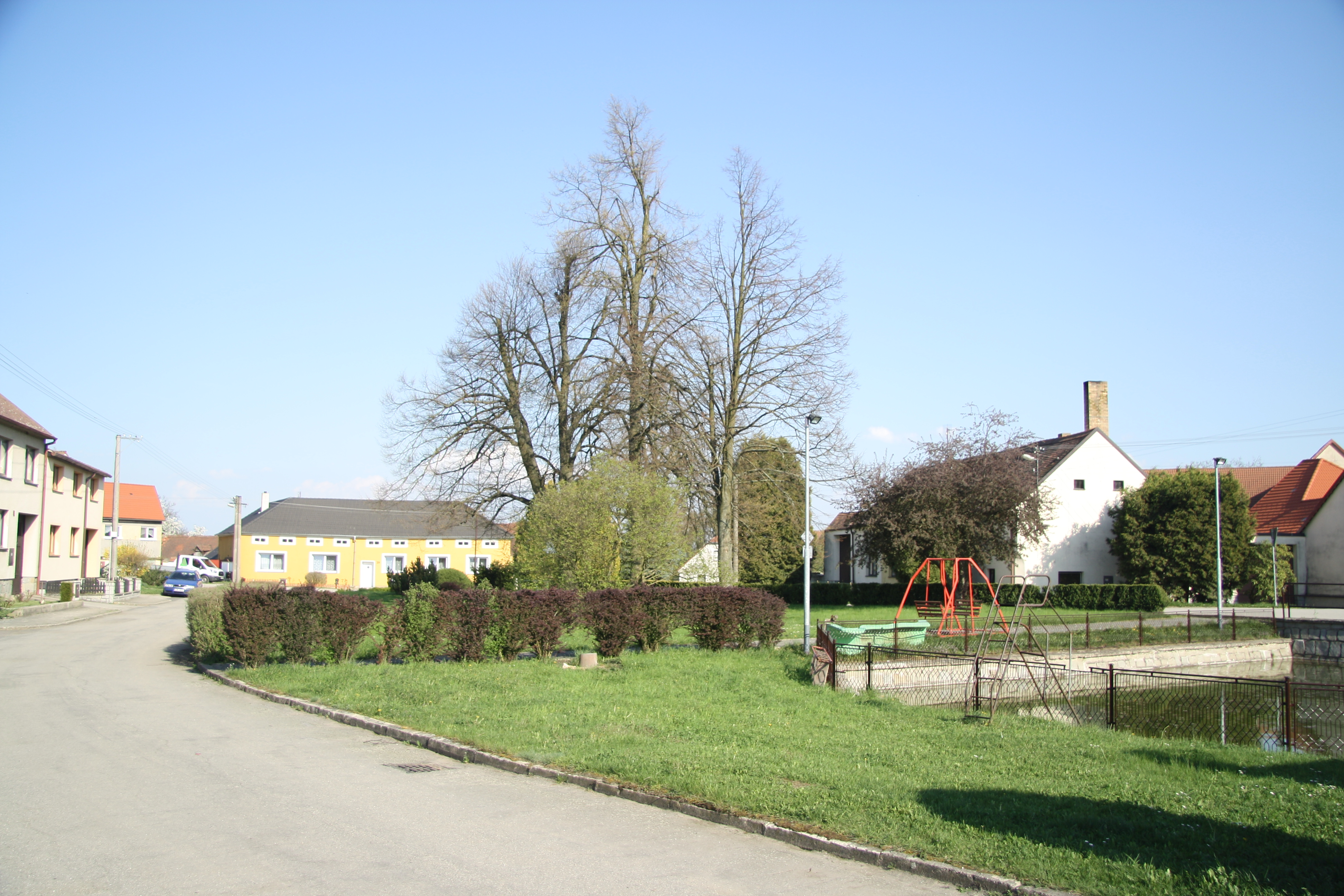
- Centre of Báňovice

- Location in the Czech Republic
- Coordinates: 49°0′43″N 15°29′25″E
- Country: Czech Republic
- Region: South Bohemian
- District: Jindřichův Hradec
- First mentioned: 1327

Area
  - Total: 4.80 km^{2} (1.85 sq mi)
- Elevation: 516 m (1,693 ft)

Population (2026-01-01)
  - Total: 104
  - Density: 21.7/km^{2} (56.1/sq mi)
- Time zone: UTC+1 (CET)
  - Summer (DST): UTC+2 (CEST)
- Postal code: 380 01
- Website: www.banovice.cz

Báňovice (German: Banowitz) is a municipality and village in Jindřichův Hradec District in the South Bohemian Region of the Czech Republic. It has about 100 inhabitants.

== Demographics ==
Historical population
Year	Pop.	±%
1869	178	—
1880	186	+4.5%
1890	185	−0.5%
1900	184	−0.5%
1910	188	+2.2%
1921	170	−9.6%
1930	195	+14.7%
1950	141	−27.7%
1961	142	+0.7%
1970	130	−8.5%
1980	115	−11.5%
1991	112	−2.6%
2001	110	−1.8%
2011	110	+0.0%
2021	108	−1.8%
Source: Censuses
