= Březina (Jindřichův Hradec District) =

- Municipality
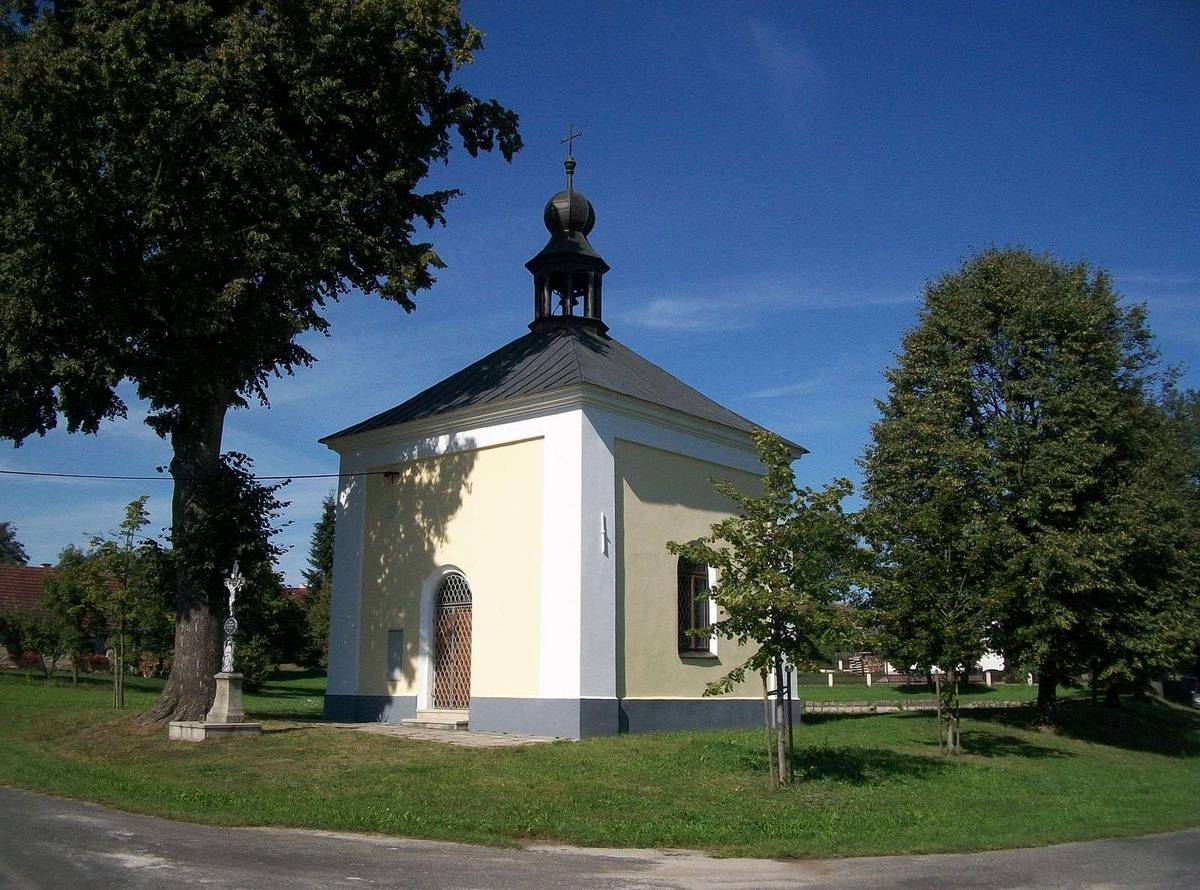
- Chapel of Saint John of Nepomuk

- Location in the Czech Republic
- Coordinates: 49°17′26″N 14°54′35″E
- Country: Czech Republic
- Region: South Bohemian
- District: Jindřichův Hradec
- First mentioned: 1294

Area
  - Total: 9.51 km^{2} (3.67 sq mi)
- Elevation: 560 m (1,840 ft)

Population (2026-01-01)
  - Total: 127
  - Density: 13.4/km^{2} (34.6/sq mi)
- Time zone: UTC+1 (CET)
  - Summer (DST): UTC+2 (CEST)
- Postal code: 378 21
- Website: www.obecbrezina.cz

Březina is a municipality and village in Jindřichův Hradec District in the South Bohemian Region of the Czech Republic. It has about 100 inhabitants.

== Etymology ==
The name means 'birch forest' in Czech. The village was founded on the site of a cleared birch forest.

== Demographics ==
Historical population
| Year | Pop. | ±% |
|---|---|---|
| 1869 | 647 | — |
| 1880 | 637 | −1.5% |
| 1890 | 604 | −5.2% |
| 1900 | 607 | +0.5% |
| 1910 | 623 | +2.6% |
| 1921 | 544 | −12.7% |
| 1930 | 449 | −17.5% |
| 1950 | 353 | −21.4% |
| 1961 | 318 | −9.9% |
| 1970 | 279 | −12.3% |
| 1980 | 232 | −16.8% |
| 1991 | 183 | −21.1% |
| 2001 | 159 | −13.1% |
| 2011 | 135 | −15.1% |
| 2021 | 113 | −16.3% |
Source: Censuses
