= Bořetín (Jindřichův Hradec District) =

- Municipality
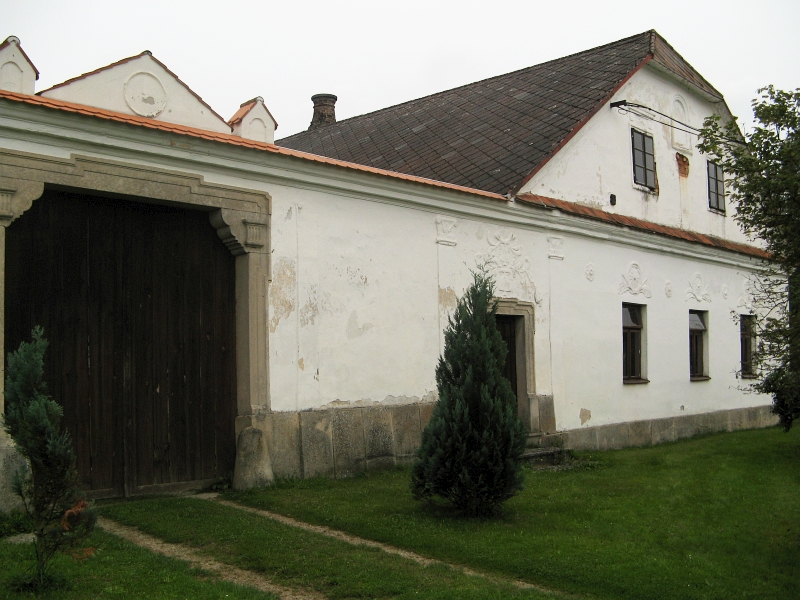
- Homestead No. 1

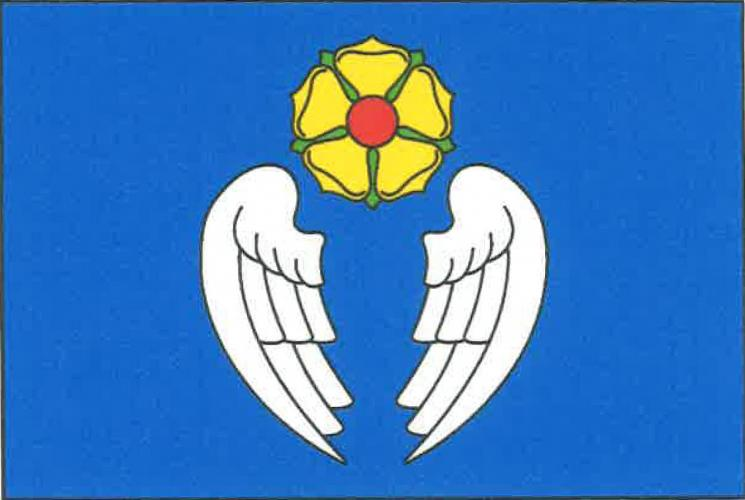
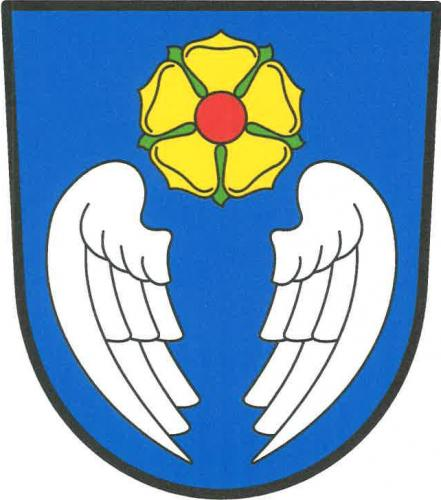
- Flag Coat of arms

- Location in the Czech Republic
- Coordinates: 49°11′21″N 15°12′43″E
- Country: Czech Republic
- Region: South Bohemian
- District: Jindřichův Hradec
- First mentioned: 1404

Area
  - Total: 5.88 km^{2} (2.27 sq mi)
- Elevation: 580 m (1,900 ft)

Population (2026-01-01)
  - Total: 103
  - Density: 17.5/km^{2} (45.4/sq mi)
- Time zone: UTC+1 (CET)
  - Summer (DST): UTC+2 (CEST)
- Postal code: 378 53
- Website: www.obecboretin.cz

Bořetín is a municipality and village in Jindřichův Hradec District in the South Bohemian Region of the Czech Republic. It has about 100 inhabitants.

== Demographics ==
Historical population
Year	Pop.	±%
1869	315	—
1880	350	+11.1%
1890	354	+1.1%
1900	305	−13.8%
1910	309	+1.3%
1921	320	+3.6%
1930	273	−14.7%
1950	200	−26.7%
1961	186	−7.0%
1970	165	−11.3%
1980	128	−22.4%
1991	97	−24.2%
2001	87	−10.3%
2011	99	+13.8%
2021	97	−2.0%
Source: Censuses
