= List of zoos in the Czech Republic =

This list of zoos, animal parks, safari parks, wildlife parks, bird parks, aquariums, wildlife sanctuaries and nature reserves where visitors are allowed in the Czech Republic is sorted by location.

City/town	Name	Year of opening	Area (ha)	No. of animals	No. of species	Web presence	Annual visitors	Memberships
Bošovice	Bošovice Parrot Zoo	2011		195	47	Web	24,424	ACHEP
Brno	Brno Zoo	1953	41.3	1840	397	Web	308,112	UCSZOO, EARAZA, EAZA, WAZA, IZE, ISIS
Brno	Obora Holedná	1985	327		9+	Web		
Děčín	Děčín Zoo	1949	6	416	158	Web	114,489	UCSZOO, WAZA, EAZA, ISIS, IZE
Dvorec	Dvorec Zoo	2007	6	90	38	Web	61,427	CACHOK
Chleby	Chleby Zoo	1997	4.65	450	150	Web	56,280	UCSZOO, EARAZA
Choltice	Choltická obora	2013	69		21+	Web		
Chomutov	Zoopark Chomutov	1975	112	1120	160	Web	287,207	UCSZOO, EARAZA, EAZA, WAZA, ISIS
Dvůr Králové	Safari Park Dvůr Králové	1946	72	2489	331	Web	524,721	UCSZOO, EAZA, EARAZA, IZE, ISIS
Hluboká nad Vltavou	Hluboká Zoo	1939	6	2295	328	Web	260,014	UCSZOO, EARAZA, EAZA, WAZA, IZE, ISIS
Hodonín	Hodonín Zoo	1977	5.7	821	246	Web	166,364	UCSZOO, EARAZA, EAZA, ISIS
Horní Pěna	Zoo Na Hrádečku							
Hradec Králové	Aquarium Hradec Králové	1998			40	Web		
Jihlava	Jihlava Zoo	1982	8.9	1077	239	Web	316,654	UCSZOO, EAZA, WAZA, IZE, ISIS
Josefov	Josefov Meadows Bird Reserve	2008	42		400+	Web		
Kvilda	NC Kvilda	2015	9	7	2	Web	107,000	
Lány	Lánská obora	1713	3005		20+	Web		
Lešná	Zlín-Lešná Zoo	1948	74	1467	226	Web	630,621	UCSZOO, SAZA, EAZA, WAZA, IZE, ISIS, UBZCR
Liberec	Liberec Zoo	1919	14	839	159	Web	355,336	UCSZOO, EAZA, WAZA, IZE, ISIS
Milovice	Milovice Nature Reserve	2015	160	70	3	Web		
Olomouc	Olomouc Zoo	1956	43	1924	400	Web	339,162	UCSZOO, EARAZA, EAZA, WAZA, IZE, ISIS
Ostrava	Ostrava Zoo	1951	100	4075	417	Web	506,973	UCSZOO, AEECL, UCBZ, EAZA, WAZA, ISIS, CCBC
Plzeň	Plzeň Zoo	1926	21	5712	1192	Web	452,762	UCSZOO, AEECL, BGCI, EAZA
Prague	Zoo Mořský svět Praha	2002	0.1	4340	250	Web	79,409	
Prague	Prague Zoo	1931	58	5017	690	Web	1,445,126	UCSZOO, EARAZA, EAZA, WAZA
Protivín	Crocodile Zoo Protivín	2008		120	20	Web		
Srní	NC Srní	2015	3	11	1	Web	175,000	
Štramberk	Aqua Terra Štramberk	2003		100+		Web		
Tábor	Tábor Zoo	2015		286	65	Web	70,000+	
Ústí nad Labem	Ústí nad Labem Zoo	1908	26	1520	235	Web	163,994	UCSZOO, EAZA, WAZA, IZE, ISIS
Vlašim	paraZoo rescue	2012			29+	Web		CSOP
Vyškov	Vyškov Zoo	1965	9	1197	123	Web	170,198	UCSZOO, EARAZA
Zájezd	Zájezd Zoo	2010		246	54	Web	33,000	
Žleby	Obora Žleby	1998	121		13+	Web		

== See also ==
- List of zoos by country
- European Association of Zoos and Aquaria - EAZA
- World Association of Zoos and Aquariums - WAZA
- International Zoo Educators Association - IZE
- Species360 - ISIS
- International Union for Conservation of Nature - IUCN
- Botanic Gardens Conservation International - BGCI
- Union of Czech and Slovak Zoological Gardens - UCSZOO

== Sources ==
The 2017 Annual Report of UCSZOO - The Union of Czech and Slovak Zoos
