= Chleby =

Chleby may refer to places in the Czech Republic:

- Chleby (Benešov District), a municipality and village in the Central Bohemian Region
- Chleby (Nymburk District), a municipality and village in the Central Bohemian Region
  - Chleby Zoo
