= Martyrs of Prague =

Collective group of Roman Catholics martyrs

Blessed Martyrs of Prague O.F.M.
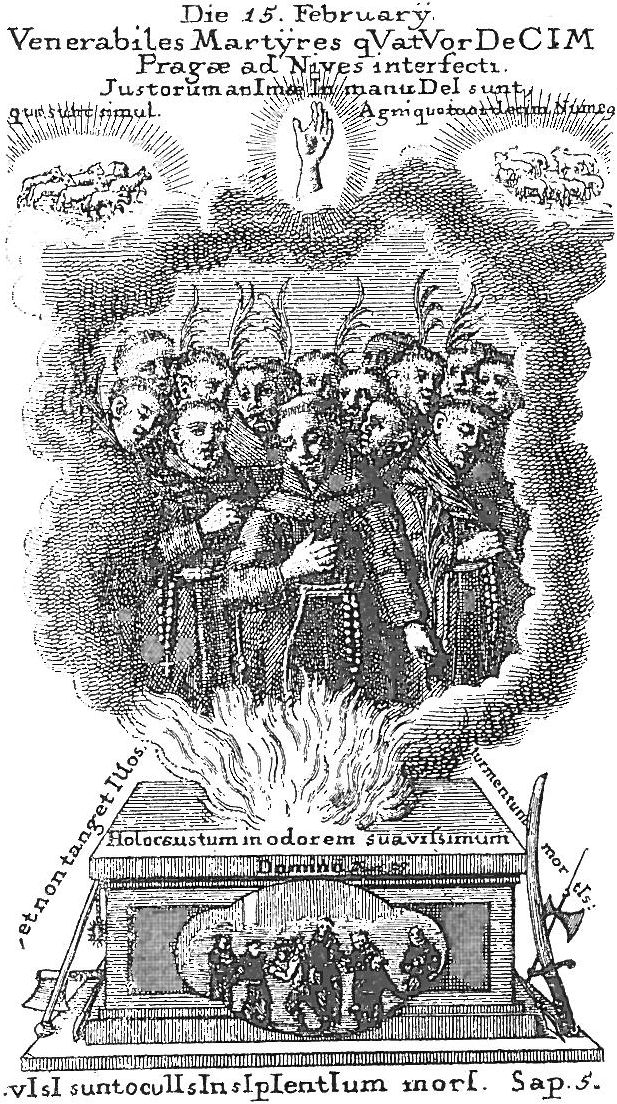

Martyrs, priests and religious
- Born: Between 1541 and 1603; Various
- Died: 15 February 1611; Prague, Kingdom of Bohemia
- Beatified: 13 October 2012, St. Vitus Cathedral, Prague, Czech Republic, by Cardinal Angelo Amato, S.D.B.
- Feast: 15 February
- Attributes: Franciscan habit Palm branch

Frederick Bachstein and his thirteen companions (born between 1541 and 1603 – died 15 February 1611) were a collective group of members, both priests and lay brothers, of the Order of Friars Minor, who were murdered by a group of Protestants in the early 17th century.

Four of the men were Czech while there was one Spaniard, one Frenchman, four Italians, three Germans, and one Dutchman. Three were seminarians in the Order, while another three were novices, while the rest were all priests. The Franciscan friars had settled in Prague in 1604 and set out to administer the sacraments as well as to tend to the ill and poor of the city. They became known for their preaching, despite consistent threats leveled against them from members of the Protestant population. The fourteen were slain after Emperor Rudolf II invaded the city; they were taken by surprise in a sudden attack on their friary at the Church of Our Lady of the Snows of the city and were all slain at the hands of a Lutheran mob.

The cause for their canonization was launched in the 1930s, but it was suspended until the process was resumed in 1992. Pope Benedict XVI confirmed their beatification, which was celebrated in Prague on 13 October 2012.

== Life ==
=== Background ===
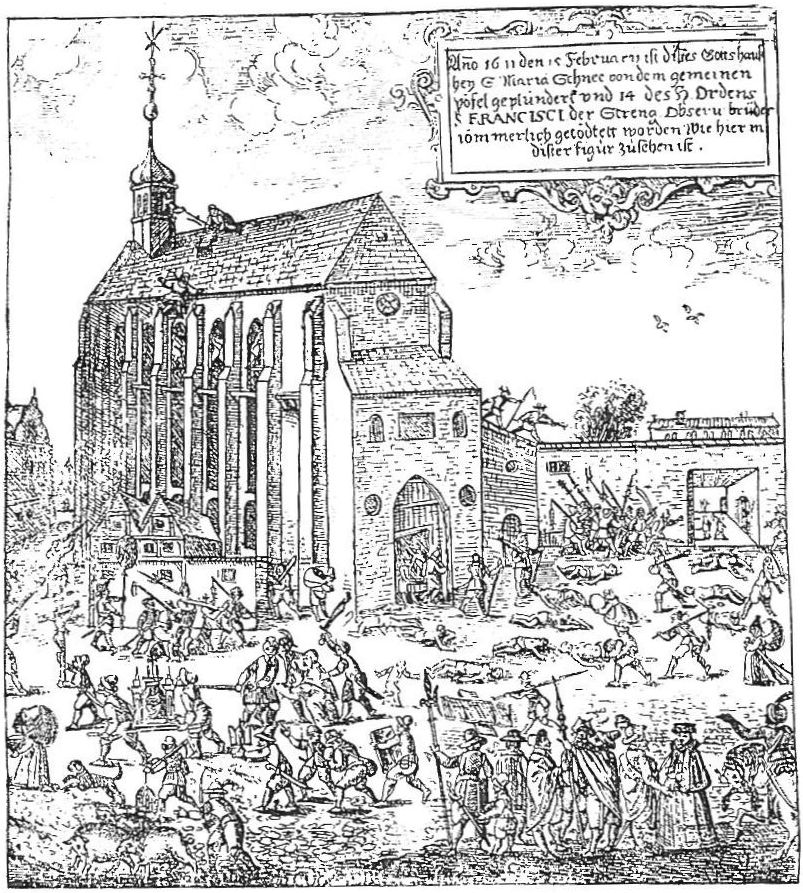
The Franciscans are killed in Prague.

The fourteen Friars Minor were killed in the religious and political context of a struggle between the Catholic forces of the Holy Roman Emperor Rudolf II and the reformed states of Bohemia. They had settled in Prague in 1604 at the ruined friary of the Church of Our Lady of the Snows in the city, which had been built by the Carmelite friars in the 15th century.

The Friars Minor were noted in Prague for their consistent preaching and administering the sacraments to people. The friars also undertook charitable apostolates that saw them visit the sick and help the poor, despite the hostile environment where most people belonged to Protestant churches. The example of the friars encouraged lapsed Catholics to return to their faith, and even some Protestants to convert to the Catholic faith. This created anti-Catholic sentiment in the Lutheran communities who felt that the Franciscan friars had forced these conversions and should not be welcome in Prague. This led to the friars being insulted and receiving threats while out on the streets tending to the poor.

Tensions came to a head on 15 February 1611 after armed forces under the command of Emperor Rudolf invaded Prague to consolidate his empire. The fear in people, and in particular among the Lutherans, saw the city explode into crisis. Radicals began to attack Catholics, which led to a crowd of almost two thousand men breaking into the Franciscan friary, under the mistaken assumption that some Catholic soldiers were at the friary since the Franciscans would provide shelter and protect them. The Dutch friar Cristoffel Zelt was the first slain as he carried firewood to the oven. The German cleric Klemens was the next killed when he was struck with an axe before the French priest Simon was stabbed to death in his sickbed. The next to be killed was the Milanese friar Girolamo dei Conti Arese, as he was before the image of the Mother of God. Both the Italian priest Bartolomeo Dalmasoni and the religious Giovanni Bodeo were killed as the people hurled insults and blasphemies at them. The mob proceeded to kill the Spanish priest Juan Martínez in his attempt to protect the Eucharist and had his arm cut off in the melee before his skull was smashed. The Czech vicar Bedřich Bachstein was the next one killed as he hid in the bell tower with the novices Jan and Antonín alongside the kitchen assistant Emanuel. The mob located them and beat them before hurling their bodies down from the tower to the ground below. The Italian subdeacon Gaspare Daverio was located near the bell tower and torn to pieces before his remains were thrown out of the window before the German duo Jan Didak and Jakob were likewise slain. The attack lasted no longer than three hours but left the fourteen friars dead and their convent and church in ruins.

The friars died on Shrove Tuesday and their remains were dumped near the friary, but then provided a Christian burial within the week on 19 February 1611. Their remains were later re-interred in the church's side chapel in 1616 at the behest of the Archbishop of Prague Jan Lohelius. Their bodies were exhumed and seen to have decomposed to a slight degree. Their remains were exhumed once more in 2012 to be subject to scientific examination.

Fourteen of the attackers were sentenced at a court in Prague in April 1611 and were all executed for the murder of the fourteen Franciscans.

=== Individual list ===
==== Bedřich Bachstein ====
Bachstein was born circa 1561 in Pená at Jindřichův Hradec. He served as the Novice Master for the friars and also served as the vicar for the convent. Bachstein was killed with a spear blow to the heart as he hid in the bell tower with two of the novices and the kitchen assistant. His remains were hurled out of the tower to the ground below alongside those of the ones slain with him.

==== Juan Martínez ====
Martínez was born in Spain circa 1571 and served as both the sacristan and the confessor for those who were Spanish and living in Prague. He attempted to hide the Eucharist during the riot and lost his right hand and then his head to the mob. His skull was smashed in before his head was cut off. Martínez was attempting to protect a ciborium when his right hand was severed, and he was stabbed in the back as his head was smashed. The assailants then trampled over the sacred hosts.

==== Simon ====
Simon was born circa 1581 in France and was tasked to collect alms in Prague. He became ill in 1611 and during the riot, was bedridden in his cell when the crowds located him. Simon's skull was smashed in, and he was stabbed to death in the stomach.

==== Bartolomeo Dalmasoni ====
Dalmasoni was born at Ponte San Pietro in Bergamo and was in charge of the reconstruction efforts for the church and its attached convent. The crowds located him in the basement where he was hidden and attacked him to death with swords.

==== Girolamo dei Conti Arese ====
Arese was born circa 1597 in Milan and was a deacon at the time of his death. The rioters ambushed him and stabbed him to death with a sword as he knelt in meditation before the altar of the Mother of God.

==== Gaspare Daverio ====
Daverio was born in Bosto in Varese on 27 April 1584 and was a subdeacon at the time of his death. The assailants killed him after he was thrown off the roof of the church.

==== Jakob ====
Jakob was born circa 1590 in Augsburg and had made his initial profession. He was killed after he was thrown off the roof of the church.

==== Klemens ====
Klemens was born circa 1590 in the Electorate of Saxony and had made his initial profession at the time of his death. He was slain after his head was cut in two with an axe.

==== Christoffel Zelt ====
Zelt was born circa 1541 in the Netherlands and was a cook at the convent. He was the first to be killed in the riot after his head was smashed in with an iron club.

==== Jan Didak ====
Didak was born circa 1576 in Germany. He was thrown off the bell tower to his death.

==== Giovanni Bodeo ====
Bodeo was born circa 1581 in Mompiano in Brescia and served as the gardener at the convent and as the assistant to the sacristan. He took refuge in the basement while the riot took place but was found and killed with swords after his assailants scourged him.

==== Emmanuel ====
Emmanuel was born circa 1581 in the Kingdom of Bohemia (now the Czech Republic) and worked as a cook at the convent. The rioters smashed his head against the wall when he was found at the bell tower in hiding before throwing his remains down to the ground from the roof of the church.

==== Jan ====
Jan was born circa 1603 in the Kingdom of Bohemia (now the Czech Republic) and was a novice cleric at the time of his death. He was killed when he was struck with an iron club.

==== Antonín ====
Antonín was born sometime between 1601 and 1603 in the Kingdom of Bohemia (now the Czech Republic) and was a novice at the time of his death. He was killed when he was stabbed to death with a sword.

== Beatification ==
The beatification process for the fourteen slain Franciscans was opened in Prague in an investigative process that was launched on 11 May 1933. The process concluded on 24 November 1944 and had completed its goal to assess the lives and holiness of the fourteen Franciscans and to assess the circumstances that led to their deaths. But the cause was submitted to authorities at the Congregation for Rites in Rome and languished until a decree was issued on 25 February 1992 to resume the cause. The Prague archdiocese launched another diocesan investigation and submitted their findings to the Congregation for the Causes of Saints who issued their "nihil obstat" (no objections) decree on 14 April 1994. The C.C.S. officials validated the processes on 20 April 1994 after having determined that the diocesan investigations complied with their regulations.

The postulation (officials in charge of the cause) submitted the official "Positio" dossier to the C.C.S. in 2003. Historians discussed and approved the cause on 16 December 2003 after issuing their satisfaction at assessing and resolving the historical circumstances that surrounded their deaths. The nine theological consultants also provided their approval on 5 March 2011 before the cardinal and bishop members of the C.C.S. issued their final approval on 10 January 2012.

Pope Benedict XVI signed a decree on 10 May 2012 that the fourteen Franciscans had died "in odium fidei" (in hatred of the faith) and could be beatified. Cardinal Angelo Amato presided at the beatification ceremony in Prague on the pope's behalf on 13 October 2012. Some 6,000 people attended, including 250 priests and around 300 monastic brothers and sisters. The Cardinal Archbishop of Prague Dominik Duka was one of four cardinals present. Benedict XVI mentioned the beatification in his Angelus address on 14 October and said that "they remind us that believing in Christ also means being willing to suffer with Him and for Him".

The current postulator for this cause is the Franciscan friar Giovangiuseppe Califano.
