= Borovany =

- Town
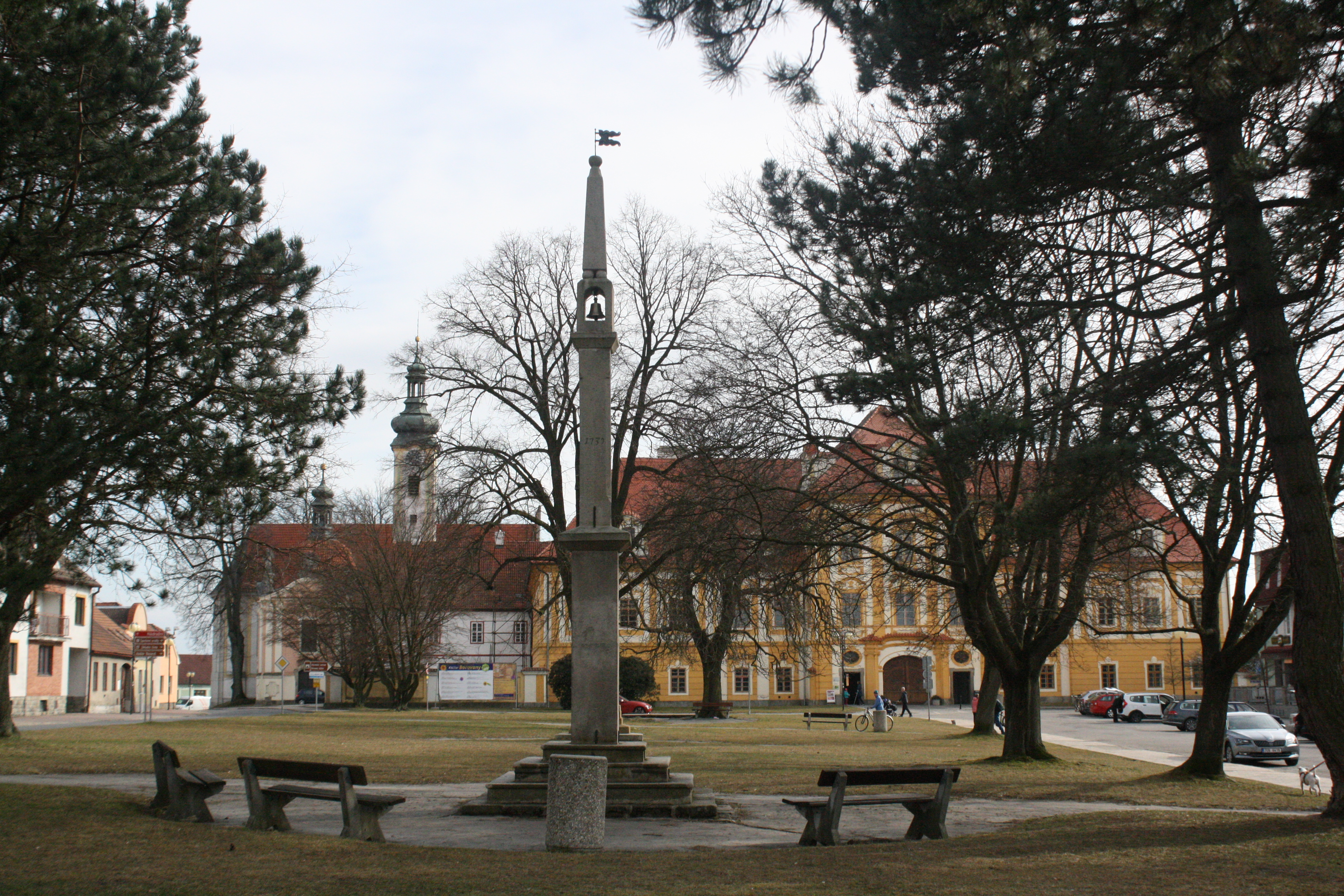
- Pillory in the centre of the town square

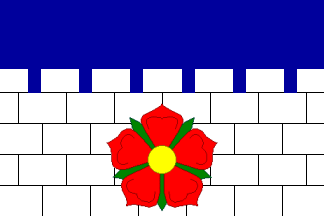
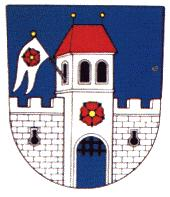
- Flag Coat of arms

- Location in the Czech Republic
- Coordinates: 48°53′55″N 14°38′32″E
- Country: Czech Republic
- Region: South Bohemian
- District: České Budějovice
- First mentioned: 1186

Government
  - Mayor: Vít Fialka

Area
  - Total: 42.33 km^{2} (16.34 sq mi)
- Elevation: 522 m (1,713 ft)

Population (2026-01-01)
  - Total: 4,168
  - Density: 98.46/km^{2} (255.0/sq mi)
- Time zone: UTC+1 (CET)
  - Summer (DST): UTC+2 (CEST)
- Postal code: 373 12
- Website: www.borovany-cb.cz

Borovany (Czech pronunciation: [ˈborovanɪ]; German: Forbes) is a town in České Budějovice District in the South Bohemian Region of the Czech Republic. It has about 4,200 inhabitants. The town is located near the Stropnice River.

Trocnov, today a part of Borovany, is known as the birthplace of one of the most notable people of Czech history, general Jan Žižka. The locality of the original Trocnov hamlet is protected as a national cultural monument.

== Administrative division ==
Borovany consists of seven municipal parts (in brackets population according to the 2021 census):

- Borovany (2,828)
- Dvorec (102)
- Hluboká u Borovan (418)
- Radostice (250)
- Třebeč (164)
- Trocnov (94)
- Vrcov (184)

== Etymology ==
The name Borovany is derived from the place name Borová, meaning "the village of people from Borová".

== Geography ==
Borovany is located about 13 kilometres (8 mi) southeast of České Budějovice. It lies in the Gratzen Foothills. The highest point is at 544 m (1,785 ft) above sea level. The Stropnice River flows through the municipal territory. There are many fishponds around the town.

== History ==
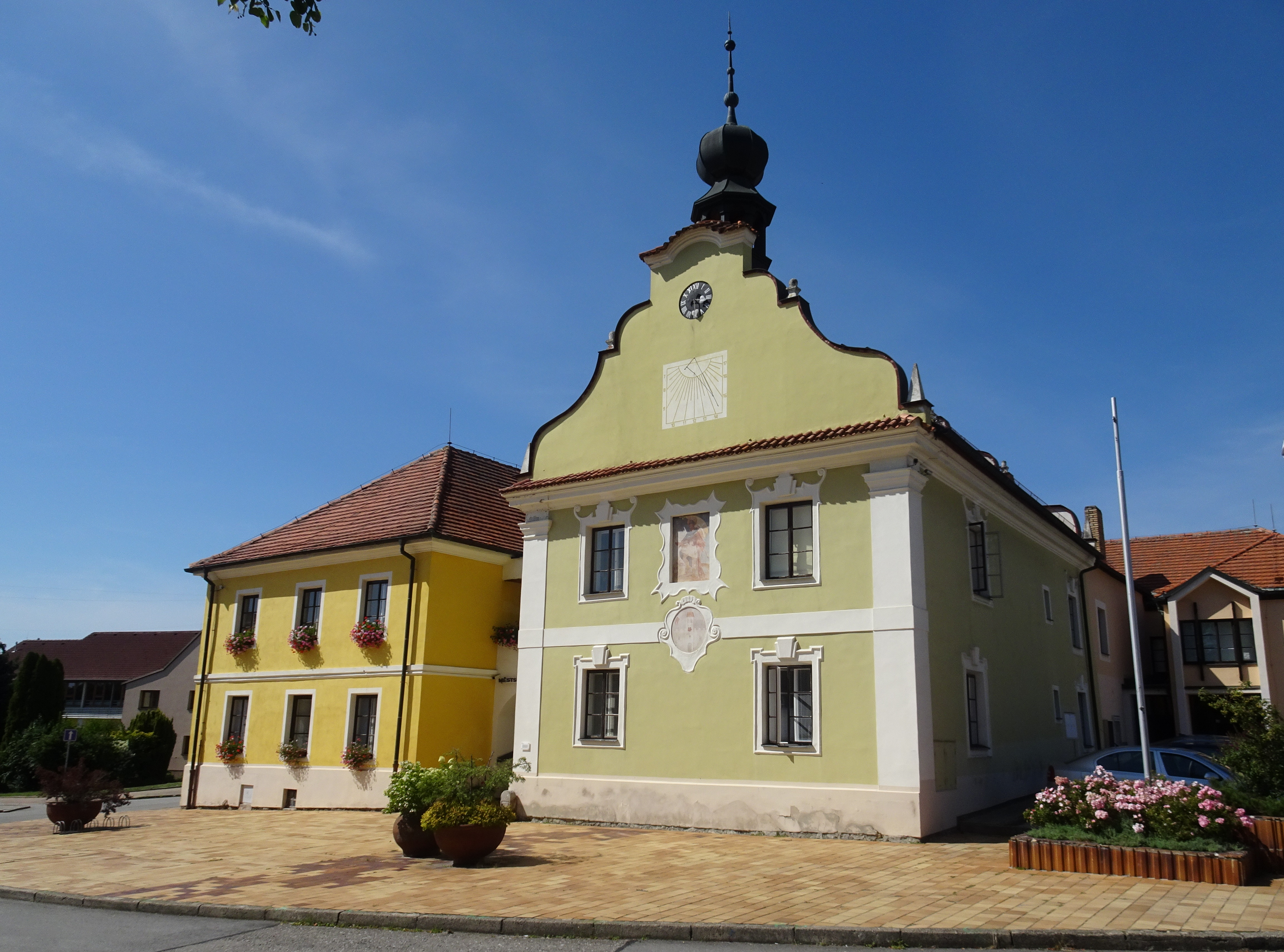
Town hall

The first written mention of Borovany is from 1186. In 1455, the Borovany Monastery was founded.

In the 19th century, the development of the village occurred with the construction of the České Budějovice–Vienna railway, which was completed in 1869, and with the discovery of diatomaceous earth deposits at the end of the century. It began to be intensively mined and processed for the construction industry after World War I. Another plant was constructed after World War II and the third one in the 1970. In 1973, Borovany received the status of a town.

== Demographics ==
Historical population

Year	Pop.	±%
1869	2,378	—
1880	2,636	+10.8%
1890	2,536	−3.8%
1900	2,638	+4.0%
1910	2,839	+7.6%

Year	Pop.	±%
1921	2,924	+3.0%
1930	2,915	−0.3%
1950	2,529	−13.2%
1961	2,740	+8.3%
1970	2,682	−2.1%

Year	Pop.	±%
1980	3,045	+13.5%
1991	3,312	+8.8%
2001	3,584	+8.2%
2011	3,936	+9.8%
2021	4,040	+2.6%

Source: Censuses

== Transport ==
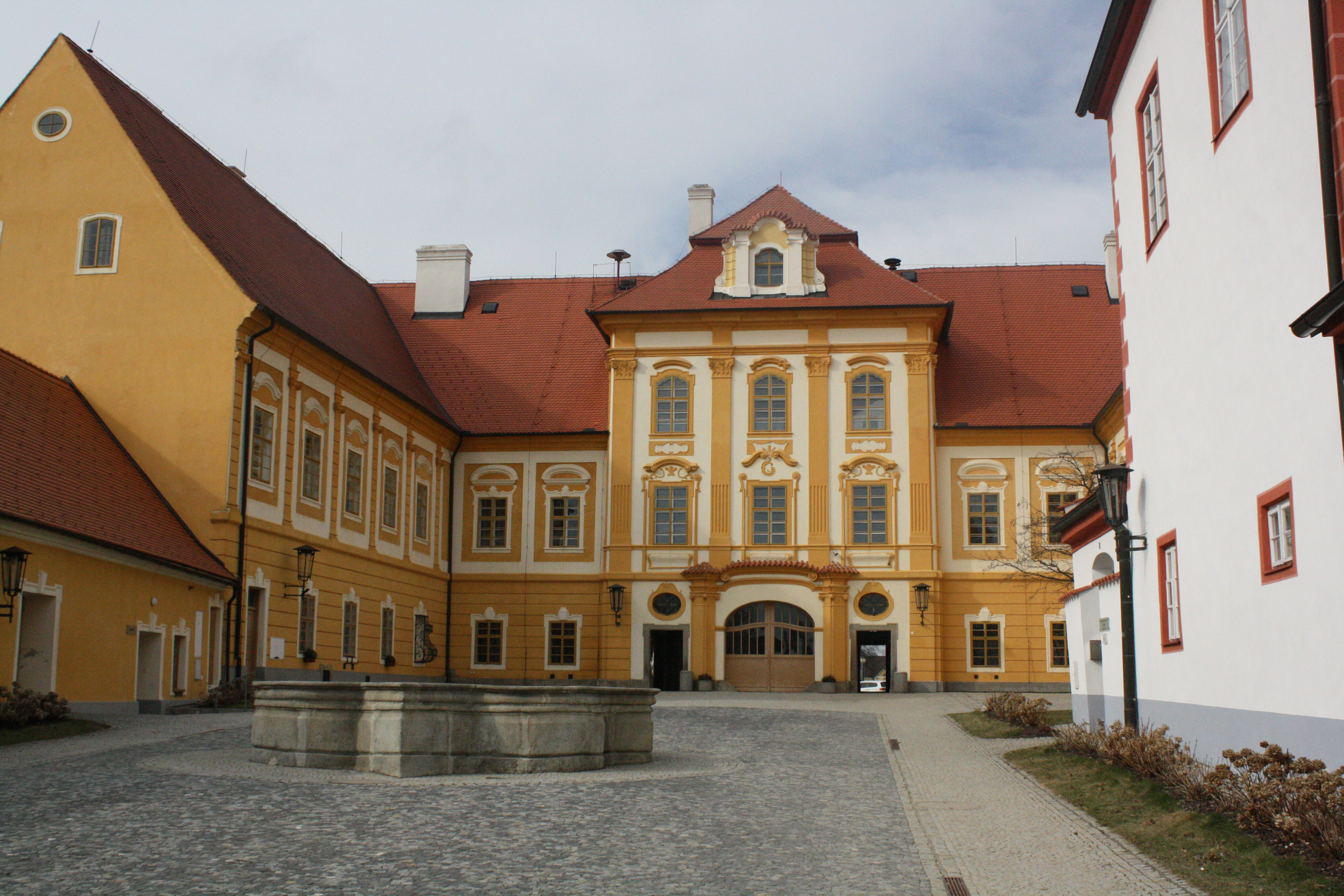
Borovany Castle

Borovany is located on the railway line České Budějovice–České Velenice. The town's territory is served by four train stations and stops: Borovany, Hluboká u Borovan, Radostice u Trocnova and Trocnov.

== Sights ==
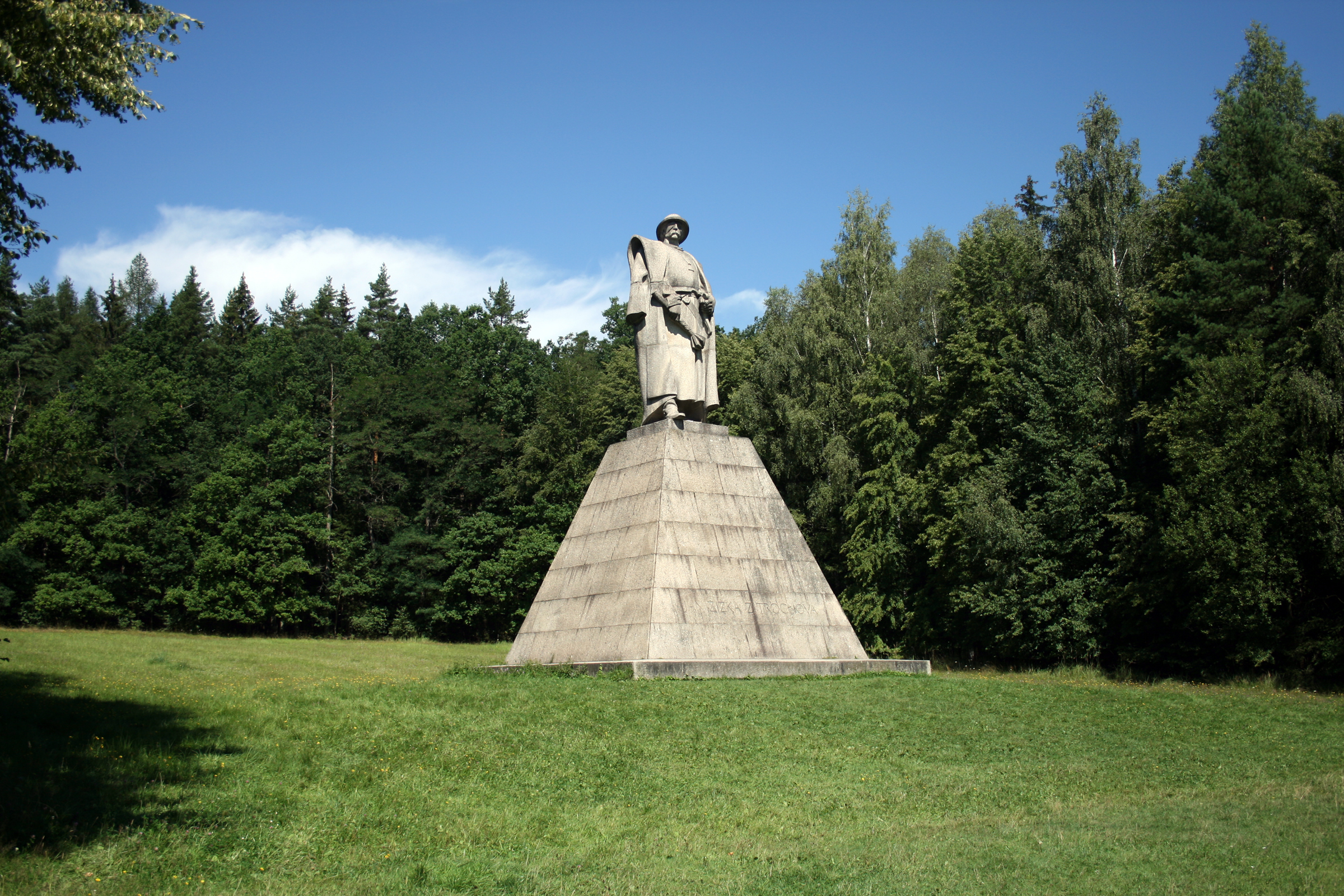
Jan Žižka Monument in Trocnov

The Borovany Castle was built in the Baroque style in 1760–1770. It was originally part of the monastery, but the monastery was abolished in 1785, and the Schwarzenberg family bought the building and used it as a castle. The Schwarzenbergs owned it until 1939, when it was purchased by the town, which established a museum there.

Next to the castle is the Church of the Visitation of the Virgin Mary. It was built between the 1470s and 1490s. It was built in the late Gothic style, atypical for this region. The rectory next to the church was built together with the castle and is connected with it.

Trocnov is known as the birthplace of one of the most notable people of Czech history, general Jan Žižka. The site where the original Trocnov hamlet was located consists of foundations of the original buildings, Jan Žižka Monument, Jan Žižka Memorial, and monument at the place of Žižka's birth. The locality is protected as a national cultural monument.

In Dvorec is the Dvorec Zoo, one of the smallest zoos in the country. It keeps 120 species of animals.

== Notable people ==
- Jan Žižka (c. 1360 – 1424), general
- Tomáš Verner (born 1986), figure skater; lived here
