= Church of Our Lady of the Snows (Prague) =

Catholic church in Prague, Czech Republic

Coordinates: 50.0830°N 14.4236°E

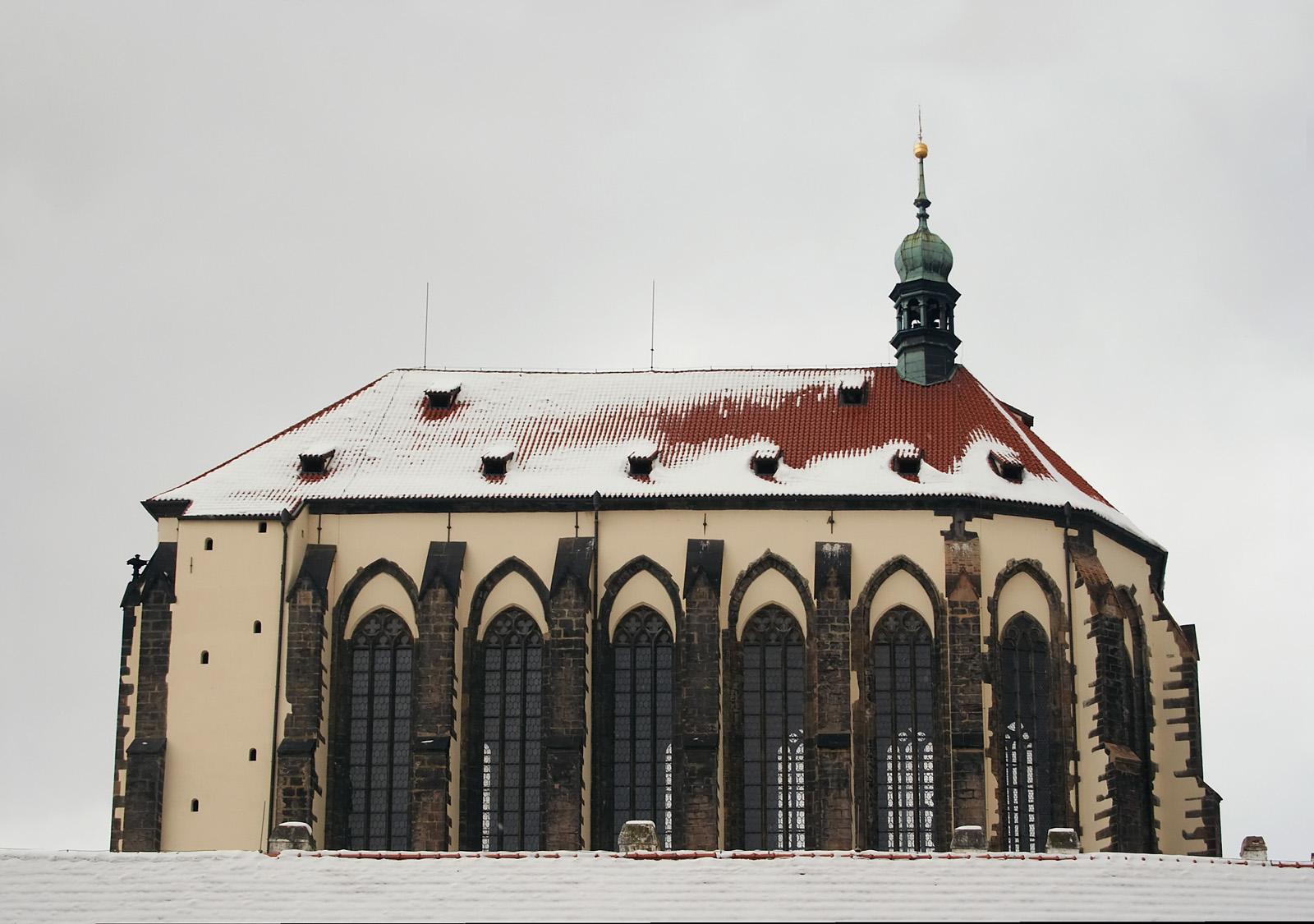
Church of Our Lady of the Snows

The Church of Our Lady of the Snows (Czech: Panny Marie Sněžné) is a Catholic church established in 1347 near Jungmann Square in Prague, Czech Republic. It is operated by the Franciscans and was the site of the murders of the Martyrs of Prague in 1611.

This church has one of the highest vaults in Prague (34 metres (112 ft)). It was supposed to be the second biggest church in Prague (after St. Vitus Cathedral), but it was not completed. The current form consists only of the presbytery of the church.

== History ==
The church along with a monastery of the Carmelite order was founded in 1347 on the occasion of the coronation of Emperor Charles IV and his wife Blanche of Valois. The Carmelites have been a mendicant order since 1245, which at that time meant that they were not allowed to own any land. They therefore had no resources for building the church. Emperor Charles then donated a large plot to them which they could partly rent out for income, along with the wood which had been used to build his coronation hall. This, along with contributions from the citizens of Prague, was enough to construct the currently visible part of the building. The construction of the church was further delayed because of continued problems with funds.

During the Hussite Wars of the 15th century, construction was interrupted, the church was heavily damaged, and the friars abandoned the monastery. The complex fell into disrepair by the end of the 16th century. At the beginning of the 17th century the church was taken over by the Friars Minor, to whom it was entrusted by the King of Bohemia Emperor Rudolf II.

In 1611, during the Passau army incursion, the community of fourteen friars were killed when a Lutheran rabble from the city of Prague attacked and looted the monastery. These friars are known as the Martyrs of Prague. They were beatified in 2012 by Pope Benedict XVI.

The church itself was modified during the Renaissance and Baroque (mostly in the second half of the 17th century).

Today, the Gothic presbytery still serves as a Franciscan church. The northern aisle is accessible from the eastern corner of Jungmann Square through the gate which originally led to the cemetery behind the church.

== Architecture ==
The church above the Franciscan Garden, between 1890 and 1921

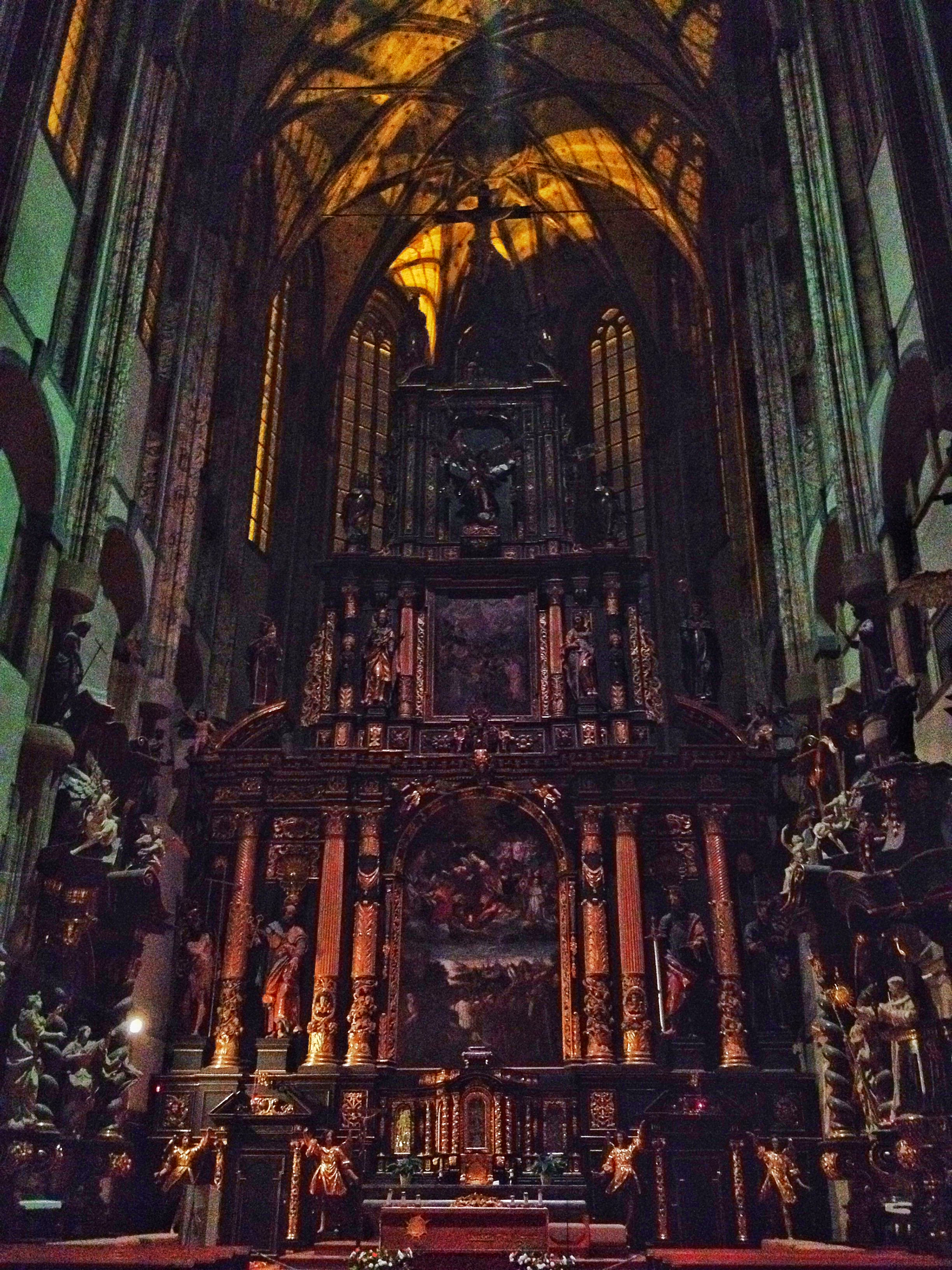
The interior of the church at night

According to the last archaeological research from the 1980s and preserved contemporary documentation, the church was meant to be about 110 meters long. (In comparison, the biggest Gothic cathedral in Prague St. Vitus Cathedral - is 124 meters long.) Which means that nowadays it would be occupying the whole area of the Jungmann Square, almost reaching the building of the Adria Palace on the opposite side of the square. The only part that was built according to the plans was the presbytery with two small aisles and a great bell-tower by the western side of the northern aisle.

The construction of the tower began at the beginning of the 15th century. It was heavily damaged during the Hussite Wars. Also a great bell was shot down from it. In 1683 it collapsed. The existence of this tower can be proved by its remains which can be found in the church. In the most western corner of the northern aisle, there are about 2 meters wide and 1 meter high remains of the thick tower walls and spiral staircase.

The northern aisle is partially preserved. The roof and vaults crumbled long time ago, but the outer walls with the remains of the vaults and windows are still visible. The aisle was apparently built on a different principle from the main chancel. The most obvious difference is between the system and rhythm of the windows and the buttress system. The chancel walls are designed as a skeletal system with the windows reaching almost from one pillar to the next one, providing a huge amount of light inside of the chancel, whereas the windows of the aisle are relatively smaller and do not fill the whole space between the pillars. The pillars of the main chancel also do not interact logically with the inner space of the aisle. This was caused by the changes in plans between the two phases of building the aisle and the chancel around 1379. The builders decided to make the chancel taller, which resulted in enlarging of the buttress system.

Over the entrance to the aisle is a tympanum with the relief picturing God the Father, Jesus Christ and Holy Spirit. It is known as the Throne of Divine Wisdom. This tympanum was supposed to be placed on the original church portal, which was never built.

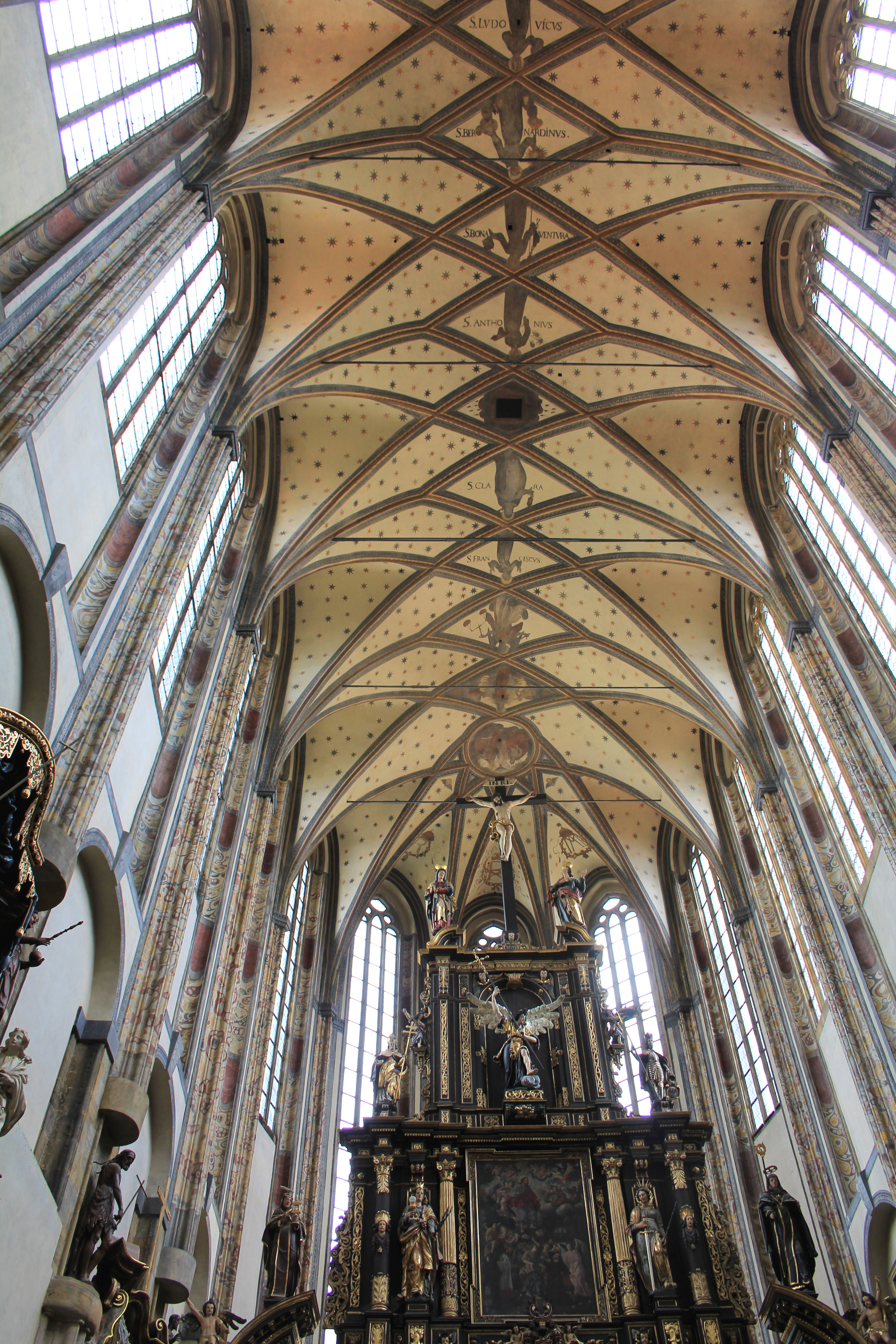
Church of Our Lady of the Snows - vault

Also the vault in the main chancel is not original. The original Gothic vault, which was even higher than the current one, was already completely destroyed by the end of the 16th century. In the 17th century was the church vaulted by the Franciscans. Along with the building of the new Renaissance vault, the vaultings of the windows were lowered, which can be still seen from the outside.

During the Renaissance a new portal was also built. Above the portal, between two Gothic windows is a mosaic of Our Lady of the Snow. Above the mosaic is a Gothic rose window.

The interior was changed considerably during the Baroque era. The most important is a 29 meters high early Baroque columned altar. On its top there are statues of Virgin Mary and crucified John the Evangelist. It was made between 1649 and 1651 by an unknown artist. The painting on the bottom part of the Altar was painted by Antonín Stevens.

== Sources ==
- Pavel KALINA, Jiří KOŤÁTKO: Praha 1310-1419, Kapitoly o vrcholné gotice.
- Růžena BAŤKOVÁ a kol.: Umělecké památky Prahy, Nové Město, Vyšehrad. Praha 1998.
- http://pms.ofm.cz/lang_en_uvod.html
