= Chleby (Benešov District) =

- Municipality
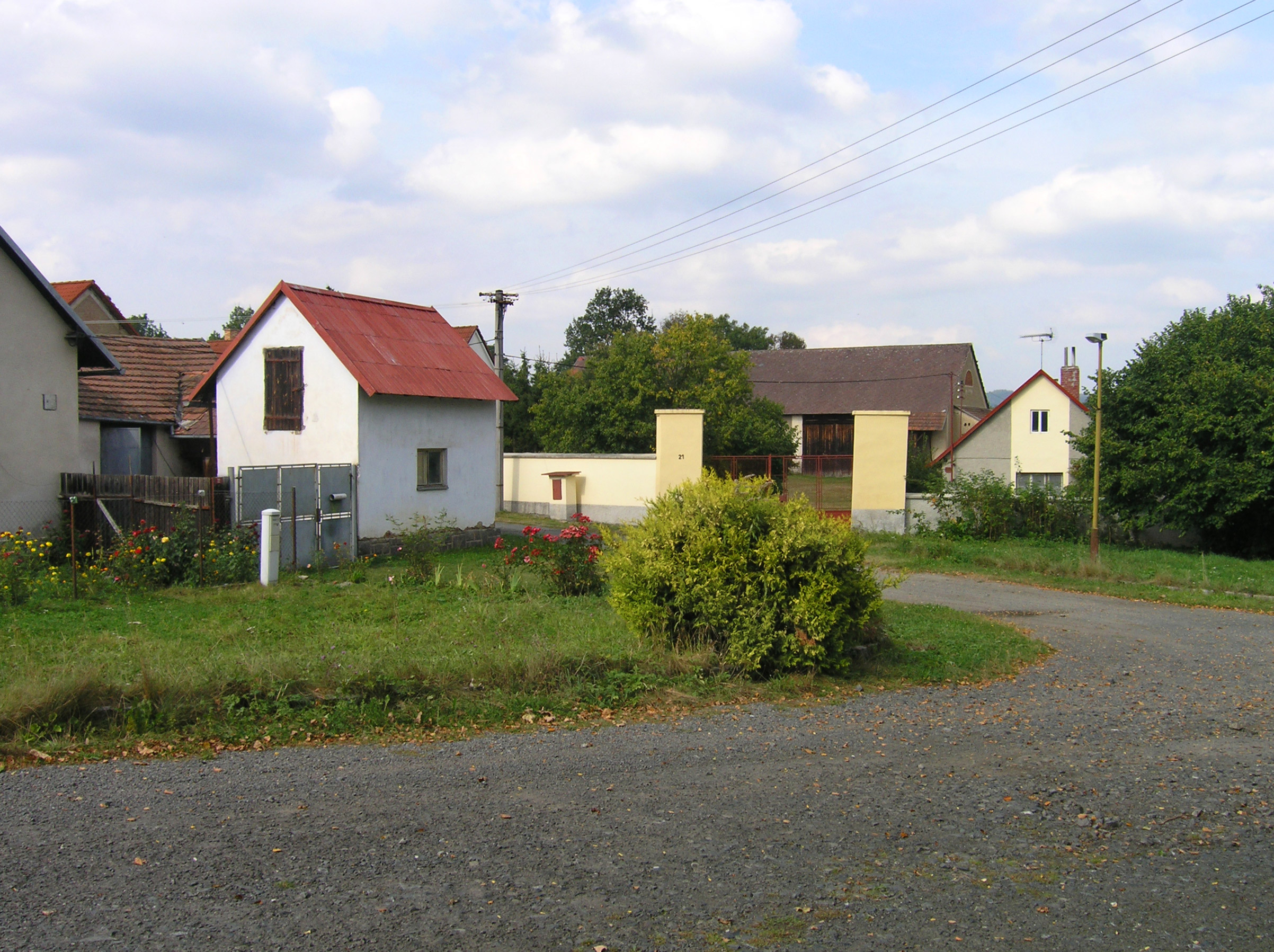
- Centre of Chleby

- Location in the Czech Republic
- Coordinates: 49°49′37″N 14°33′25″E
- Country: Czech Republic
- Region: Central Bohemian
- District: Benešov
- First mentioned: 1284

Area
  - Total: 2.34 km^{2} (0.90 sq mi)
- Elevation: 305 m (1,001 ft)

Population (2026-01-01)
  - Total: 52
  - Density: 22/km^{2} (58/sq mi)
- Time zone: UTC+1 (CET)
  - Summer (DST): UTC+2 (CEST)
- Postal code: 257 41
- Website: obec-chleby.cz

Chleby is a municipality and village in Benešov District in the Central Bohemian Region of the Czech Republic. It has about 50 inhabitants.

== Demographics ==
Historical population
Year	Pop.	±%
1869	160	—
1880	152	−5.0%
1890	154	+1.3%
1900	166	+7.8%
1910	163	−1.8%
1921	131	−19.6%
1930	138	+5.3%
1950	99	−28.3%
1961	89	−10.1%
1970	91	+2.2%
1980	67	−26.4%
1991	60	−10.4%
2001	64	+6.7%
2011	54	−15.6%
2021	46	−14.8%
Source: Censuses
