= Zájezd Zoo =

Zoopark Zájezd
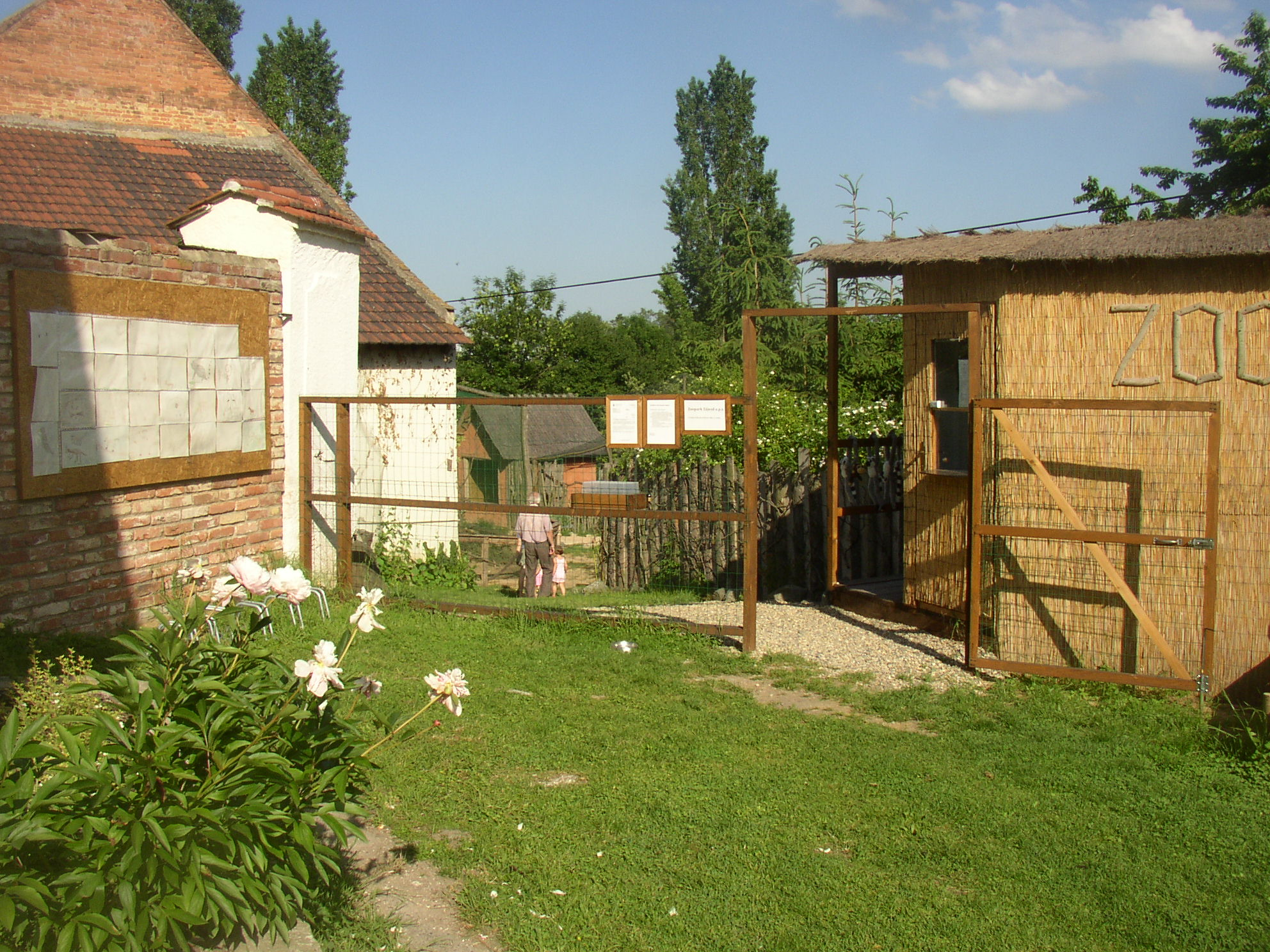
- Entrance
- Interactive map of Zoopark Zájezd
- 50.1666°N 14.2219°E
- Date opening: 2010
- Location: Zájezd, Czech Republic
- Land area: 1.5 hectares (3.7 acres)
- No. of species: Over 100
- Owner: Jiří Marek and Dana Fraňková
- Website: www.zoopark-zajezd.cz

Zájezd Zoo (Czech: Zoopark Zájezd) is a zoo in Zájezd in the Central Bohemian Region of the Czech Republic. It is one of the smallest zoos in the country.

== History ==
The zoo was founded in 1998 by Jiří Marek and Dana Fraňková, and opened its gates in 2010.

== Gallery ==
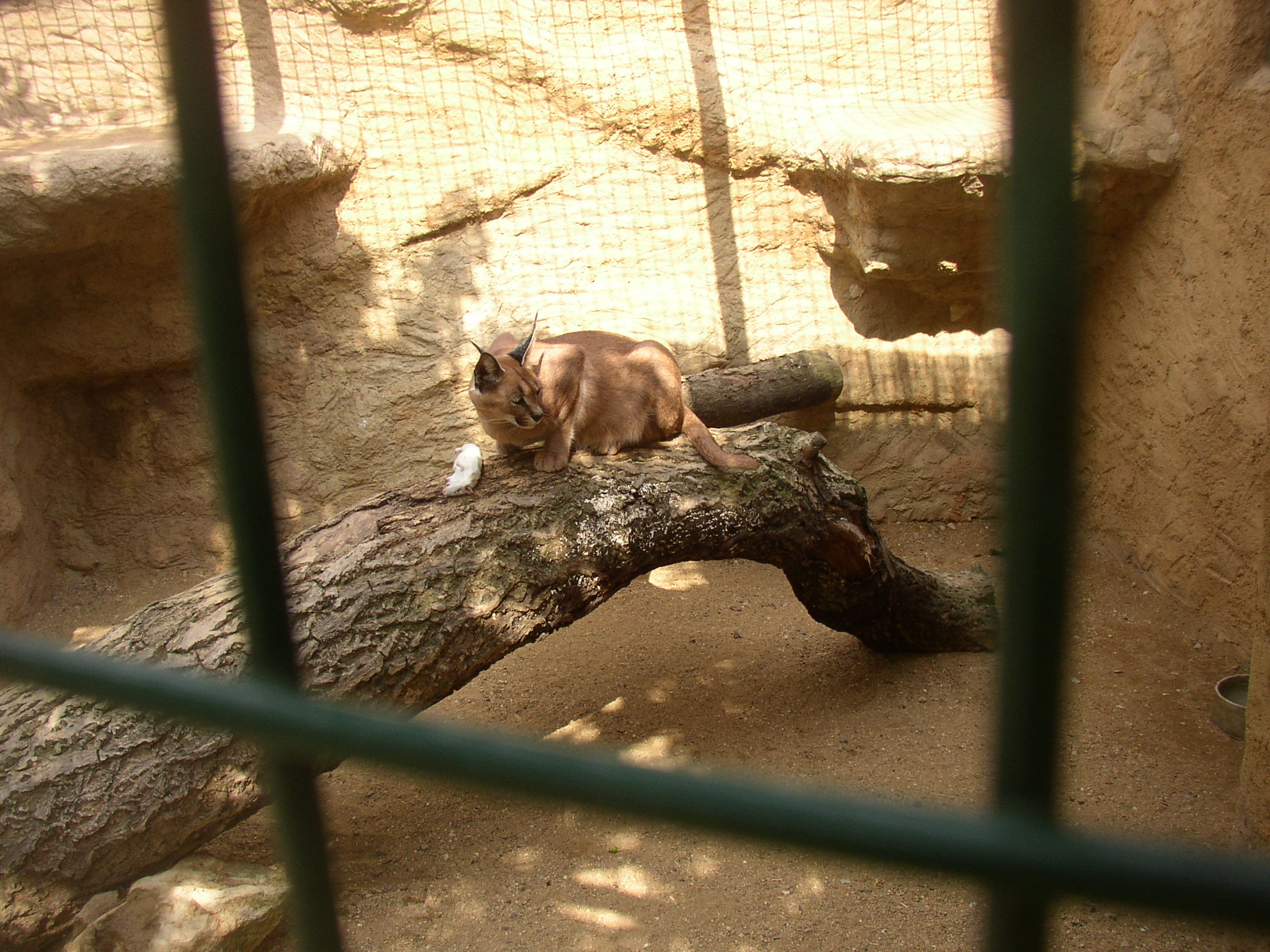

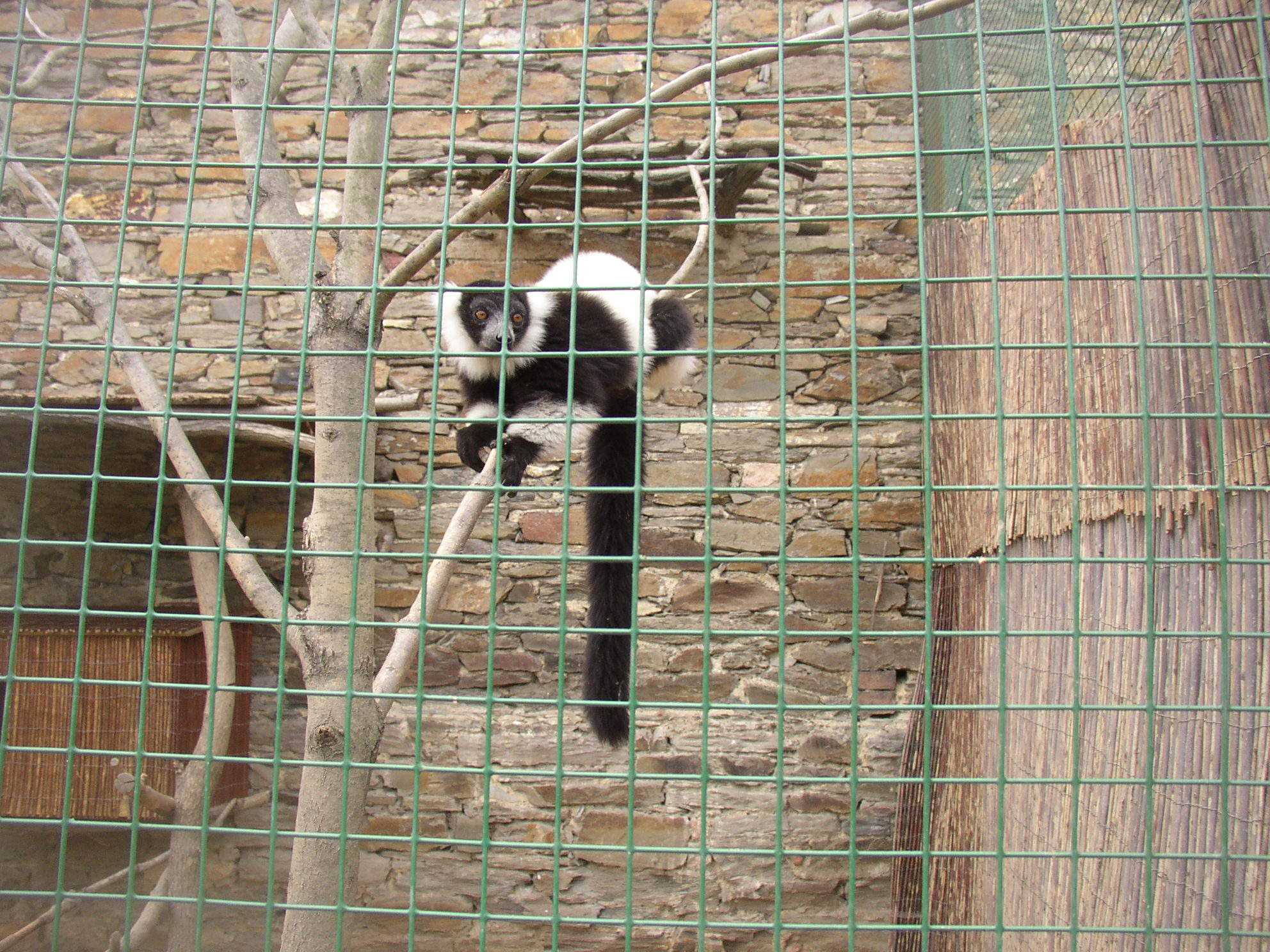

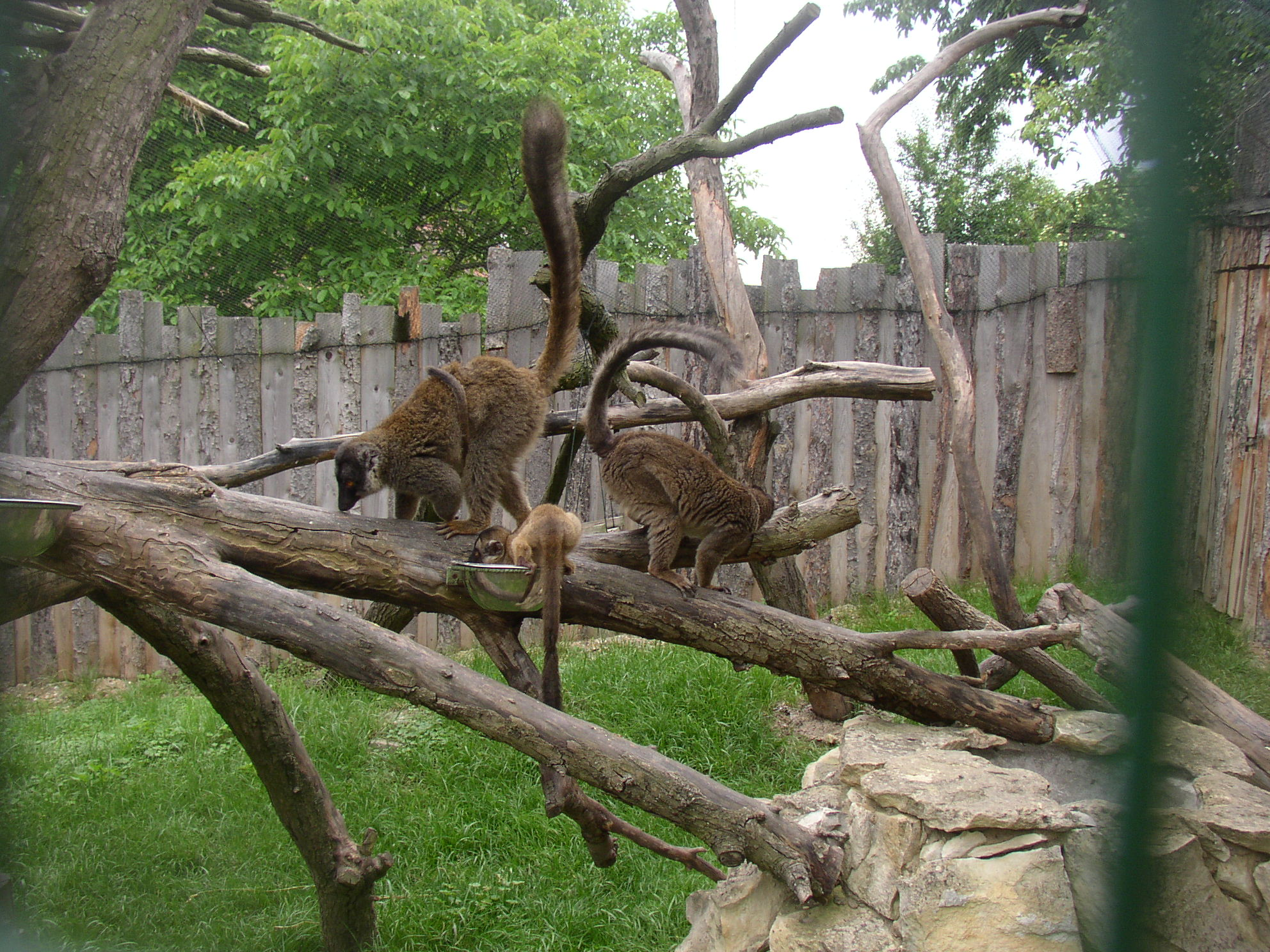

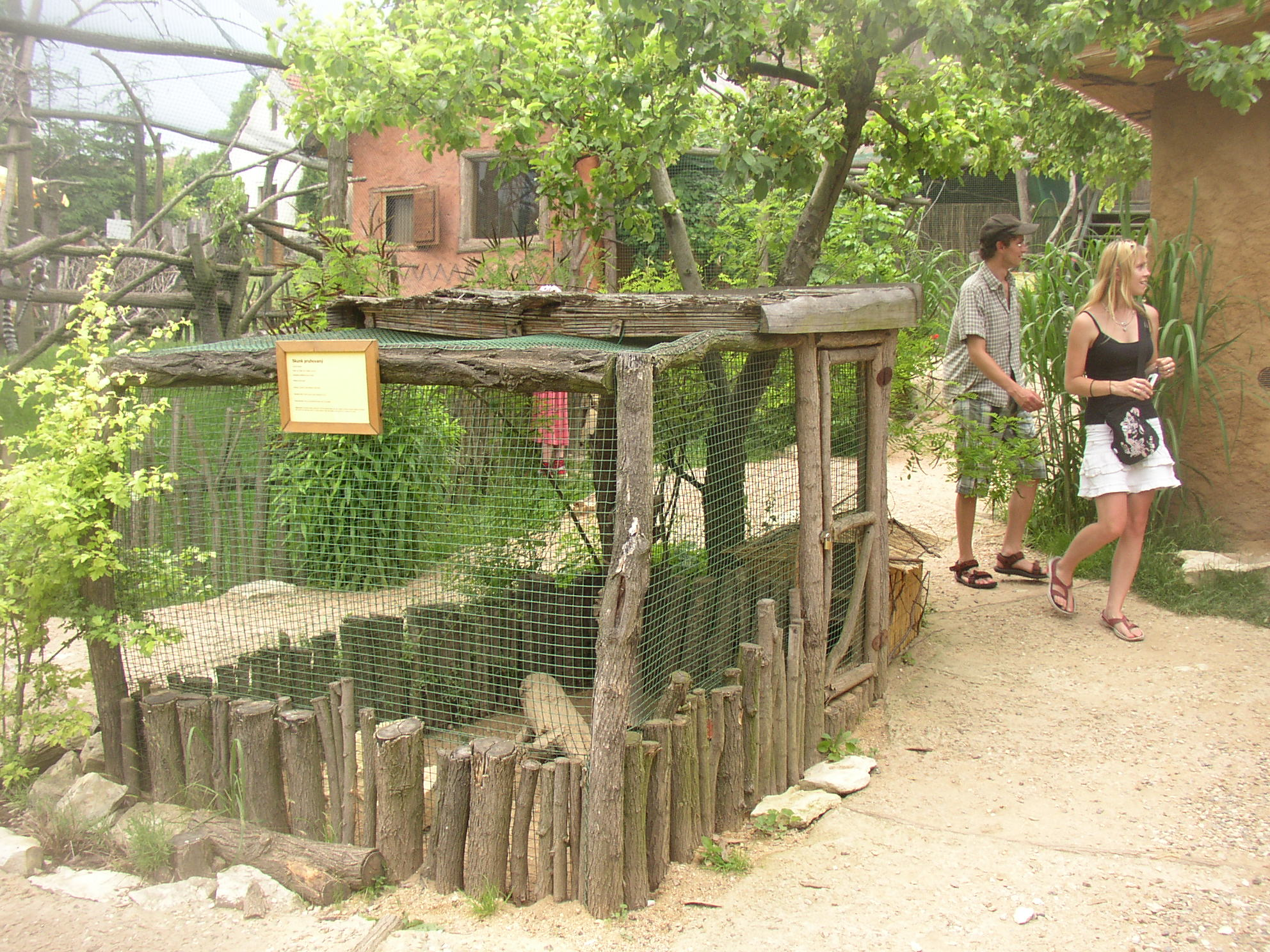

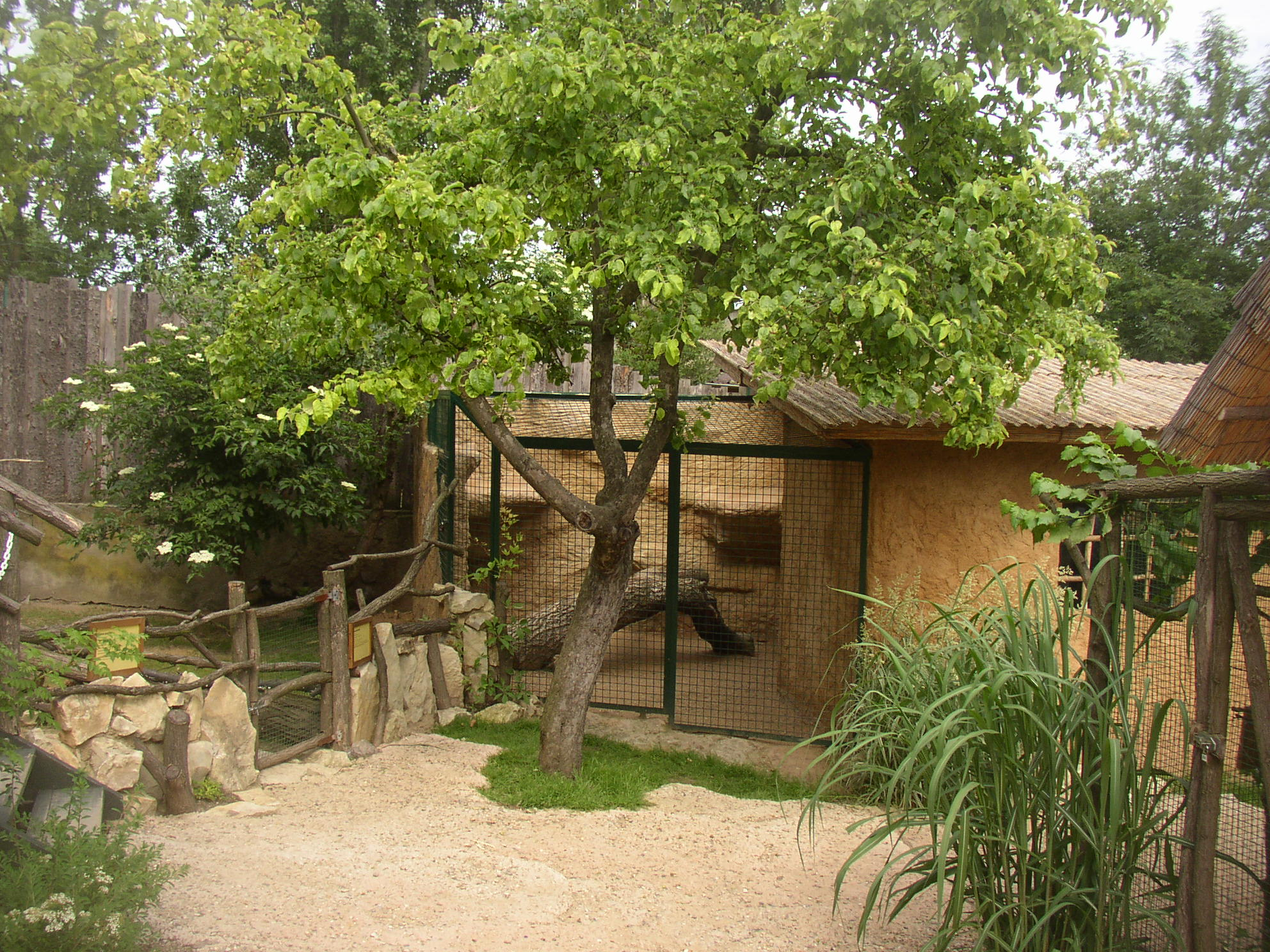

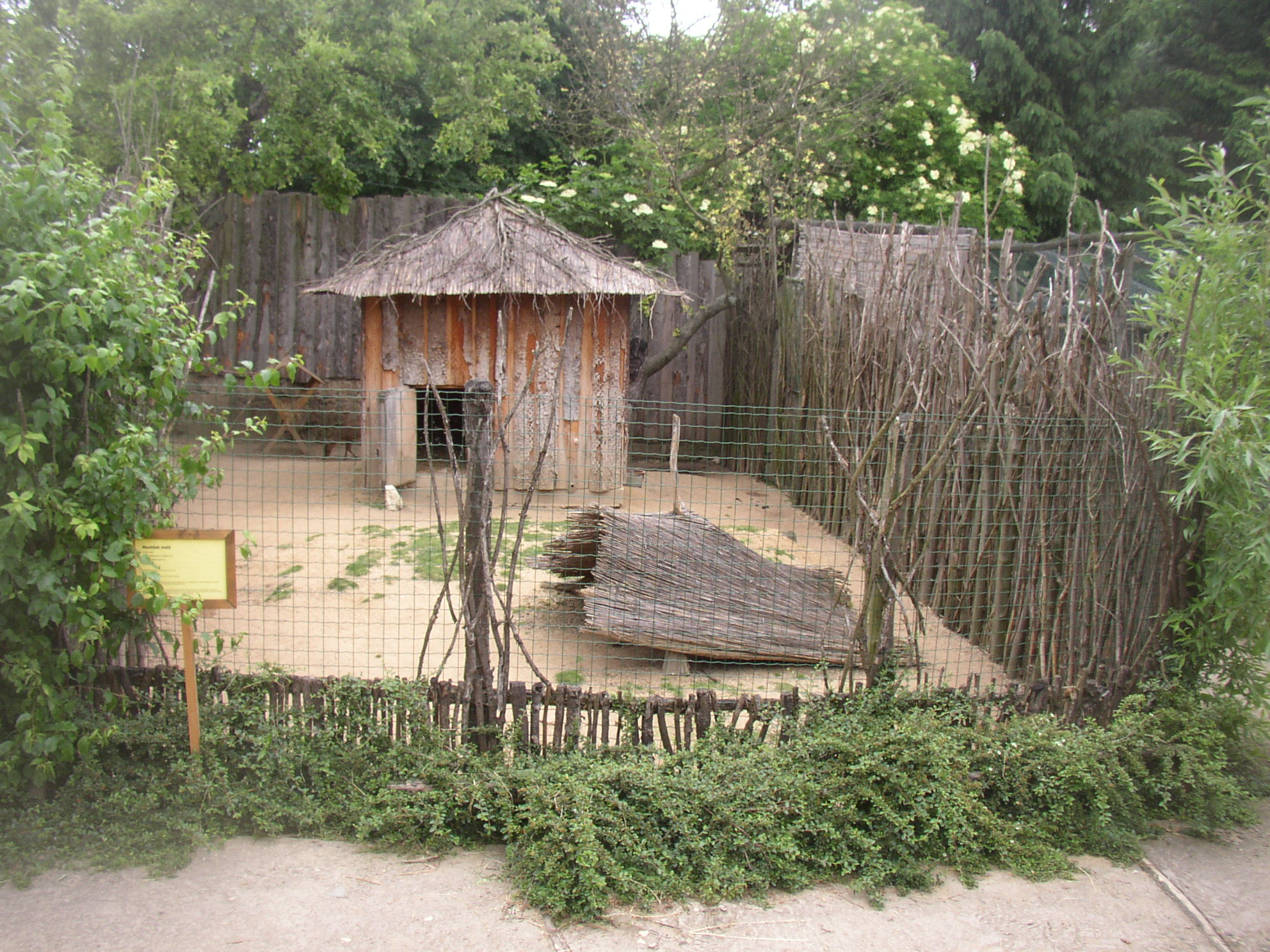

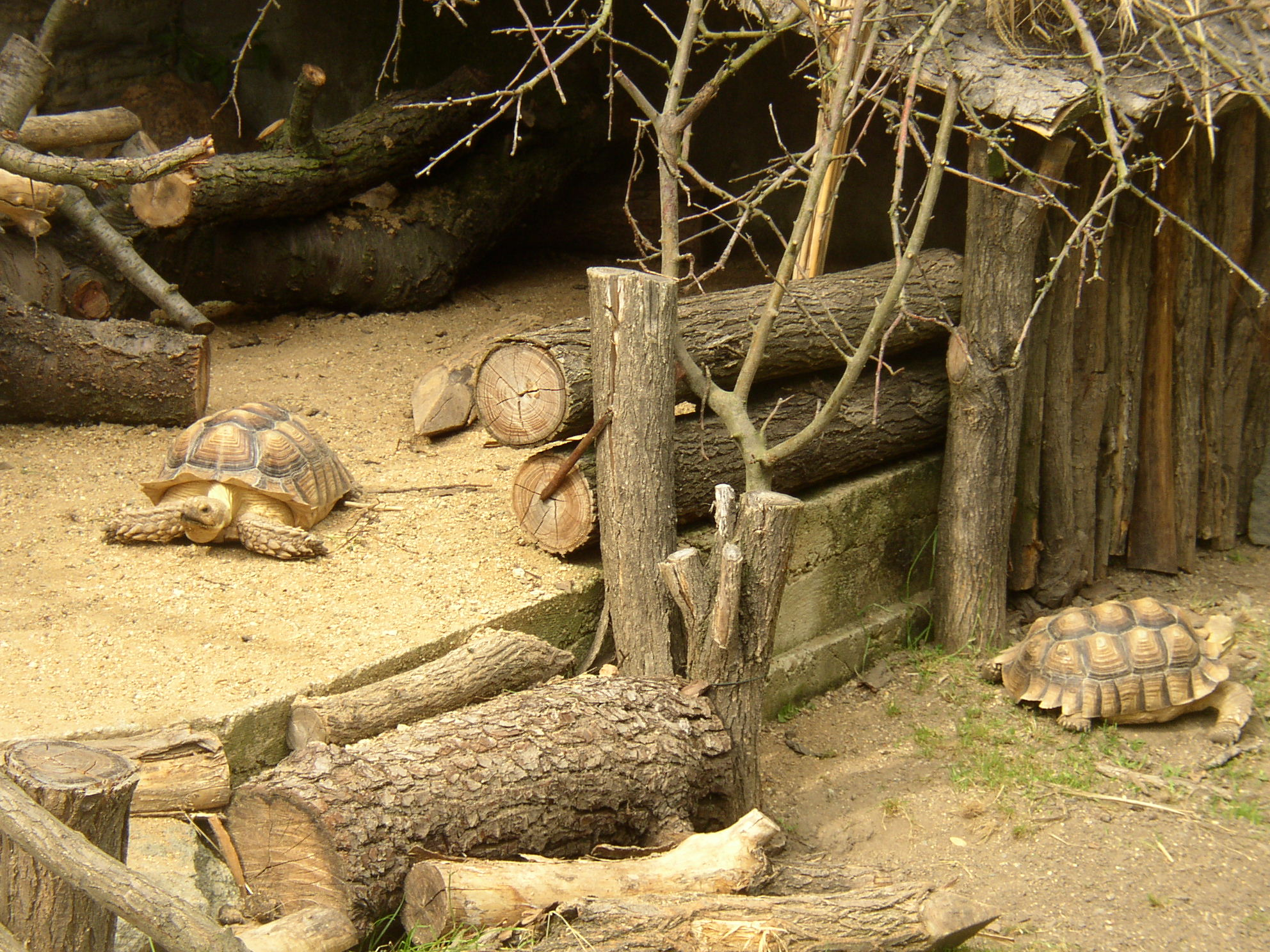

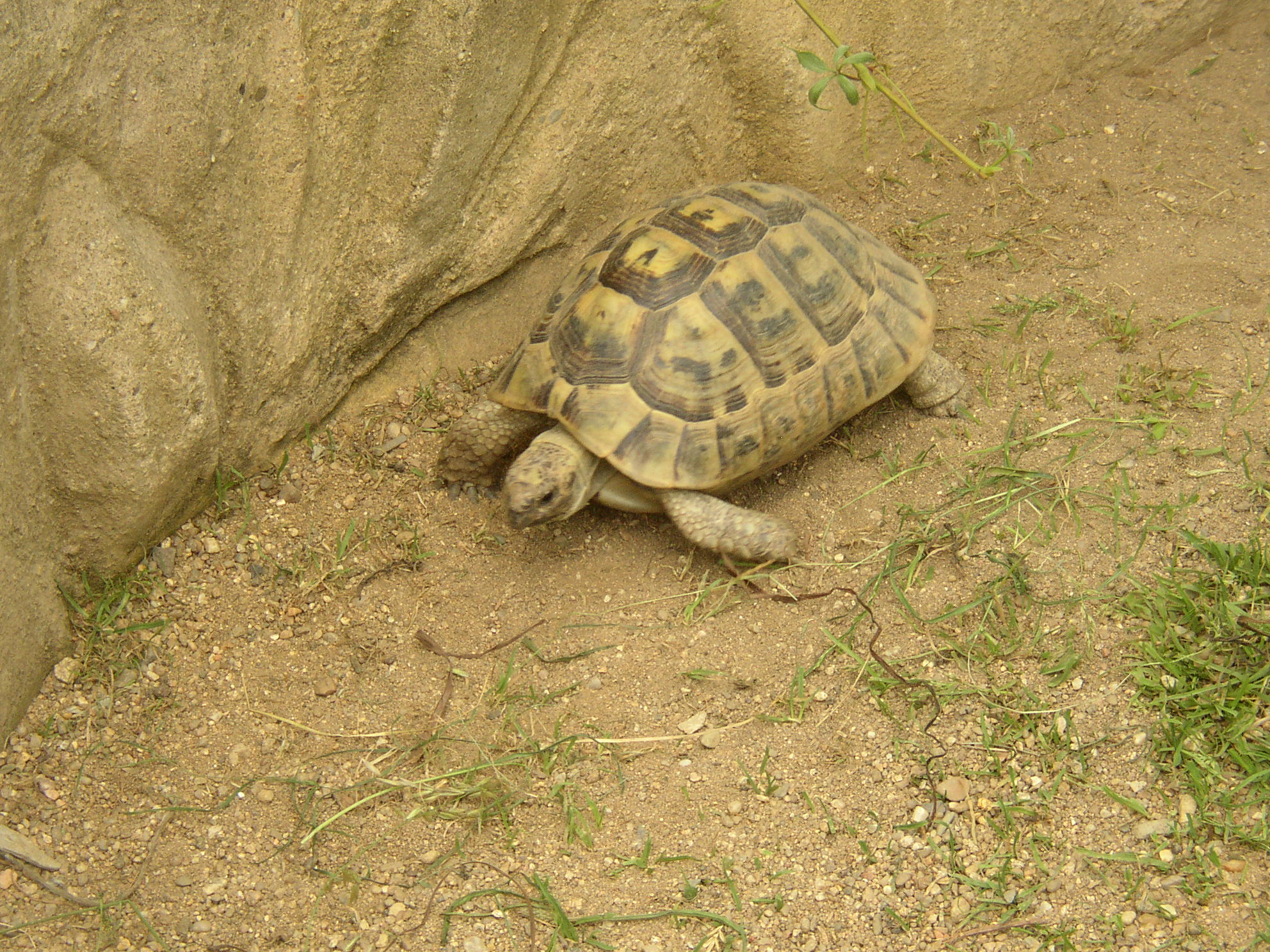

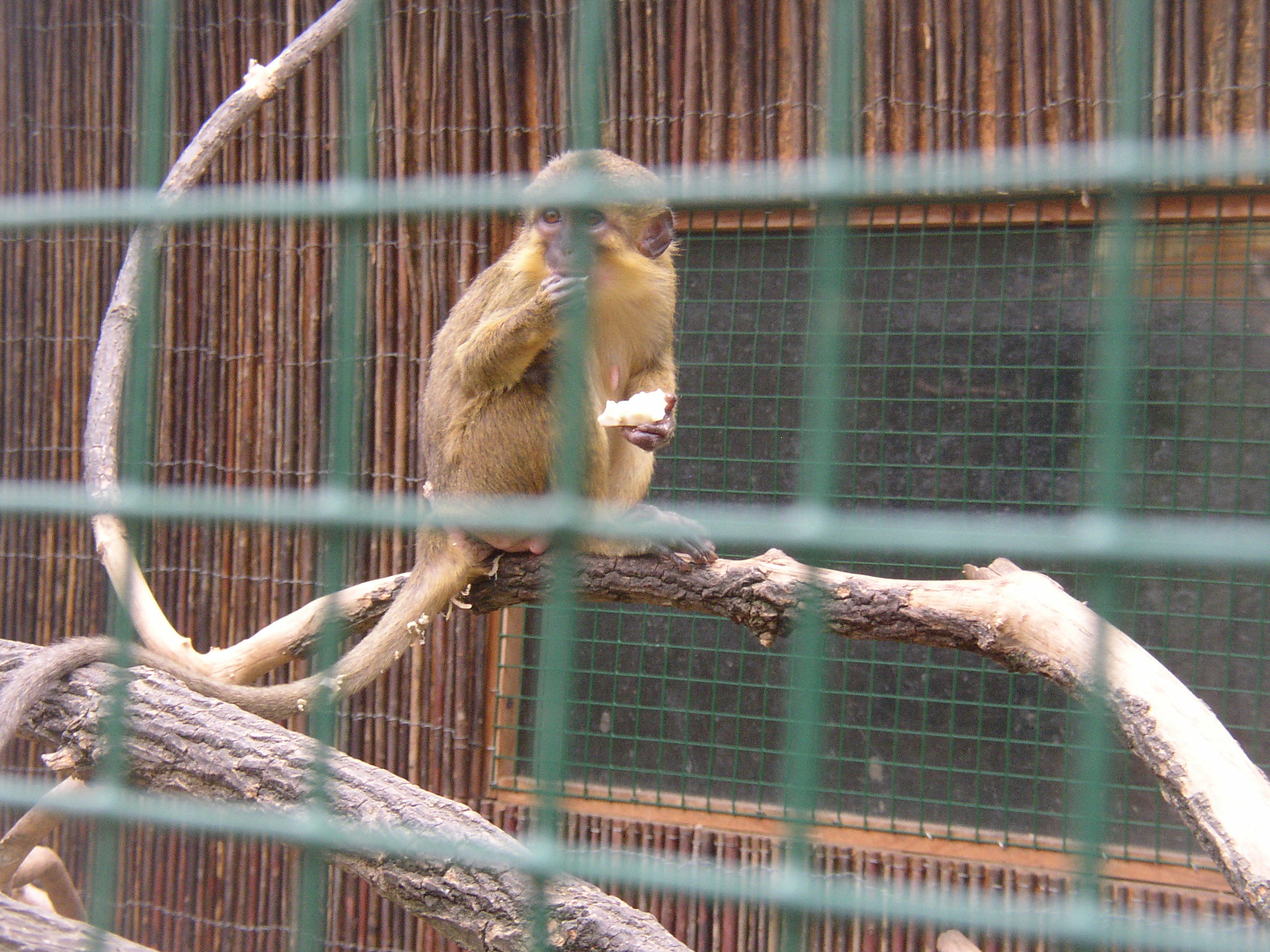

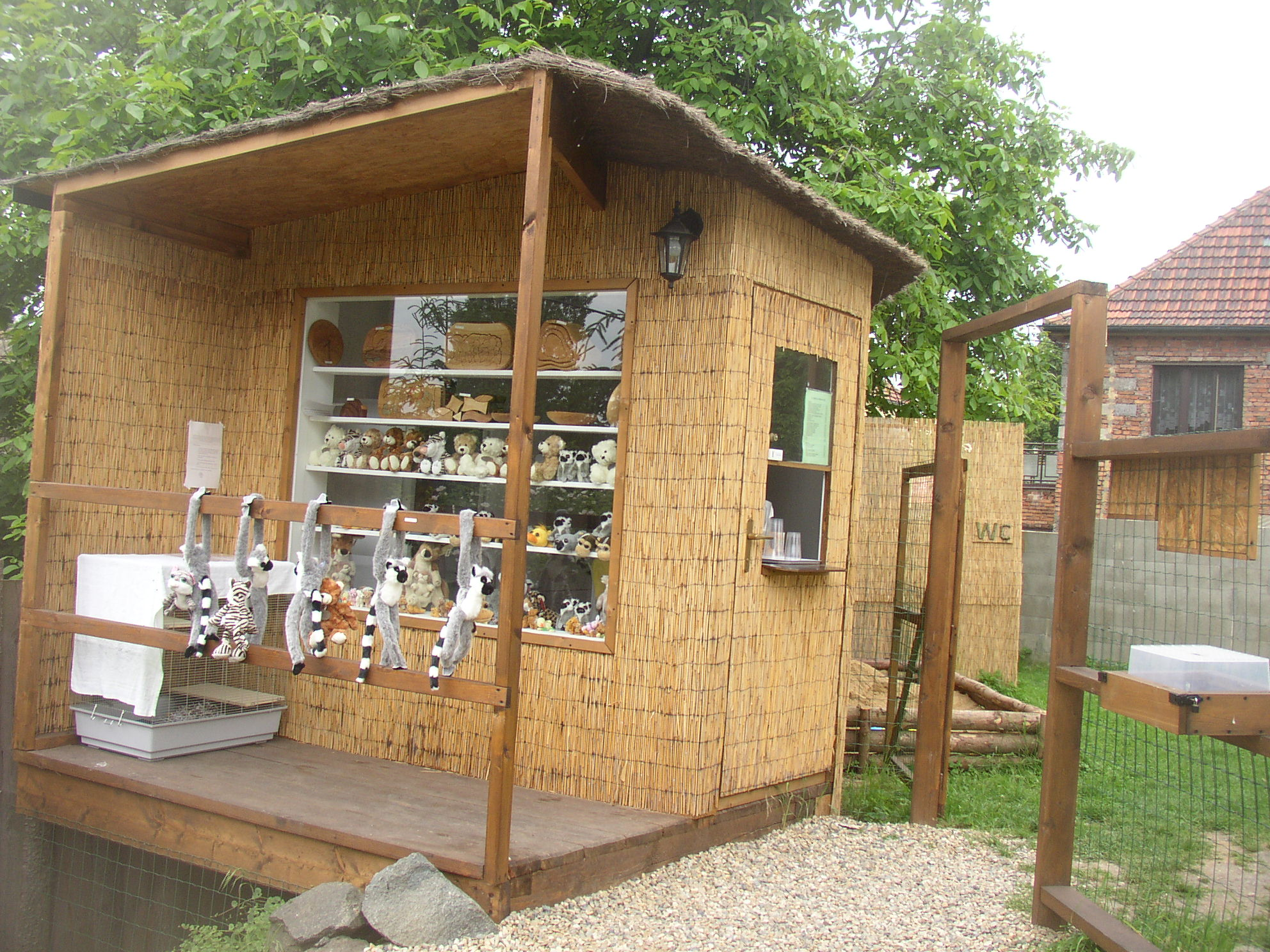
