= Oskořínek =

- Municipality
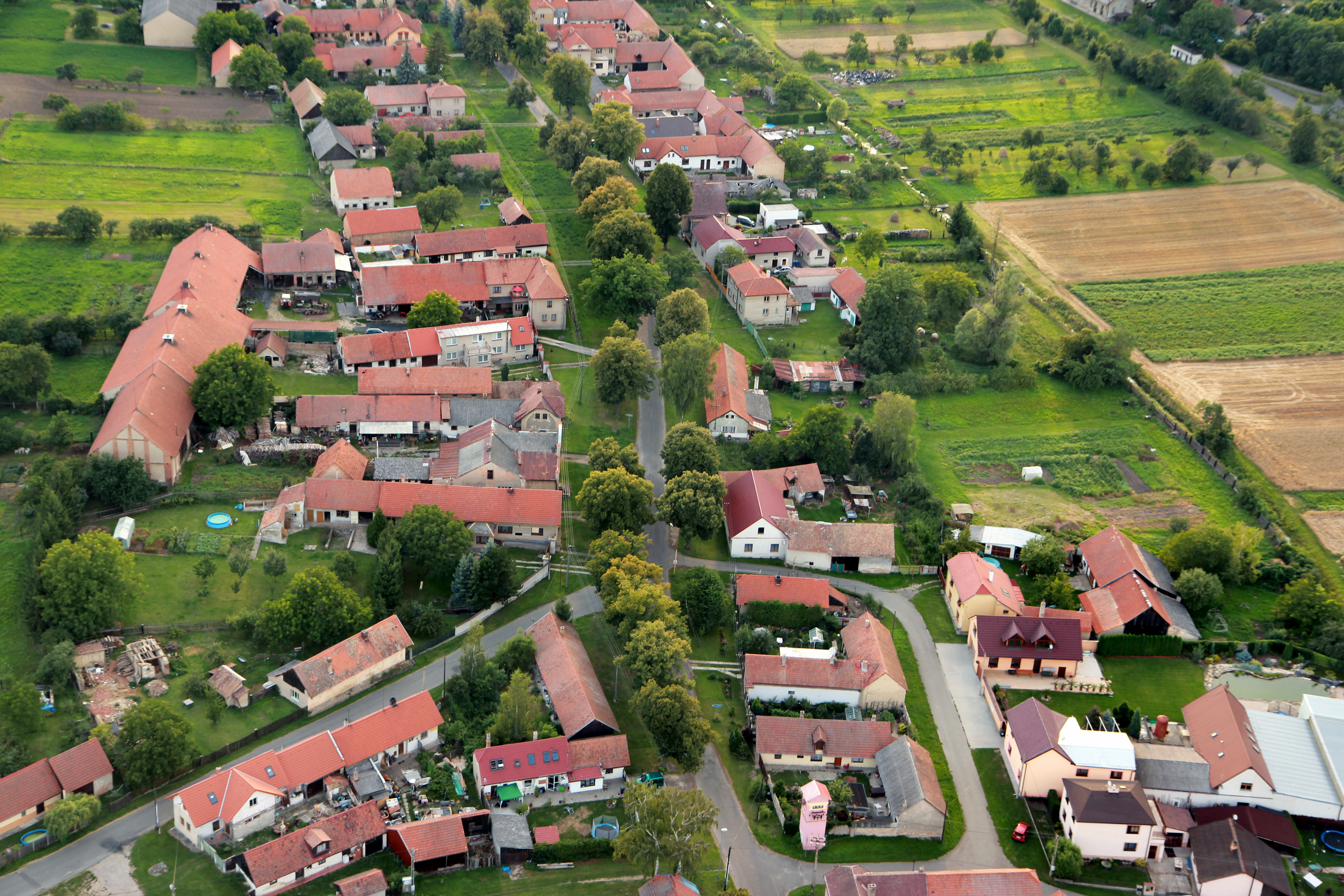
- Aerial view

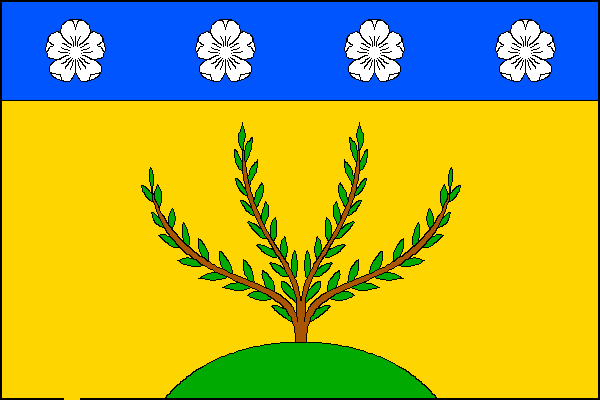
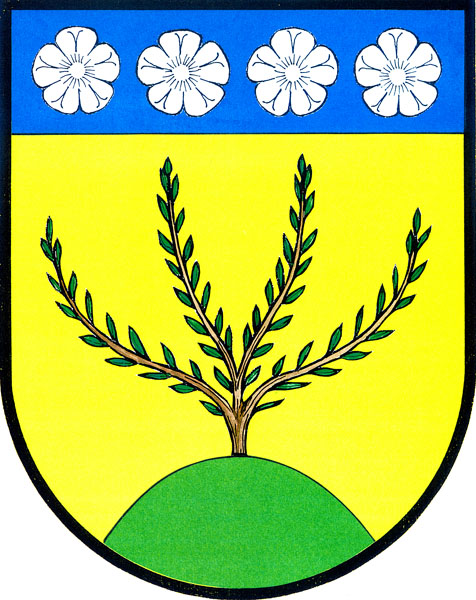
- Flag Coat of arms

- Location in the Czech Republic
- Coordinates: 50°14′24″N 15°5′3″E
- Country: Czech Republic
- Region: Central Bohemian
- District: Nymburk
- First mentioned: 1451

Area
  - Total: 5.61 km^{2} (2.17 sq mi)
- Elevation: 193 m (633 ft)

Population (2026-01-01)
  - Total: 566
  - Density: 101/km^{2} (261/sq mi)
- Time zone: UTC+1 (CET)
  - Summer (DST): UTC+2 (CEST)
- Postal code: 289 32
- Website: www.oskorinek.cz

Oskořínek is a municipality and village in Nymburk District in the Central Bohemian Region of the Czech Republic. It has about 600 inhabitants.

== Etymology ==
The name was derived either from the Czech word oskeruše (i.e. 'service tree'; in old Czech also oskoruše) or from the personal name Oskora, derived from the name of the tree. The initial name of the village was Oskořín. From the 16th century, the diminutive form Oskořínek is used.

== Geography ==
Oskořínek is located about 7 kilometres (4 mi) northeast of Nymburk and 42 km (26 mi) northeast of Prague. It lies in a flat agricultural landscape in the Central Elbe Table. The Ronovka Stream flows through the municipality.

== History ==
The first written mention of Oskořínek is from 1451. From the early 16th century, the village was owned by the Křinecký of Ronov family. In 1623, the Oskořínek estate was bought by Albrecht von Wallenstein, who soon left it to Adam von Waldstein in exchange for another estate. In 1652, Oskořínek was bought by the Wratislaw of Mitrovice family. The most important owners of Oskořínek were the Morzin family, who ruled the estate in 1689–1807. They had rebuilt the local castle and had built new houses and farm buildings.

== Demographics ==
Historical population

Year	Pop.	±%
1869	969	—
1880	1,074	+10.8%
1890	1,061	−1.2%
1900	830	−21.8%
1910	827	−0.4%

Year	Pop.	±%
1921	876	+5.9%
1930	764	−12.8%
1950	710	−7.1%
1961	703	−1.0%
1970	650	−7.5%

Year	Pop.	±%
1980	611	−6.0%
1991	540	−11.6%
2001	511	−5.4%
2011	535	+4.7%
2021	533	−0.4%

Source: Censuses

== Transport ==
Oskořínek is located on the railway line Jičín–Nymburk.

== Sights ==
The only protected cultural monuments in the municipality are the statues of St. John of Nepomuk and Immaculate Virgin Mary, both dating from the 18th century.
