= Bošovice =

- Municipality
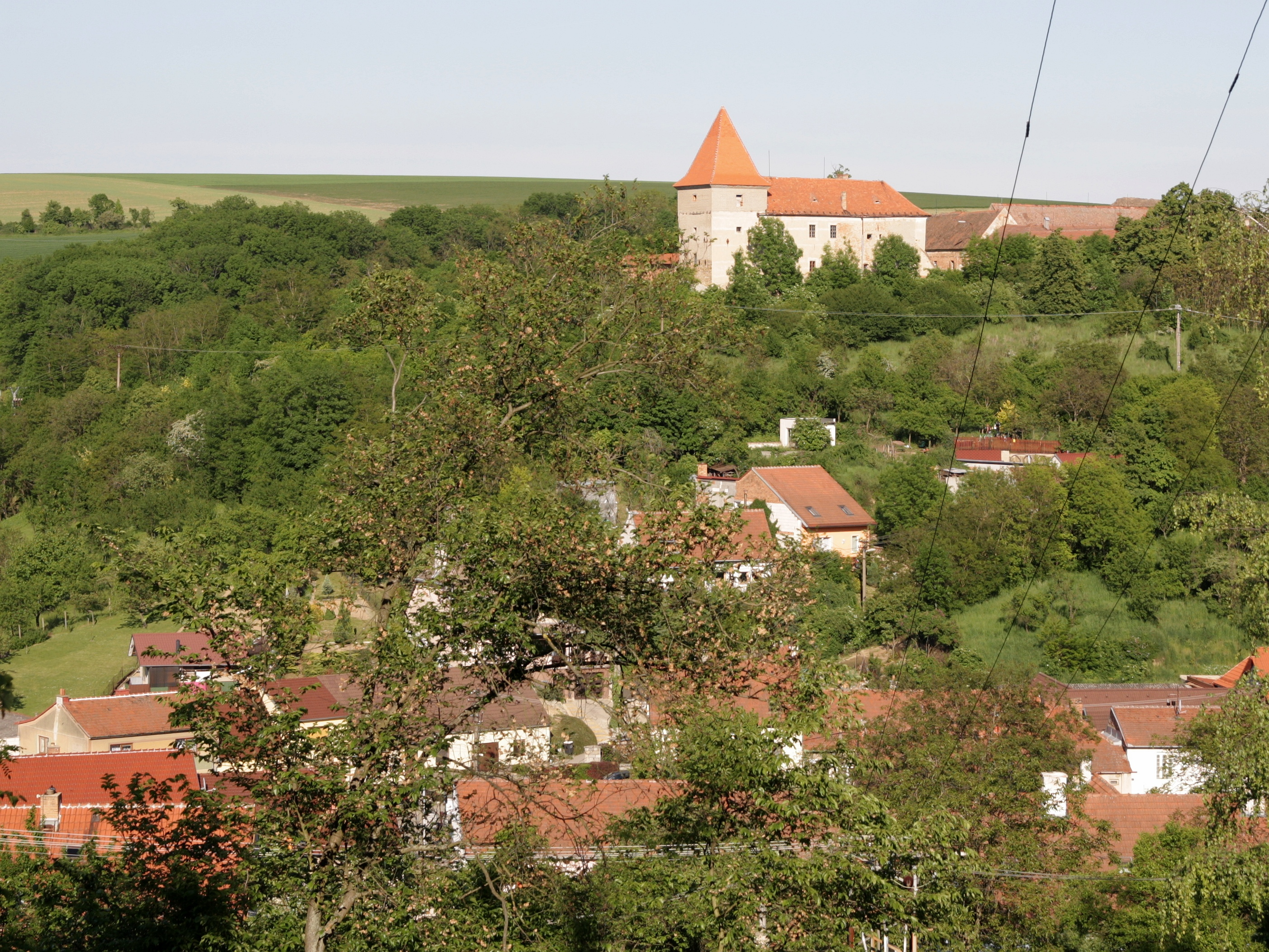
- Centre of Bošovice below the Bošovice Fortress

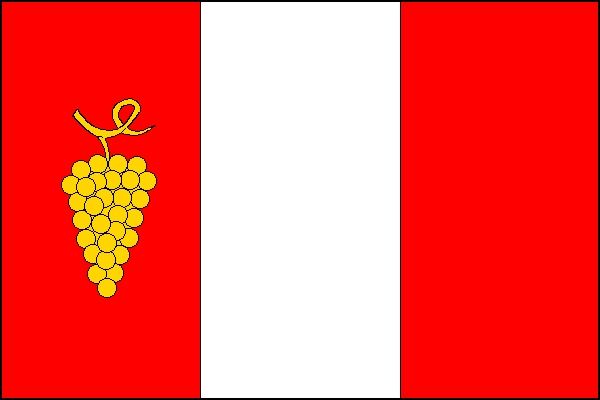
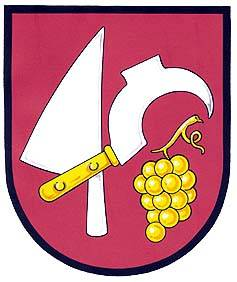
- Flag Coat of arms

- Location in the Czech Republic
- Coordinates: 49°3′13″N 16°50′12″E
- Country: Czech Republic
- Region: South Moravian
- District: Vyškov
- First mentioned: 1141

Area
  - Total: 12.88 km^{2} (4.97 sq mi)
- Elevation: 270 m (890 ft)

Population (2026-01-01)
  - Total: 1,258
  - Density: 97.67/km^{2} (253.0/sq mi)
- Time zone: UTC+1 (CET)
  - Summer (DST): UTC+2 (CEST)
- Postal code: 683 55
- Website: www.obec-bosovice.cz

Bošovice is a municipality and village in Vyškov District in the South Moravian Region of the Czech Republic. It has about 1,300 inhabitants.

Bošovice lies approximately 27 kilometres (17 mi) south-west of Vyškov, 23 km (14 mi) south-east of Brno, and 209 km (130 mi) south-east of Prague.

== Demographics ==
Historical population
| Year | Pop. | ±% |
|---|---|---|
| 1869 | 904 | — |
| 1880 | 987 | +9.2% |
| 1890 | 946 | −4.2% |
| 1900 | 981 | +3.7% |
| 1910 | 1,074 | +9.5% |
| 1921 | 1,121 | +4.4% |
| 1930 | 1,207 | +7.7% |
| 1950 | 1,131 | −6.3% |
| 1961 | 1,201 | +6.2% |
| 1970 | 1,105 | −8.0% |
| 1980 | 1,095 | −0.9% |
| 1991 | 1,067 | −2.6% |
| 2001 | 1,073 | +0.6% |
| 2011 | 1,161 | +8.2% |
| 2021 | 1,239 | +6.7% |
Source: Censuses
