= Zájezd =

- Municipality
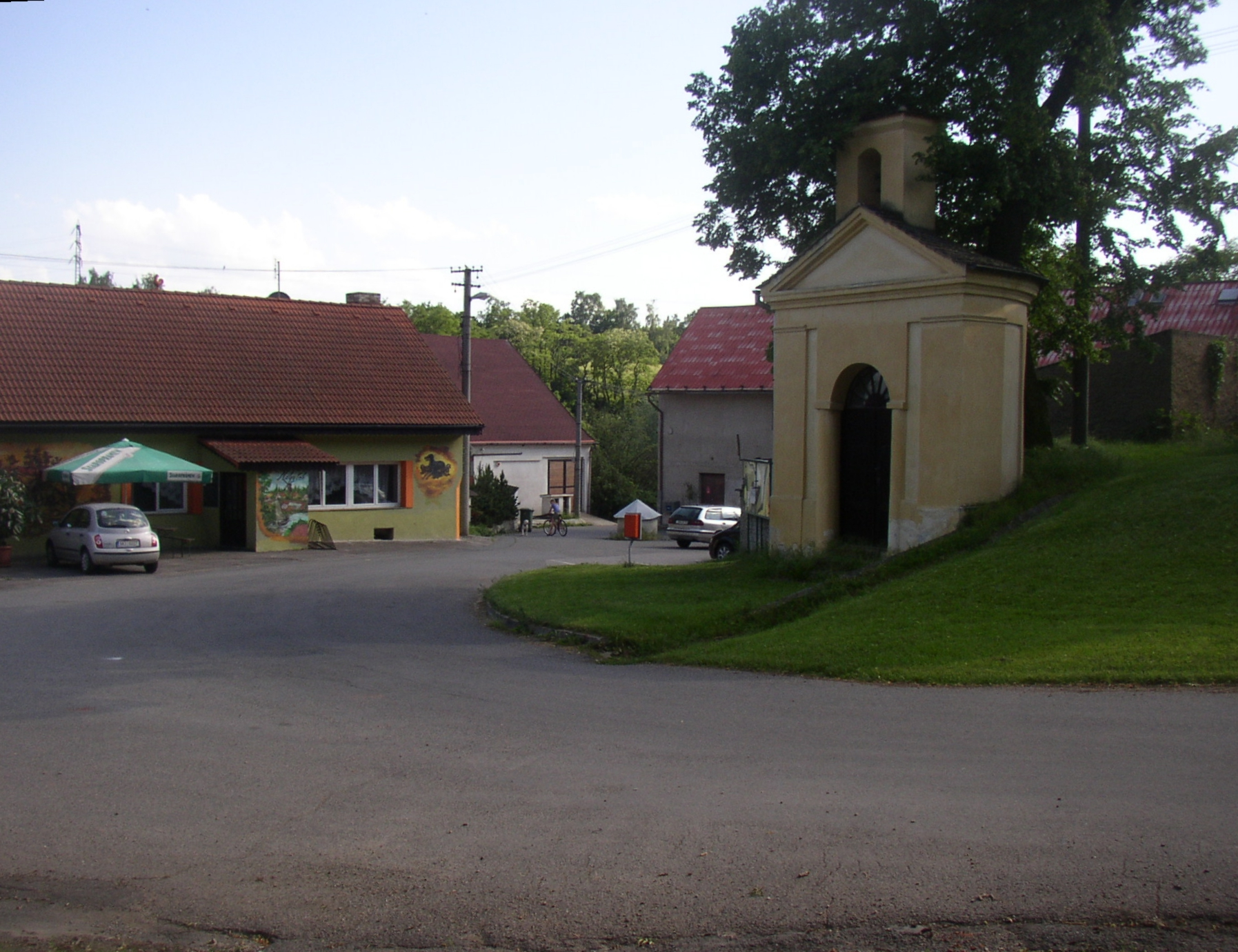
- Centre of Zájezd with a chapel

- Flag Coat of arms

- Location in the Czech Republic
- Coordinates: 50°9′58″N 14°13′14″E
- Country: Czech Republic
- Region: Central Bohemian
- District: Kladno
- First mentioned: 1316

Area
  - Total: 2.11 km^{2} (0.81 sq mi)
- Elevation: 285 m (935 ft)

Population (2026-01-01)
  - Total: 152
  - Density: 72.0/km^{2} (187/sq mi)
- Time zone: UTC+1 (CET)
  - Summer (DST): UTC+2 (CEST)
- Postal code: 273 43
- Website: obeczajezd.cz

Zájezd is a municipality and village in Kladno District in the Central Bohemian Region of the Czech Republic. It has about 200 inhabitants.

== Administrative division ==
Zájezd consists of two municipal parts (in brackets population according to the 2021 census):

- Zájezd (110)
- Bůhzdař (22)

== Demographics ==
Historical population
Year	Pop.	±%
1869	239	—
1880	242	+1.3%
1890	235	−2.9%
1900	298	+26.8%
1910	361	+21.1%
1921	331	−8.3%
1930	298	−10.0%
1950	209	−29.9%
1961	156	−25.4%
1970	139	−10.9%
1980	111	−20.1%
1991	112	+0.9%
2001	97	−13.4%
2011	119	+22.7%
2021	132	+10.9%
Source: Censuses

== Sights ==
Zájezd is known for the Zájezd Zoo.
