= Chleby (Nymburk District) =

- Municipality
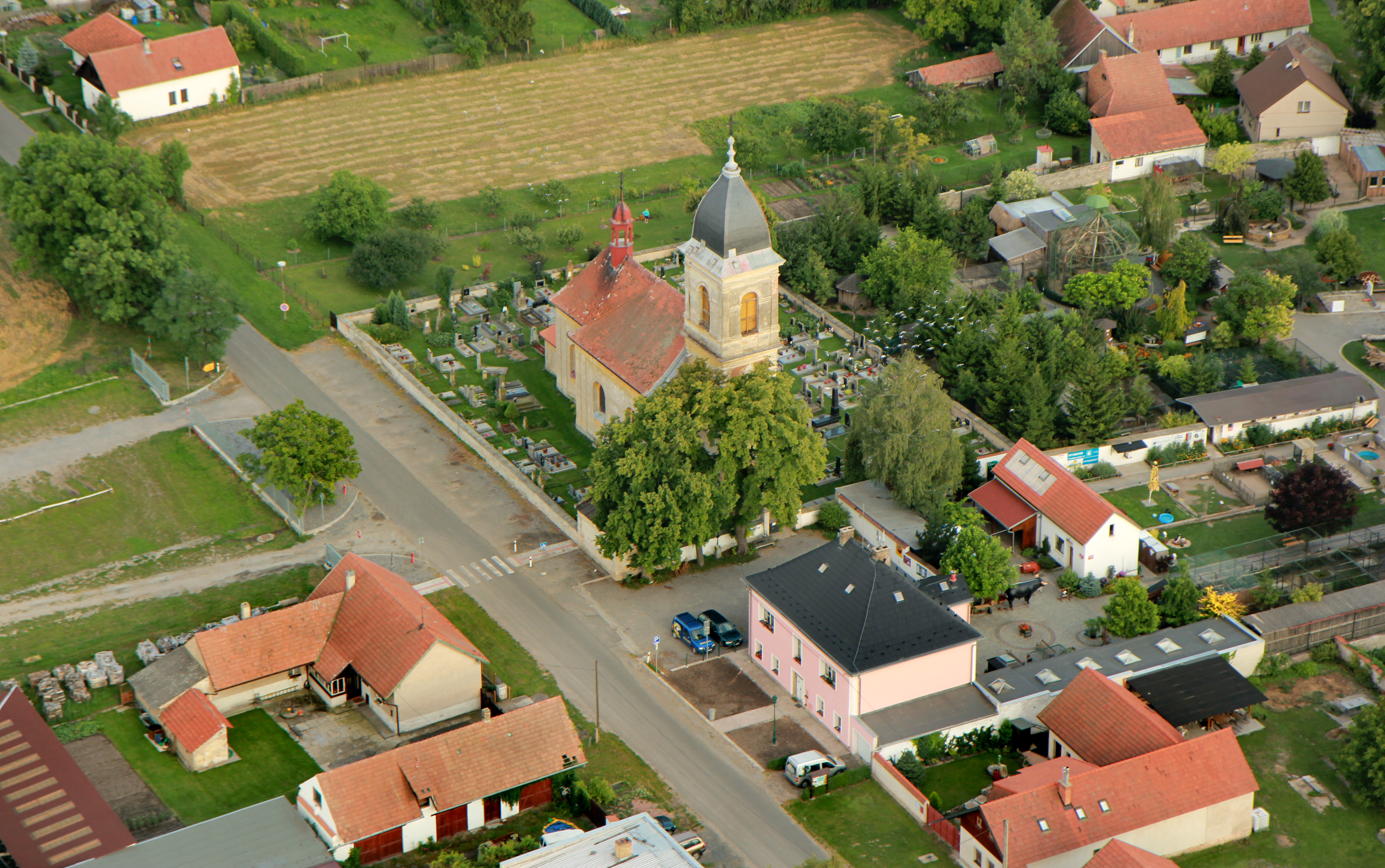
- Aerial view of the centre of Chleby

- Flag Coat of arms

- Location in the Czech Republic
- Coordinates: 50°13′22″N 15°5′22″E
- Country: Czech Republic
- Region: Central Bohemian
- District: Nymburk
- First mentioned: 1292

Area
  - Total: 9.59 km^{2} (3.70 sq mi)
- Elevation: 193 m (633 ft)

Population (2026-01-01)
  - Total: 459
  - Density: 47.9/km^{2} (124/sq mi)
- Time zone: UTC+1 (CET)
  - Summer (DST): UTC+2 (CEST)
- Postal code: 289 31
- Website: www.chleby.cz

Chleby is a municipality and village in Nymburk District in the Central Bohemian Region of the Czech Republic. It has about 500 inhabitants.

== Administrative division ==
Chleby consists of two municipal parts (in brackets population according to the 2021 census):

- Chleby (407)
- Draho (42)

== Etymology ==
The word chleby means 'breads' in modern Czech, but this is just a coincidence. The name of the village is derived from the personal name Chleb, meaning "Chlebs (Chleb's family)".

== Geography ==
Chleby is located about 5 kilometres (3 mi) northeast of Nymburk and 41 km (25 mi) east of Prague. It lies in a flat agricultural landscape in the Central Elbe Table.

== History ==
The first written mention of Chleby is from 1292, when the monastery in Mnichovo Hradiště sold the village to the Sedlec Abbey.

== Demographics ==
Historical population

| Year | Pop. | ±% |
|---|---|---|
| 1869 | 677 | — |
| 1880 | 664 | −1.9% |
| 1890 | 716 | +7.8% |
| 1900 | 760 | +6.1% |
| 1910 | 679 | −10.7% |

| Year | Pop. | ±% |
|---|---|---|
| 1921 | 707 | +4.1% |
| 1930 | 708 | +0.1% |
| 1950 | 499 | −29.5% |
| 1961 | 503 | +0.8% |
| 1970 | 462 | −8.2% |

| Year | Pop. | ±% |
|---|---|---|
| 1980 | 399 | −13.6% |
| 1991 | 326 | −18.3% |
| 2001 | 339 | +4.0% |
| 2011 | 418 | +23.3% |
| 2021 | 449 | +7.4% |

Source: Censuses

== Transport ==
The northern part of the territory of Chleby is briefly crossed by the Jičín–Nymburk railway line, but there is no train station. The municipality is served by the station in neighbouring Oskořínek.

== Sights ==
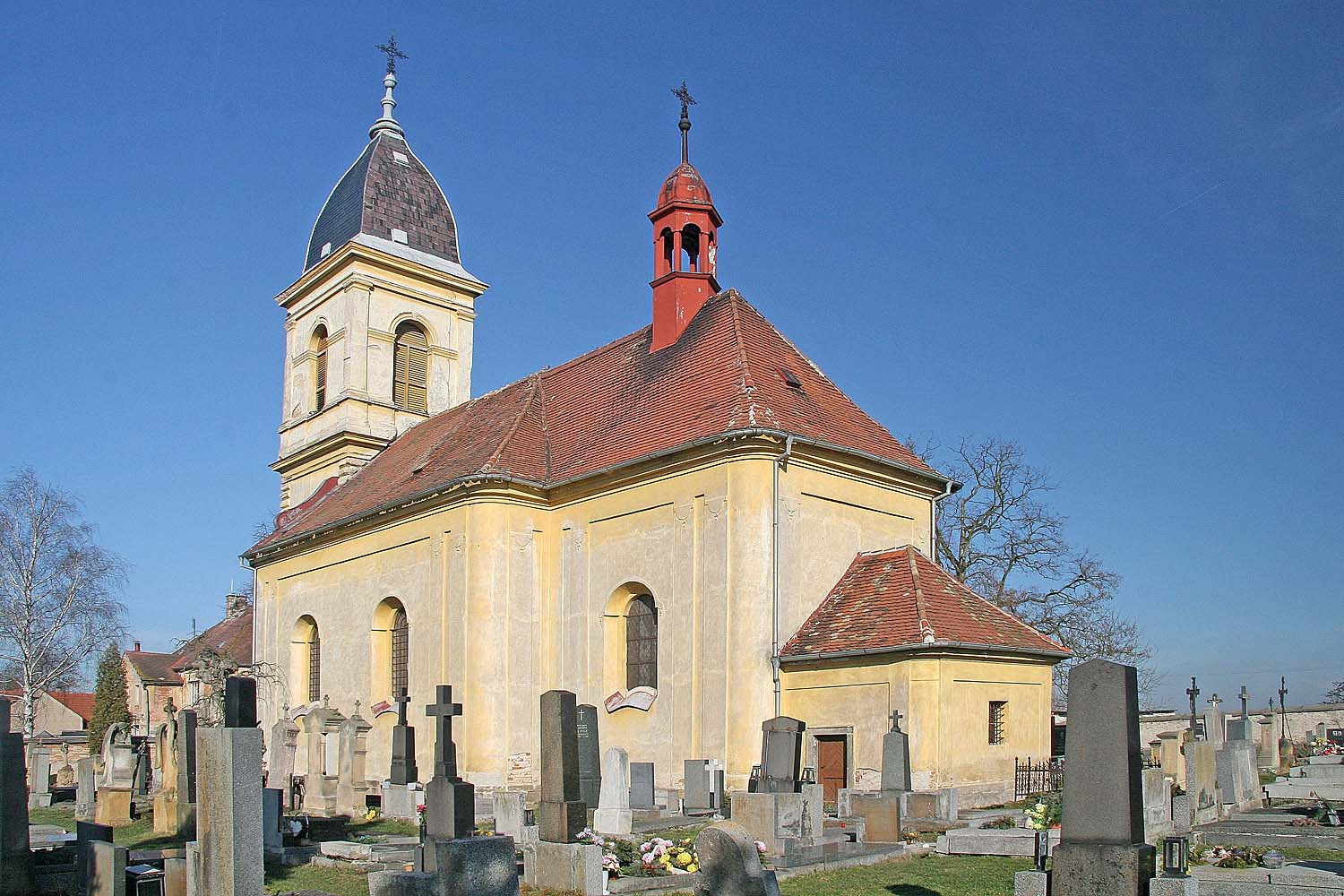
Church of Saint Lawrence

The main landmark of Chleby is the Church of Saint Lawrence. It was built in the late Baroque style in 1780–1782 and the tower was added in the mid-19th century.

The Evangelical church was built in the Neo-Romanesque style in 1885–1888, after the old one was demolished.

Chleby is known for the Chleby Zoo, one of the smallest zoos in the country.
