= Chleby Zoo =

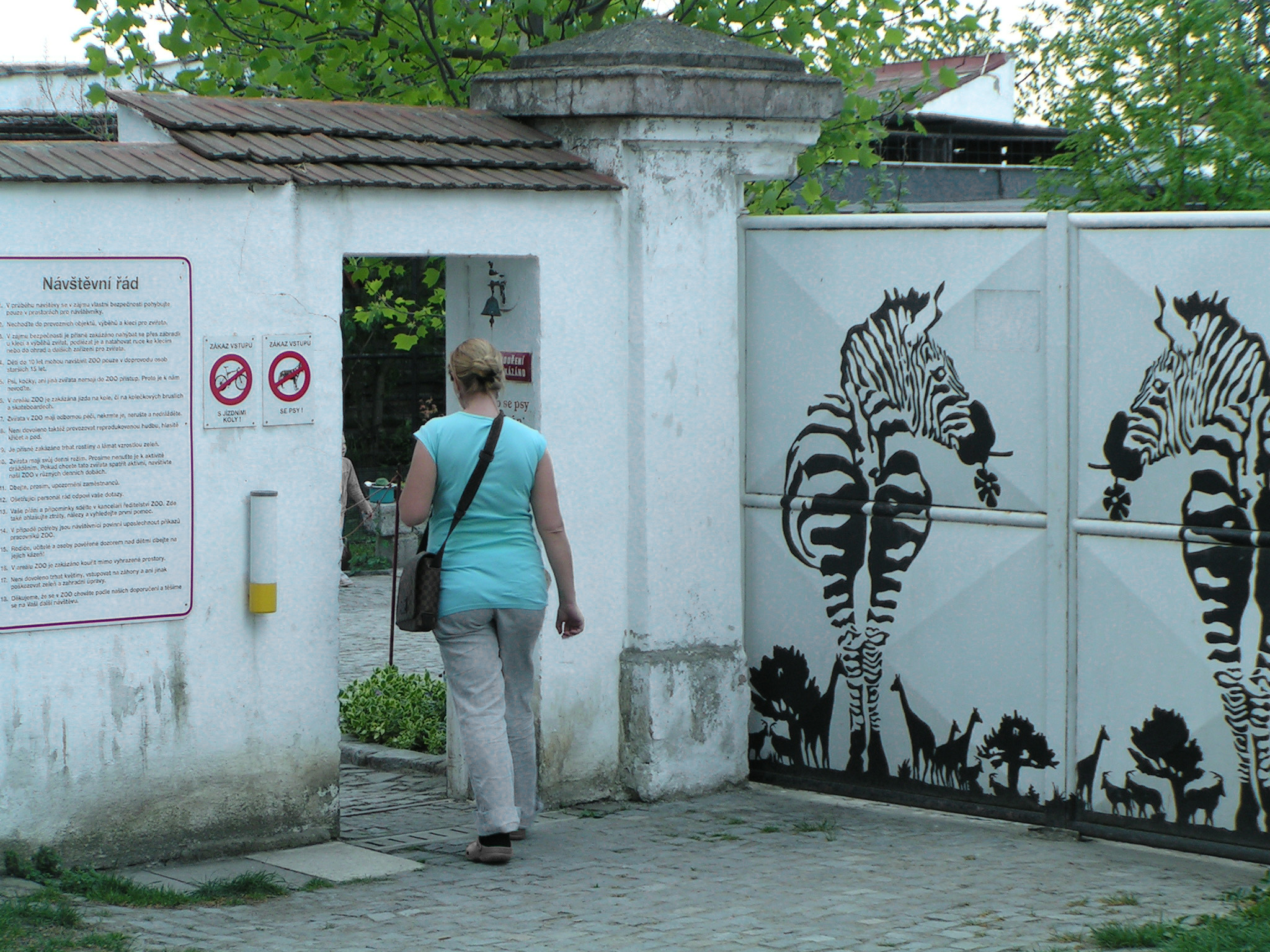
- Entrance
- Interactive map of Chleby Zoo
- 50°13′21″N 15°05′30″E
- Date opened: 1997
- Location: Václava Otty 1, Chleby
- Land area: 4.4 hectares
- No. of animals: 140
- No. of species: 50
- Memberships: EARAZA
- Website: http://www.zoochleby.cz

Chleby Zoo (officially Zoologická zahrada Chleby) is a zoo in Chleby in the Central Bohemian Region of the Czech Republic. It is located close to the town of Nymburk.

With an area of only 0.8 hectares belonged among the smallest in the country, but in 2008 3.6 hectares was added, when the zoo bought land just across the road of the zoo. In 2008 was started a giant freshwater aquarium called the Pavilion of the Elbe.
