= Horní Pěna =

- Municipality
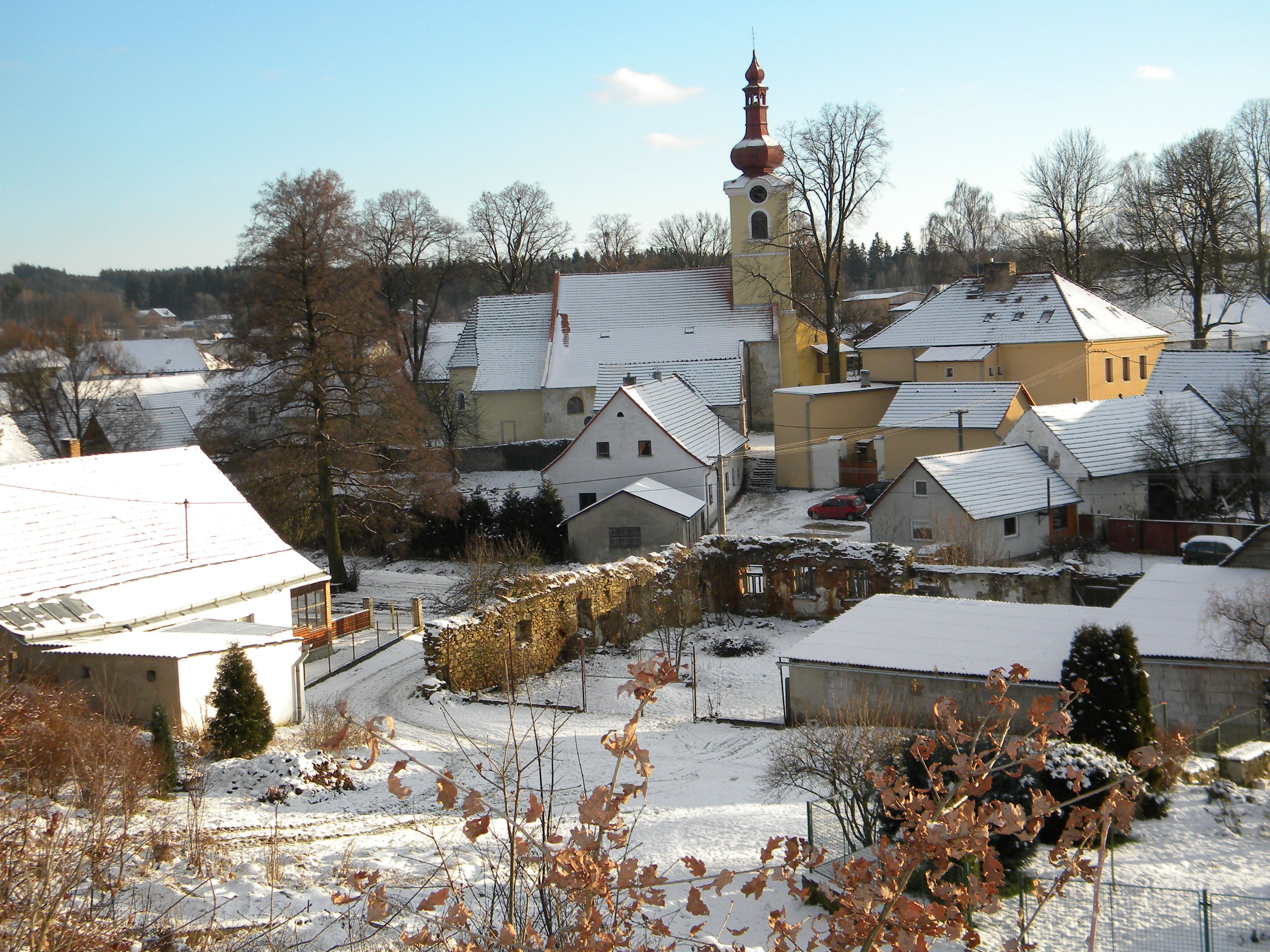
- View towards the Church of Saint Michael

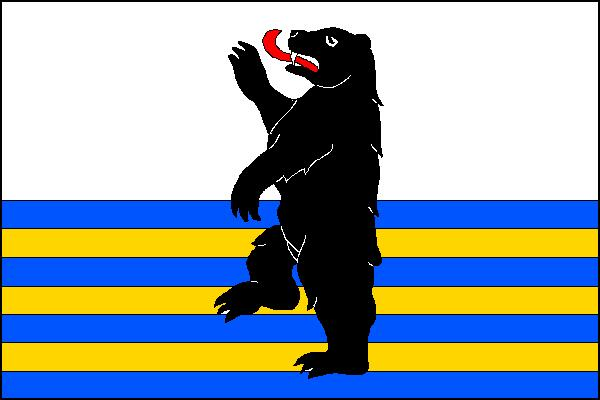
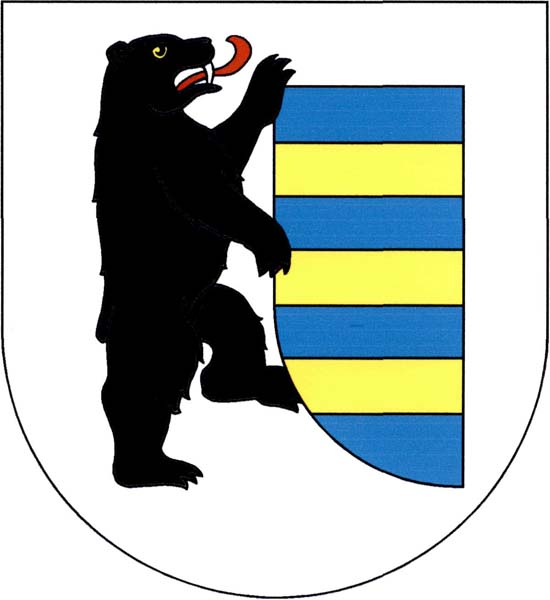
- Flag Coat of arms

- Location in the Czech Republic
- Coordinates: 49°6′16″N 15°2′32″E
- Country: Czech Republic
- Region: South Bohemian
- District: Jindřichův Hradec
- First mentioned: 1354

Area
  - Total: 14.85 km^{2} (5.73 sq mi)
- Elevation: 496 m (1,627 ft)

Population (2026-01-01)
  - Total: 589
  - Density: 39.7/km^{2} (103/sq mi)
- Time zone: UTC+1 (CET)
  - Summer (DST): UTC+2 (CEST)
- Postal codes: 377 01, 378 31
- Website: www.hornipena.cz

Horní Pěna (German: Oberbaumgarten) is a municipality and village in Jindřichův Hradec District in the South Bohemian Region of the Czech Republic. It has about 600 inhabitants. The village of Malíkov nad Nežárkou within the municipality is well preserved and is protected as a village monument zone.

== Administrative division ==
Horní Pěna consists of two municipal parts (in brackets population according to the 2021 census):

- Horní Pěna (446)
- Malíkov nad Nežárkou (99)

== Etymology ==
The name Pěna means 'foam' in Czech. The initial name of the village was Pěnná (an adjective from pěna) and the name referred to the foaming water in the local stream. In the mid-17th century at the latest, two villages began to be distinguished: Horní Pěna ('upper Pěna') and Dolní Pěna ('lower Pěna').

== Geography ==
Horní Pěna is located about 5 kilometres (3 mi) south of Jindřichův Hradec and 42 km (26 mi) northeast of České Budějovice. It lies in the Javořice Highlands. The highest point is at 596 metres (1,955 ft) above sea level. The stream Pěnenský potok flows through the municipality. In addition to several small fishponds, there is the fishpond Pěněnský rybník with an area of 75 ha (190 acres).

== History ==
The first written mention of Horní Pěna is from 1354. It was an agricultural village, later weaving and brick production developed. At the time of its establishment, the village was ethnically Czech, but gradually became predominantly German-speaking. From 1938 to 1945, Horní Pěna was annexed by Nazi Germany and administered as part of the Reichsgau Niederdonau. After World War II, the German population was expelled and the village was repopulated by Czechs.

== Demographics ==
Historical population

Year	Pop.	±%
1869	1,034	—
1880	997	−3.6%
1890	941	−5.6%
1900	848	−9.9%
1910	836	−1.4%

Year	Pop.	±%
1921	782	−6.5%
1930	720	−7.9%
1950	614	−14.7%
1961	608	−1.0%
1970	534	−12.2%

Year	Pop.	±%
1980	508	−4.9%
1991	456	−10.2%
2001	474	+3.9%
2011	568	+19.8%
2021	545	−4.0%

Source: Censuses

== Transport ==
The I/34 road (part of the European route E551; the section from České Budějovice to Jindřichův Hradec) briefly crosses the municipality in the west.

== Sights ==
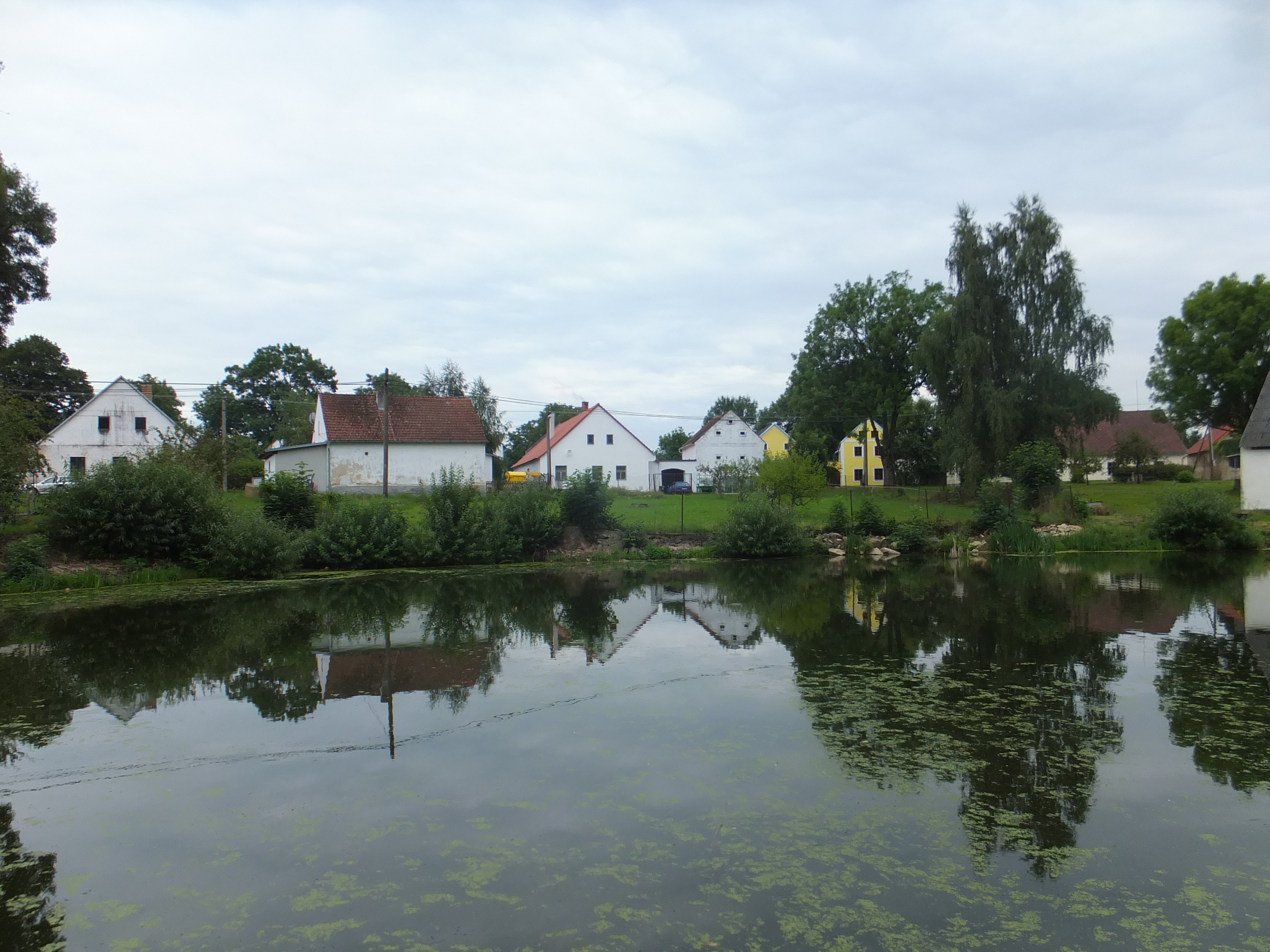
Malíkov nad Nežárkou

The main landmark of Horní Pěna is the Church of Saint Michael. It was built in the Gothic style in the first quarter of the 14th century and modified in the Baroque style in the 17th and 18th centuries. The tower was added in 1709.

In Horní Pěna is the Zoo Na Hrádečku, a small zoo with more than 100 species on an area of 10 hectares (25 acres).

Malíkov nad Nežárkou is a village with well-preserved typical South Bohemian folk architecture, protected as a village monument zone. In the centre of the village is the Chapel of Our Lady of Loreto. It was built in 1849.
