= Hamerský potok (Nežárka) =

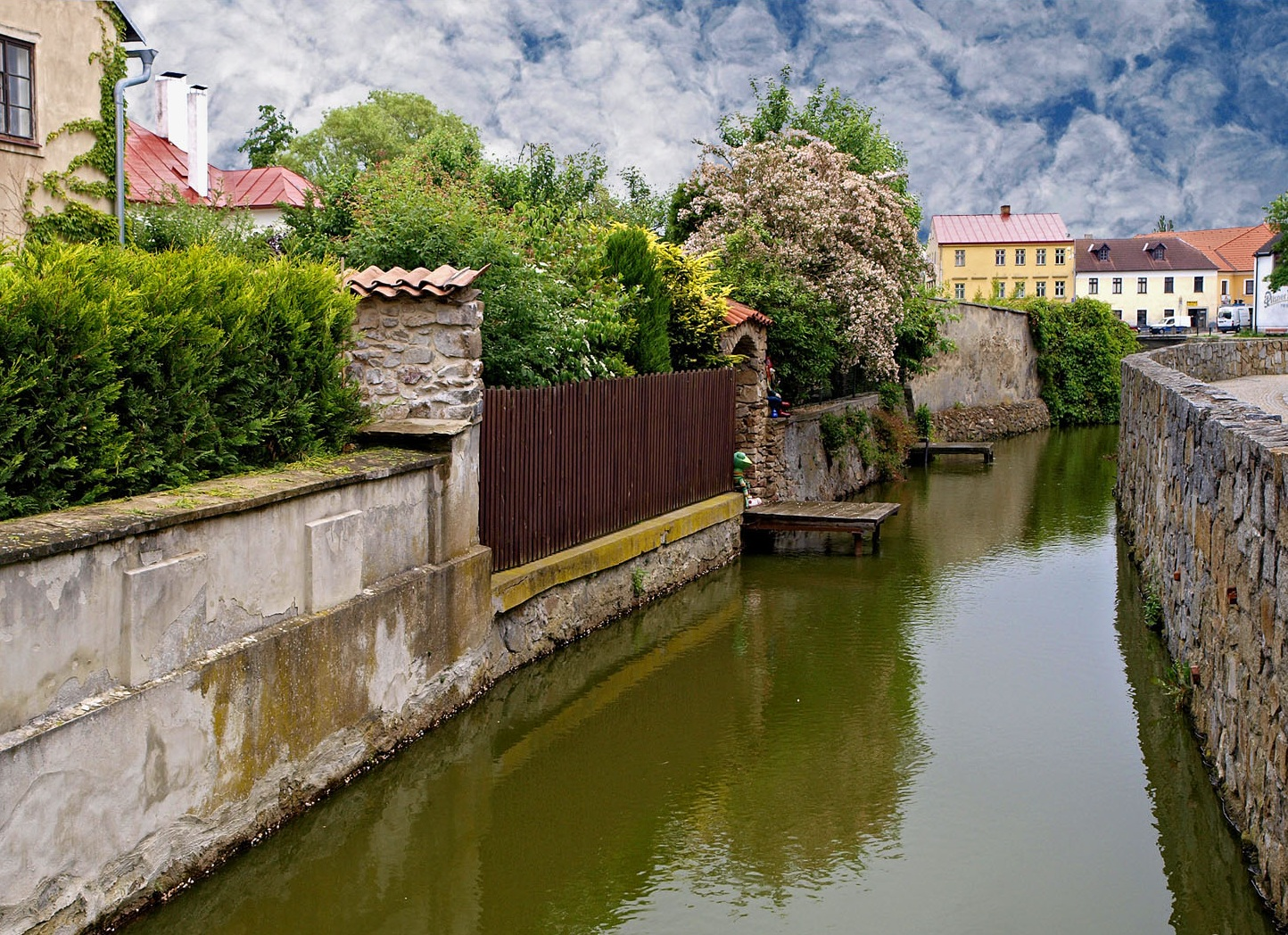
- The Hamerský potok in Jindřichův Hradec

Location
- Country: Czech Republic
- Regions: South Bohemian; Vysočina

Physical characteristics
- Source
  - location: Horní Dubenky, Javořice Highlands
  - coordinates: 49°15′5″N 15°20′26″E
  - elevation: 757 m (2,484 ft)
- Mouth
  - location: Nežárka
  - coordinates: 49°8′25″N 14°59′58″E
  - elevation: 455 m (1,493 ft)
- Length: 46.3 km (28.8 mi)
- Basin size: 221.5 km^{2} (85.5 sq mi)
- Discharge
  - average: 1.33 m^{3}/s (47 cu ft/s) in Blažejov

Basin features
- Progression: Nežárka→ Lužnice→ Vltava→ Elbe→ North Sea

The Hamerský potok is a stream in the Czech Republic, a left tributary of the Nežárka River. It flows through the South Bohemian and Vysočina regions. It is 46.3 km (28.8 mi) long.

== Etymology ==
The name means 'hammer mill stream' in Czech.

== Characteristic ==
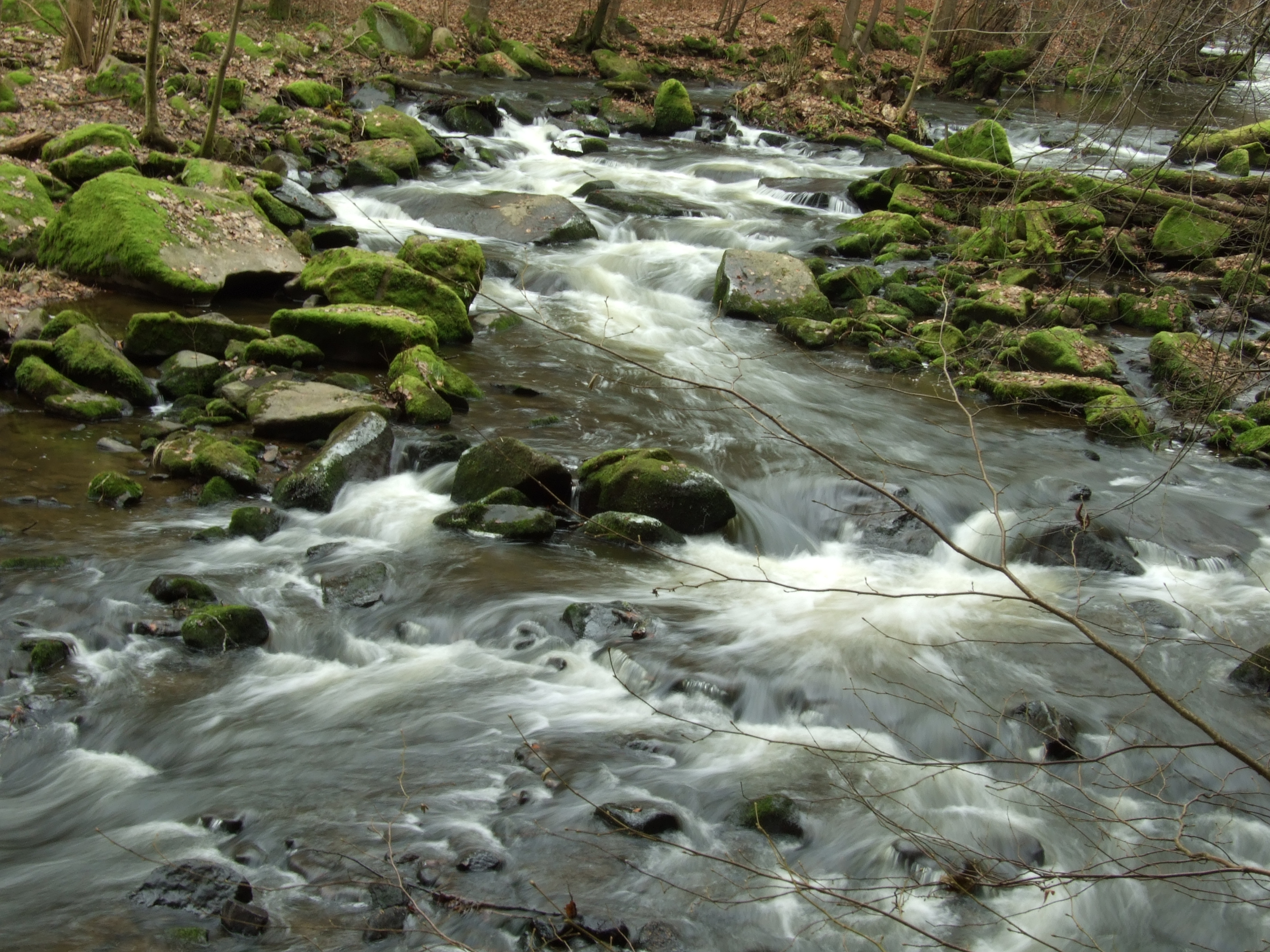
The Hamerský potok near Blažejov

The Hamerský potok originates in the territory of Horní Dubenky in the Javořice Highlands at an elevation of 757 m (2,484 ft) and flows to Jindřichův Hradec, where it enters the Nežárka River at an elevation of 455 m (1,493 ft). It is 46.3 km (28.8 mi) long. Its drainage basin has an area of 221.5 km^{2} (85.5 sq mi). The average discharge at 11.6 river km in Blažejov is 1.33 m^{3}/s (47 cu ft/s).

The longest tributaries of the Hamerský potok are:

Tributary	Length (km)	Side
Olešná	17.3	right
Studenský potok	15.6	left
Chlum	11.5	left
Lomský potok	7.3	left

== Course ==
The stream flows through the municipal territories of Horní Dubenky, Jihlávka, Kaliště, Panské Dubenky, Studená, Zahrádky, Jilem, Horní Meziříčko, Strmilov, Střížovice, Blažejov, Rodvínov and Jindřichův Hradec.

== Bodies of water ==
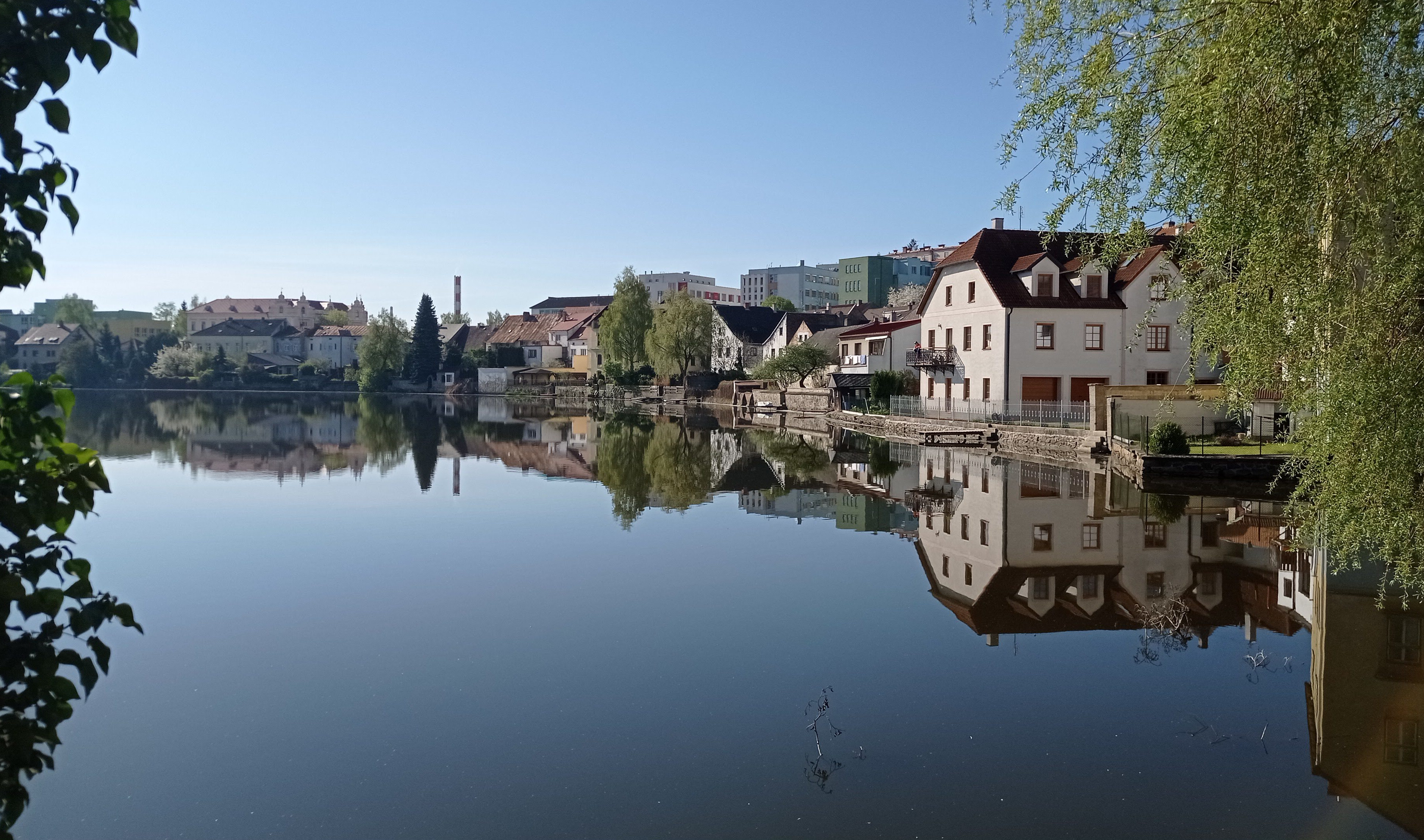
Vajgar pond

The basin area is rich in fishponds. The largest of them is Krvavý rybník with an area of 118 ha (290 acres). Many of the fishponds are built directly on the Hamerský potok; the largest of them are Ratmírovský rybník with an area of 73 ha (180 acres) and Hejtman with an area of 65 ha (160 acres). A significant pond is also Vajgar, located in the centre of Jindřichův Hradec near the stream's mouth. With an area of 49 ha (120 acres), it is one of the symbols of the town.

== Tourism ==
The lower course of the Hamerský potok is suitable for river tourism in autumn, when water is released from the fishpond Ratmírovský rybník. A paddling competition is held here every year.

== See also ==
- List of rivers of the Czech Republic
