= Nežárka =

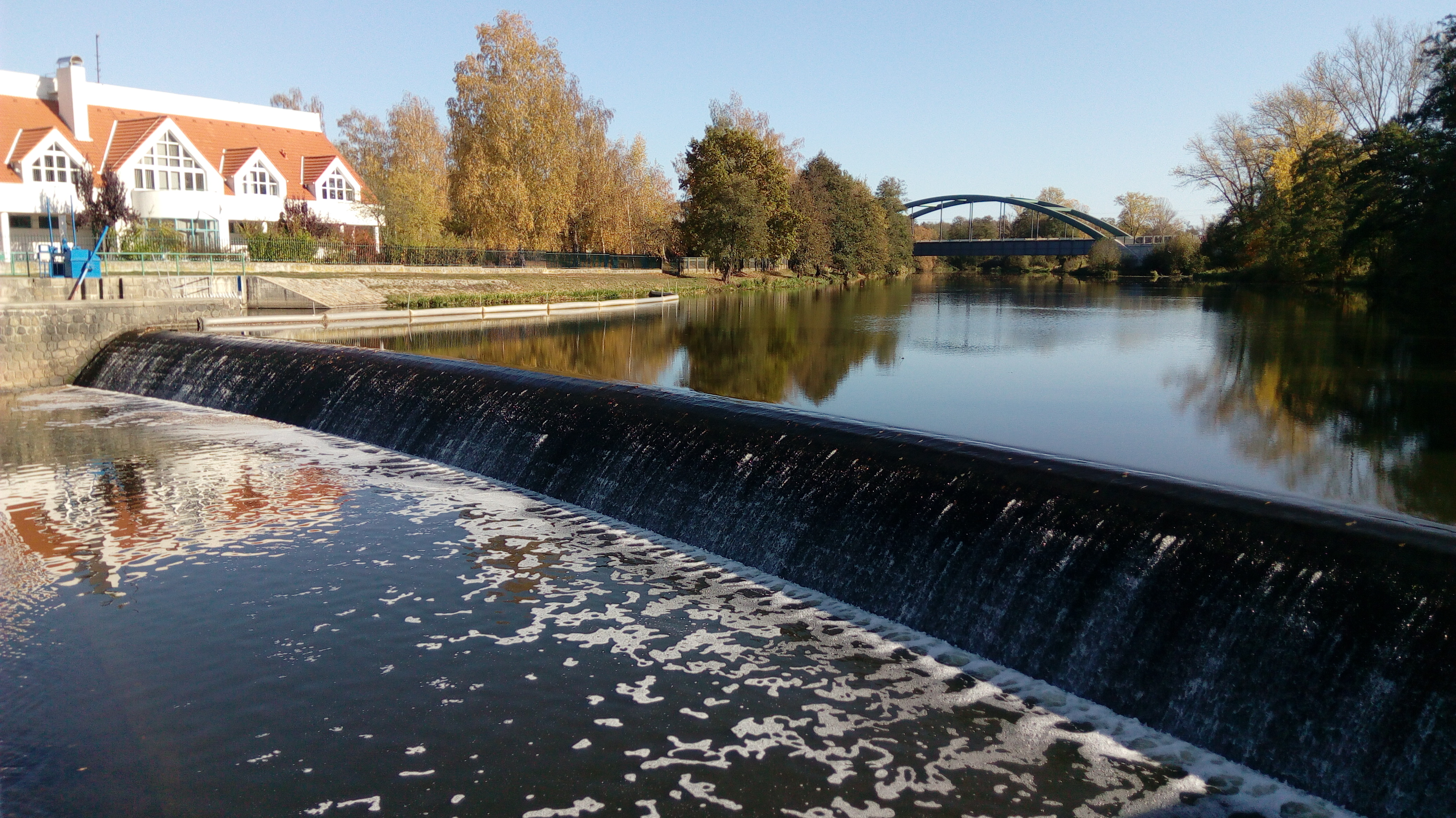
- The Nežárka in Veselí nad Lužnicí

Location
- Country: Czech Republic
- Region: South Bohemian

Physical characteristics
- Source: Kamenice
  - location: Těmice, Křemešník Highlands
  - coordinates: 49°21′20″N 15°2′14″E
  - elevation: 669 m (2,195 ft)
- Mouth
  - location: Lužnice
  - coordinates: 49°11′22″N 14°42′11″E
  - elevation: 407 m (1,335 ft)
- Length: 85.6 km (53.2 mi)
- Basin size: 1,000.8 km^{2} (386.4 sq mi)
- Discharge
  - average: 12.3 m^{3}/s (430 cu ft/s) near estuary

Basin features
- Progression: Lužnice→ Vltava→ Elbe→ North Sea

The Nežárka (Czech pronunciation: [ˈnɛʒaːrka]; German: Naser) is a river in the Czech Republic, a right tributary of the Lužnice River. It flows through the South Bohemian Region. It is formed by the confluence of the Kamenice and Žirovnice rivers in Jarošov nad Nežárkou. Together with the Kamenice, which is its main source, the Nežárka is 85.6 km (53.2 mi) long. Without the Kamenice, it is 56.0 km (34.8 mi) long.

== Etymology ==
The river was originally named Včelnice. Around 1500, it began to be called Nežárka after the suburb of the same name in Jindřichův Hradec. It was officially renamed in 1654.

== Characteristic ==
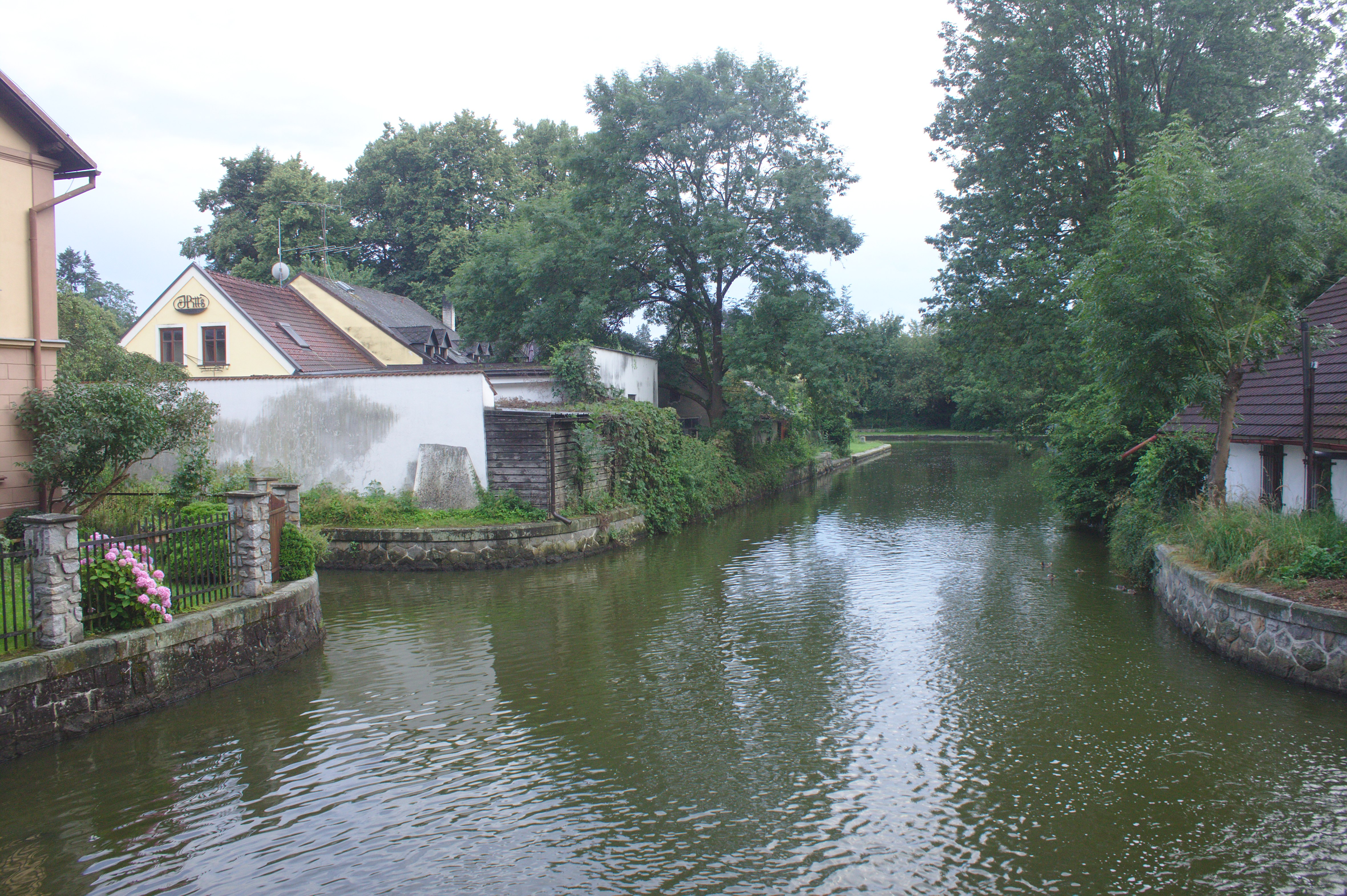
Confluence of the Nežárka and Hamerský potok

From a water management point of view, the Nežárka, Kamenice and Žirovnice are three different rivers with separate numbering of river kilometres. The Nežárka itself is formed by the confluence of the Kamenice and Žirovnice in Jarošov nad Nežárkou, and is 56.0 km (34.8 mi) long. In a broader point of view, the Nežárka (as Kamenice) originates in the territory of Těmice in the Křemešník Highlands, on the slope of the Bohutín hill at an elevation of 669 m (2,195 ft) and flows to Veselí nad Lužnicí, where it enters the Lužnice River at an elevation of 407 m (1,335 ft). It is 85.6 km (53.2 mi) long. Its drainage basin has an area of 1,000.8 km^{2} (386.4 sq mi).

The sources and longest tributaries of the Nežárka are:

Tributary	Length (km)	River km	Side
Hamerský potok	46.3	44.4	left
Kamenice	29.5	56.0	–
Žirovnice	29.3	56.0	left
Řečice	21.5	11.8	right
Radouňský potok	18.6	47.8	right
Řečička	11.2	41.1	left
Pěnenský potok	10.0	40.7	left
Lásenice	9.2	34.1	left
Ratmírovský potok	9.1	46.4	right

A left tributary of the Nežárka is also the artificial channel Nová řeka with a length of 13.5 km. It carries water from the Lužnice River.

== Course ==
The most notable settlement on the river is the town of Jindřichův Hradec, other settlements on the river are Jarošov nad Nežárkou, Rodvínov and Stráž nad Nežárkou. The river flows through the municipal territories of Jarošov nad Nežárkou, Rodvínov, Horní Skrýchov, Jindřichův Hradec, Dolní Žďár, Lásenice, Stráž nad Nežárkou, Plavsko, Hatín, Novosedly nad Nežárkou, Kardašova Řečice, Val, Drahov, Vlkov and Veselí nad Lužnicí.

== Bodies of water ==
The lower course of the Nežárka flows through the Třeboň Basin, which is known for its fishponds. There are 528 bodies of water larger than 1 ha in the basin area and many smaller. The largest body of water in the basin area is the Holná (or Velká Holná) Pond with an area of 230 ha (570 acres). There are no ponds or reservoirs built directly on the Nežárka.

== Tourism ==
The Nežárka is suitable for river tourism. It is suitable for beginner paddlers.

== See also ==
- List of rivers of the Czech Republic
