= Jilem =

Jilem may refer to places in the Czech Republic:

- Jilem (Havlíčkův Brod District), a municipality and village in the Vysočina Region
- Jilem (Jindřichův Hradec District), a municipality and village in the South Bohemian Region
