= Hamerský potok =

Hamerský potok may refer to:

- Hamerský potok (Mže), a stream in the Czech Republic and Germany
- Hamerský potok (Nežárka), a stream in the Czech Republic
