= Lásenice =

- Municipality
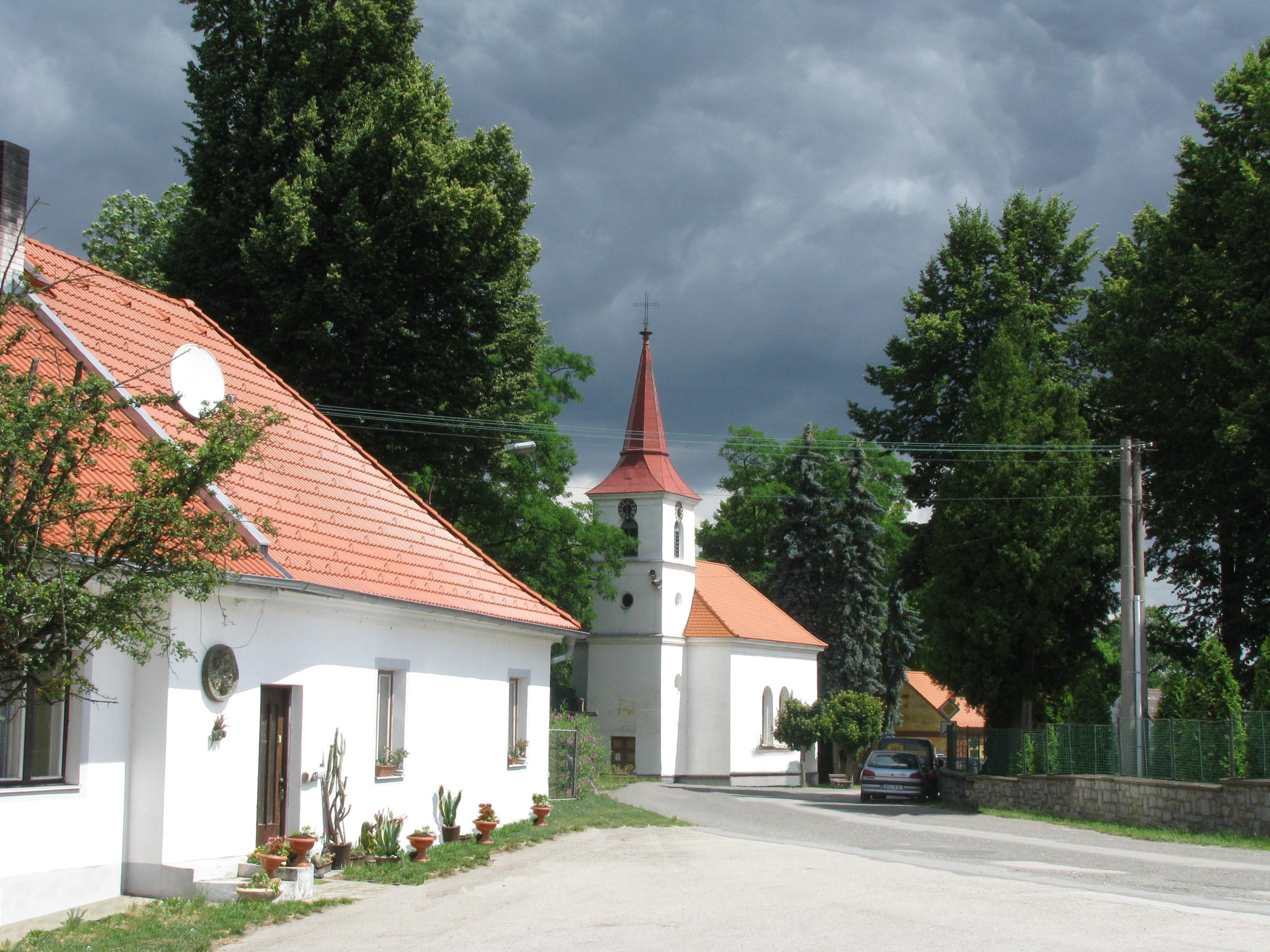
- Chapel of Saint John of Nepomuk

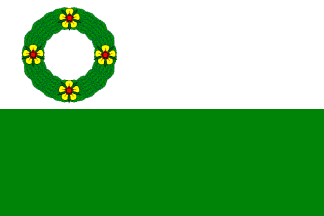
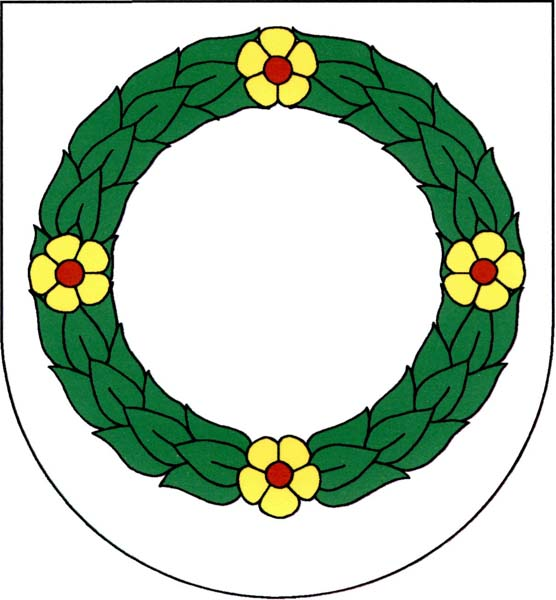
- Flag Coat of arms

- Location in the Czech Republic
- Coordinates: 49°4′28″N 14°58′13″E
- Country: Czech Republic
- Region: South Bohemian
- District: Jindřichův Hradec
- First mentioned: 1366

Area
  - Total: 10.41 km^{2} (4.02 sq mi)
- Elevation: 450 m (1,480 ft)

Population (2026-01-01)
  - Total: 556
  - Density: 53.4/km^{2} (138/sq mi)
- Time zone: UTC+1 (CET)
  - Summer (DST): UTC+2 (CEST)
- Postal code: 378 01
- Website: www.lasenice.cz

Lásenice is a municipality and village in Jindřichův Hradec District in the South Bohemian Region of the Czech Republic. It has about 600 inhabitants. It lies on the Nežárka River.

Lásenice lies approximately 9 kilometres (6 mi) south of Jindřichův Hradec, 38 km (24 mi) east of České Budějovice, and 120 km (75 mi) south of Prague.

== Demographics ==
Historical population
Year	Pop.	±%
1869	653	—
1880	645	−1.2%
1890	657	+1.9%
1900	676	+2.9%
1910	694	+2.7%
1921	616	−11.2%
1930	604	−1.9%
1950	492	−18.5%
1961	513	+4.3%
1970	468	−8.8%
1980	475	+1.5%
1991	472	−0.6%
2001	500	+5.9%
2011	550	+10.0%
2021	540	−1.8%
Source: Censuses

== Notable people ==
- Karel Hájek (1900–1978), photographer
