= Novosedly nad Nežárkou =

- Municipality
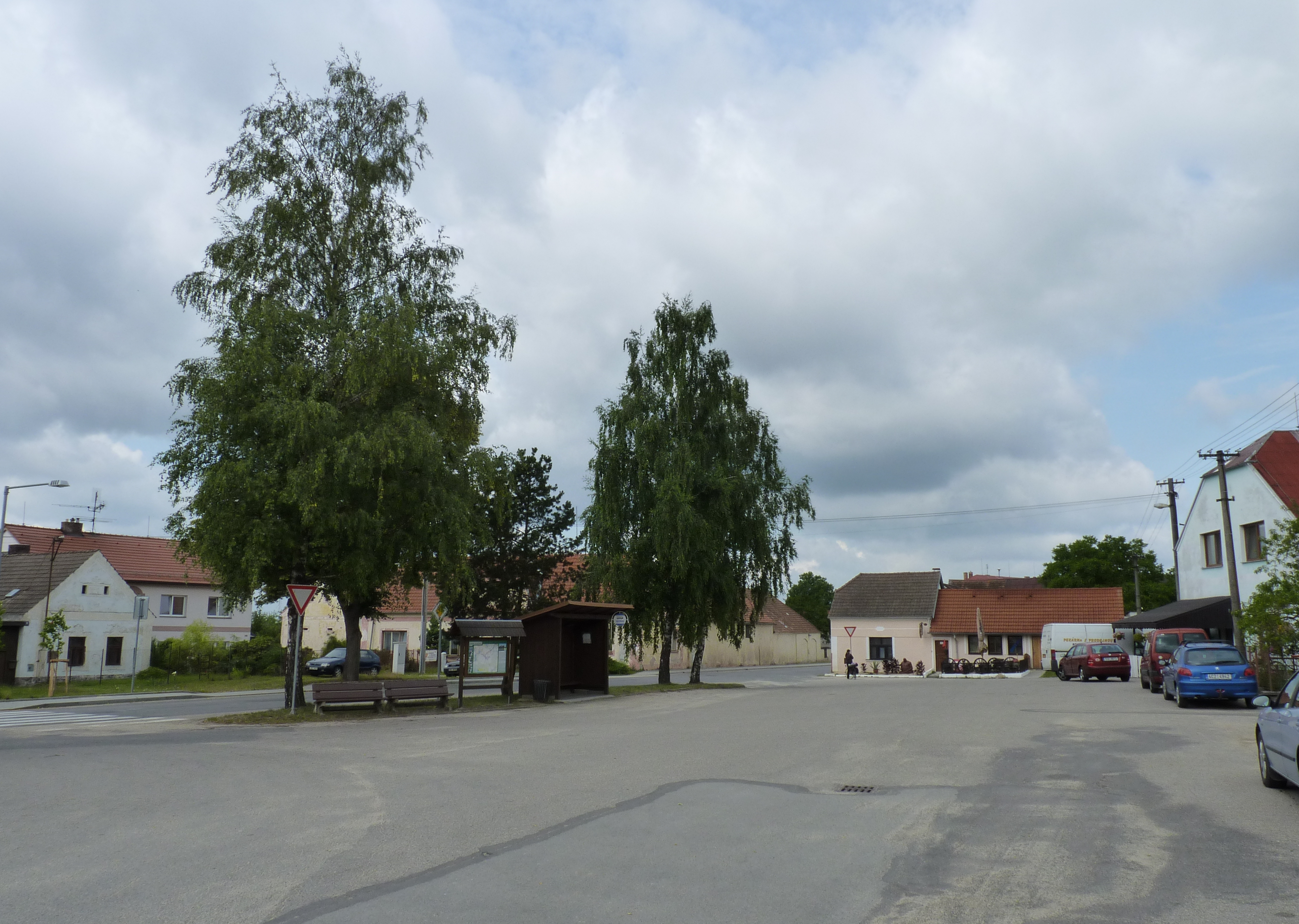
- Common in Novosedly nad Nežárkou

- Flag Coat of arms

- Location in the Czech Republic
- Coordinates: 49°4′52″N 14°49′20″E
- Country: Czech Republic
- Region: South Bohemian
- District: Jindřichův Hradec
- First mentioned: 1359

Area
  - Total: 44.72 km^{2} (17.27 sq mi)
- Elevation: 460 m (1,510 ft)

Population (2026-01-01)
  - Total: 694
  - Density: 15.5/km^{2} (40.2/sq mi)
- Time zone: UTC+1 (CET)
  - Summer (DST): UTC+2 (CEST)
- Postal code: 378 17
- Website: www.novosedly.cz

Novosedly nad Nežárkou is a municipality and village in Jindřichův Hradec District in the South Bohemian Region of the Czech Republic. It has about 700 inhabitants.

Novosedly nad Nežárkou lies on the Nežárka River, approximately 15 kilometres (9 mi) south-west of Jindřichův Hradec, 29 km (18 mi) north-east of České Budějovice, and 116 km (72 mi) south of Prague.

== Administrative division ==
Novosedly nad Nežárkou consists of three municipal parts (in brackets population according to the 2021 census):

- Novosedly nad Nežárkou (434)
- Kolence (132)
- Mláka (121)

== Etymology ==
The village of Novosedly was named after the people who were nově usedlí ('newly settled').

== Demographics ==
Historical population
Year	Pop.	±%
1869	1,626	—
1880	1,532	−5.8%
1890	1,622	+5.9%
1900	1,653	+1.9%
1910	1,661	+0.5%
1921	1,540	−7.3%
1930	1,453	−5.6%
1950	1,045	−28.1%
1961	1,032	−1.2%
1970	851	−17.5%
1980	731	−14.1%
1991	659	−9.8%
2001	657	−0.3%
2011	624	−5.0%
2021	687	+10.1%
Source: Censuses

== Twin towns – sister cities ==
Novosedly nad Nežárkou is twinned with:

- Trub, Switzerland
