= Stráž nad Nežárkou =

- Town
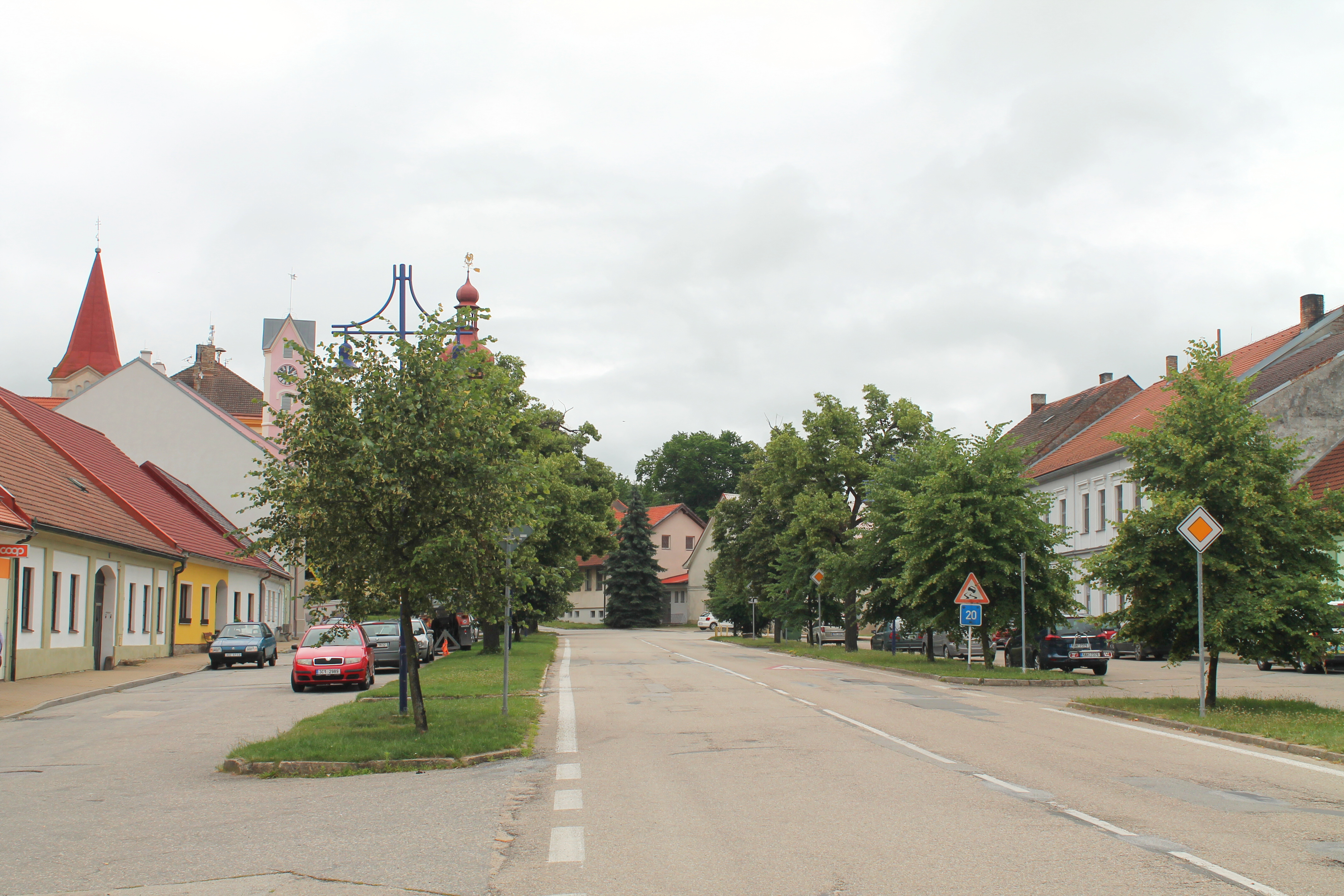
- Emy Destinnové Square

- Flag Coat of arms

- Location in the Czech Republic
- Coordinates: 49°4′6″N 14°54′0″E
- Country: Czech Republic
- Region: South Bohemian
- District: Jindřichův Hradec
- First mentioned: 1284

Government
  - Mayor: Jiří Krupička

Area
  - Total: 36.29 km^{2} (14.01 sq mi)
- Elevation: 450 m (1,480 ft)

Population (2026-01-01)
  - Total: 877
  - Density: 24.2/km^{2} (62.6/sq mi)
- Time zone: UTC+1 (CET)
  - Summer (DST): UTC+2 (CEST)
- Postal code: 378 02
- Website: www.straznadnezarkou.cz

Stráž nad Nežárkou (Czech pronunciation: [ˈstraːʒ ˈnad nɛʒaːrkou]; German: Platz an der Naser) is a town in Jindřichův Hradec District in the South Bohemian Region of the Czech Republic. It has about 900 inhabitants. It lies on the Nežárka River.

== Administrative division ==
Stráž nad Nežárkou consists of three municipal parts (in brackets population according to the 2021 census):

- Stráž nad Nežárkou (702)
- Dolní Lhota (120)
- Dvorce (22)

== Etymology ==
The name Stráž means 'guard' in Czech. This name was often given to places that were used for guarding and from which it was possible to see well into the distance, or to places along rivers that served to keep watch so that no one passed without paying the toll. The suffix nad Nežárkou means 'upon the Nežárka'.

== Geography ==
Stráž nad Nežárkou is located about 10 kilometres (6 mi) southwest of Jindřichův Hradec and 32 km (20 mi) east of České Budějovice. It lies mostly in the Třeboň Basin, but the elongated municipal territory also extends into the Javořice Highlands in the southeast and, to a lesser extent, into the Křemešník Highlands in the north. The highest point is the hill Homolka at 615 m (2,018 ft) above sea level.

The Nežárka River flows through the town. The territory of Stráž nad Nežárkou briefly borders Austria in the southeast and this border is formed by the stream Koštěnický potok. The western part of the municipal territory lies within the Třeboňsko Protected Landscape Area and is rich in fishponds.

== History ==
The first written mention of Stráž is from 1284, when it was owned by Sezema of Stráž. It is unknown when it was promoted to a market town. Among the notable owners of Stráž were the Lobkowicz family. They sold the estate to William of Rosenberg in 1577. His brother Peter Vok of Rosenberg then sold most of the estate to the Lords of Hradec and Stráž became part of the Jindřichův Hradec estate. In 1715–1735, the Slavatas of Chlum and Košumberk ruled Stráž, which was temporarily a separate estate during this period. In 1876, Stráž was promoted to a town.

== Demographics ==
Historical population

Year	Pop.	±%
1869	2,005	—
1880	1,934	−3.5%
1890	2,052	+6.1%
1900	1,947	−5.1%
1910	1,731	−11.1%

Year	Pop.	±%
1921	1,529	−11.7%
1930	1,379	−9.8%
1950	1,199	−13.1%
1961	1,193	−0.5%
1970	1,054	−11.7%

Year	Pop.	±%
1980	993	−5.8%
1991	887	−10.7%
2001	777	−12.4%
2011	841	+8.2%
2021	844	+0.4%

Source: Censuses

== Transport ==
The I/34 road (part of European route E551) runs through the town.

== Sights ==
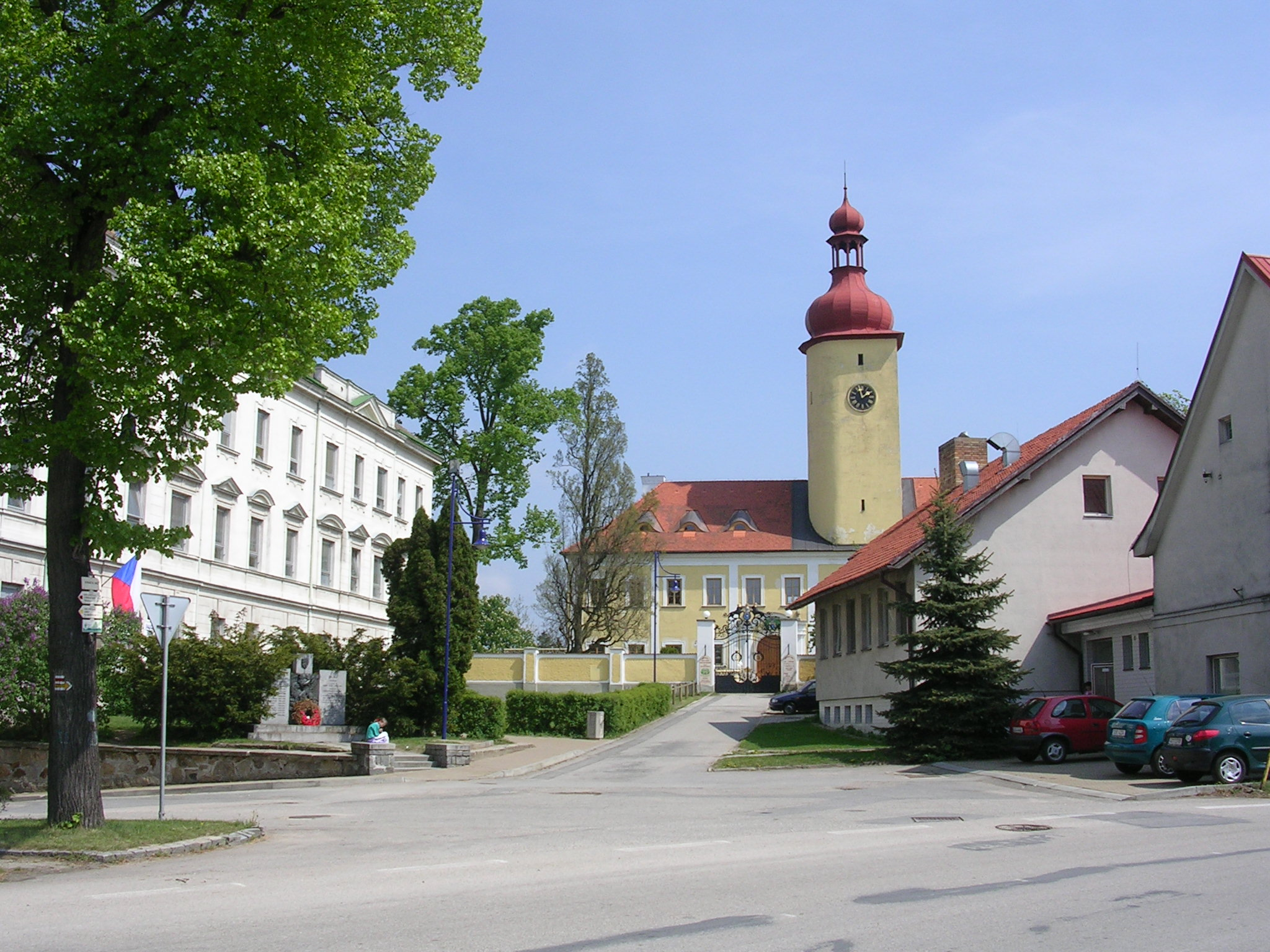
View towards the castle

The Church of Saints Peter and Paul was built in the Gothic style in 1413. Because of its poor condition, the nave was demolished and rebuilt in 1913.

The separate bell tower was probably built at the turn of the 16th and 17th centuries. In 1861, it was rebuilt in the Neo-Romanesque style and raised.

The Stráž nad Nežárkou Castle was originally a medieval Gothic building. In 1715, after most of the castle was destroyed by a fire, it was rebuilt into its present Baroque form and only a tower from the third quarter of the 13th century survived. From 1914 until her death in 1930, the castle was owned by Emmy Destinn. Today the castle is open to the public and houses a museum of Emmy Destinn.

== Notable people ==
- Friedrich von Berchtold (1781–1876), Austrian botanist
- Emmy Destinn (1878–1930), operatic soprano; lived here in 1914–1930
