= Karel Hájek =

Czechoslovak photographer

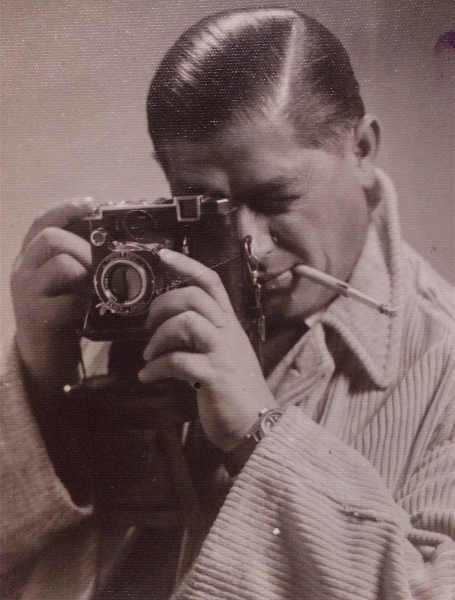
Karel Hájek in 1935

Karel Hájek (22 January 1900, in Lásenice – 31 March 1978, in Prague) was a Czechoslovak photographer who was represented by Schostal Photo Agency (Agentur Schostal).

Among his best known photographs is the one of Klement Gottwald and Vladimir Clementis on a balcony in 1948 from which Clementis was later erased.

== Gallery ==
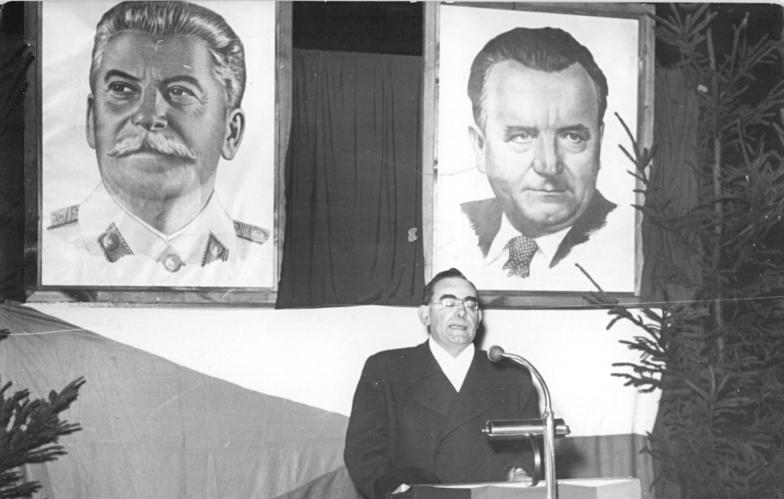
German writer Louis Fürnberg giving a speech in front of the portraits of Klement Gottwald and Joseph Stalin

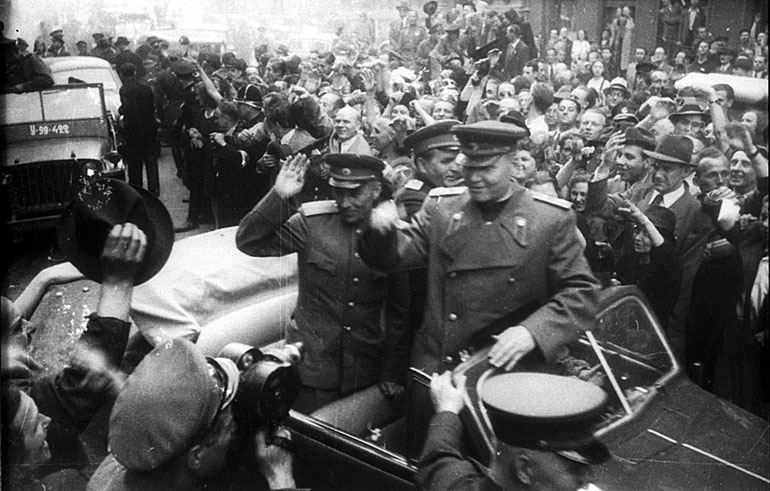
Soviet Marshal Ivan Koniev in the Liberation of Prague, 1945
