= Horní Dubenky =

- Municipality
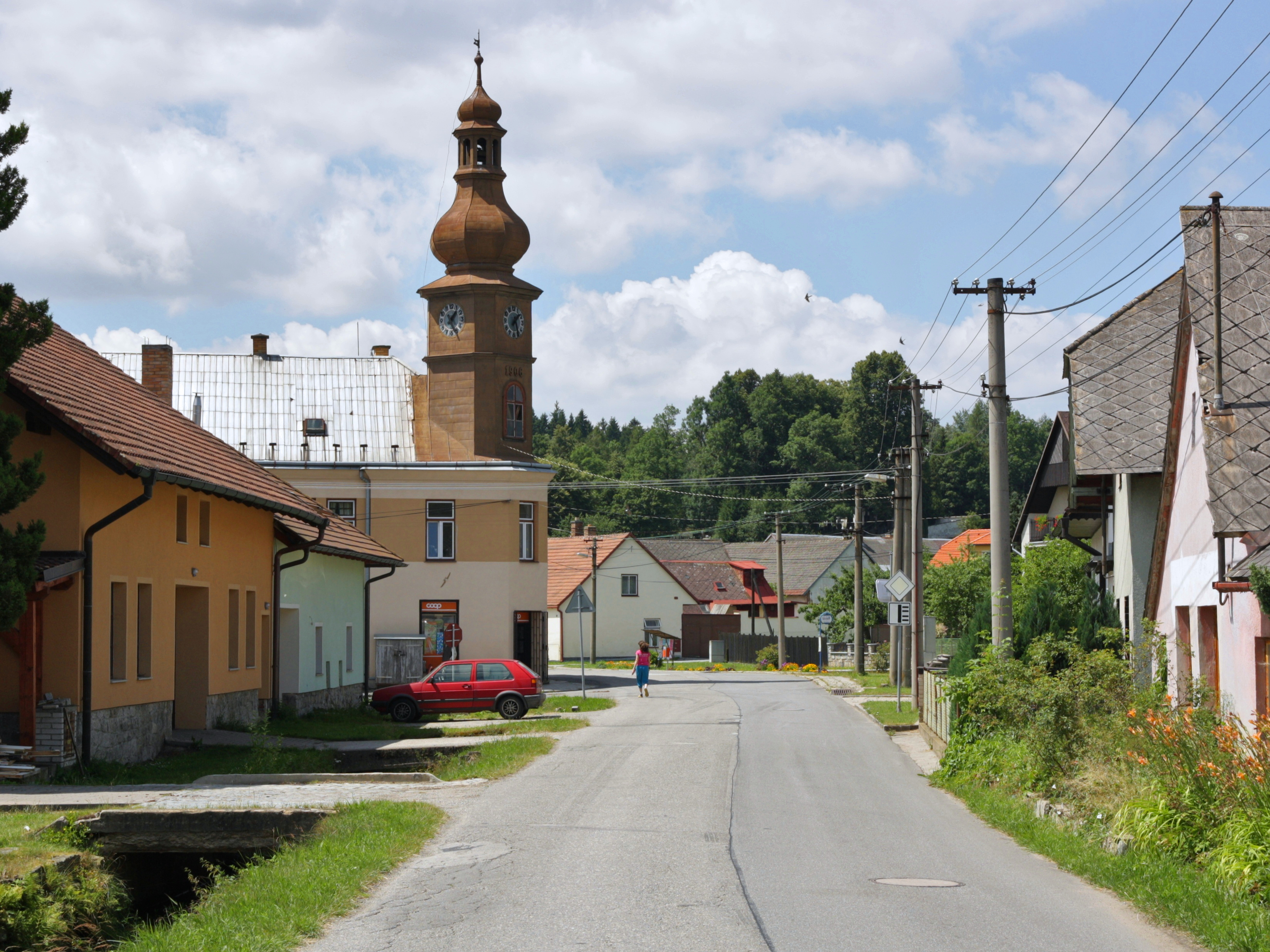
- Main street with the municipal office

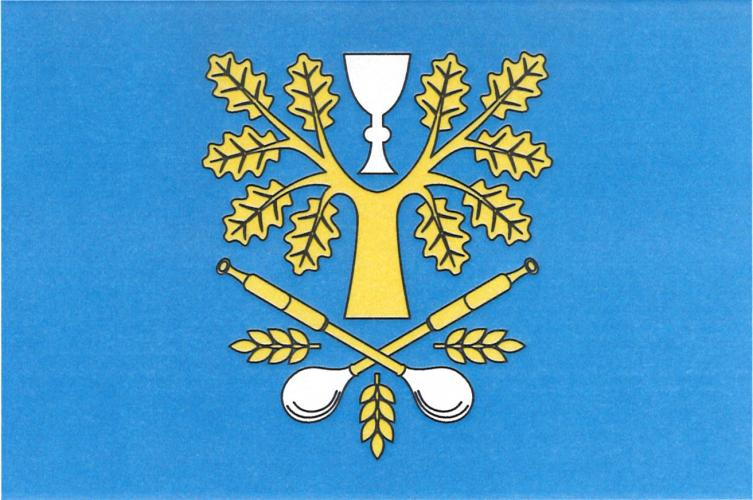
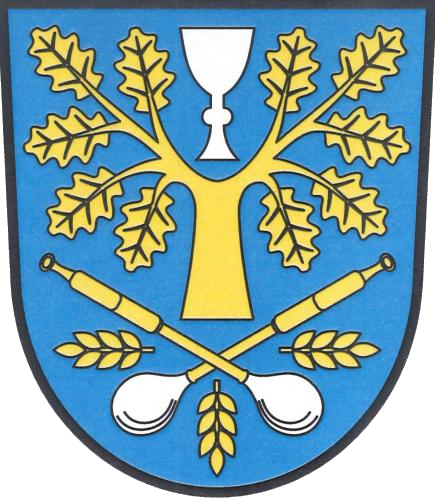
- Flag Coat of arms

- Location in the Czech Republic
- Coordinates: 49°15′35″N 15°19′1″E
- Country: Czech Republic
- Region: Vysočina
- District: Jihlava
- First mentioned: 1385

Area
  - Total: 9.97 km^{2} (3.85 sq mi)
- Elevation: 669 m (2,195 ft)

Population (2026-01-01)
  - Total: 544
  - Density: 54.6/km^{2} (141/sq mi)
- Time zone: UTC+1 (CET)
  - Summer (DST): UTC+2 (CEST)
- Postal code: 588 52
- Website: www.hornidubenky.cz

Horní Dubenky (Czech pronunciation: [ˈɦorɲiː ˈdubɛŋkɪ]) is a municipality and village in Jihlava District in the Vysočina Region of the Czech Republic. It has about 500 inhabitants.

Horní Dubenky lies approximately 25 kilometres (16 mi) south-west of Jihlava and 113 km (70 mi) south-east of Prague. The stream Hamerský potok originates in the municipality.

== Demographics ==
Historical population
Year	Pop.	±%
1869	614	—
1880	594	−3.3%
1890	673	+13.3%
1900	821	+22.0%
1910	981	+19.5%
1921	810	−17.4%
1930	830	+2.5%
1950	689	−17.0%
1961	633	−8.1%
1970	679	+7.3%
1980	704	+3.7%
1991	661	−6.1%
2001	648	−2.0%
2011	649	+0.2%
2021	550	−15.3%
Source: Censuses
