= Jarošov nad Nežárkou =

- Municipality
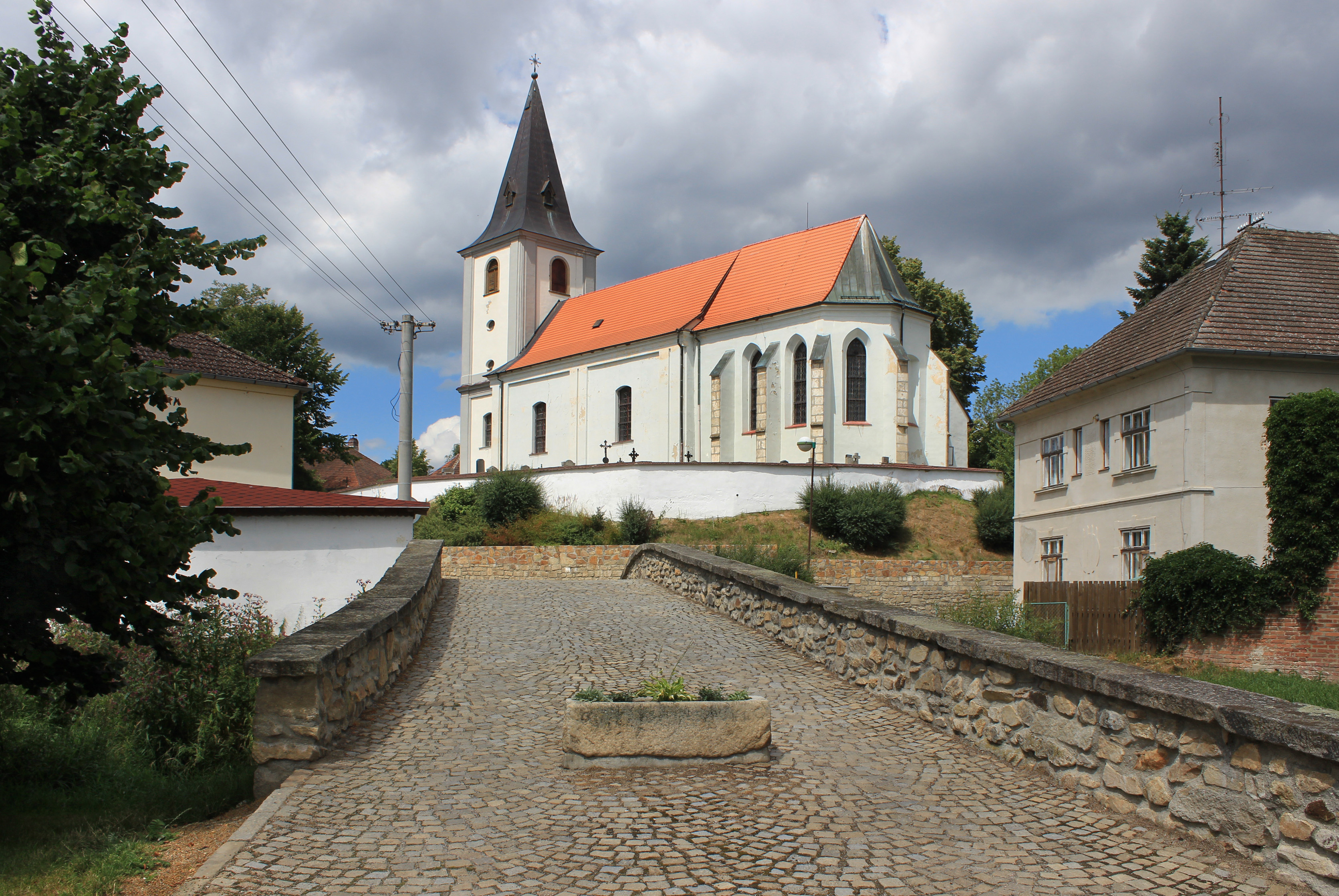
- Stone bridge and Church of Saint Procopius

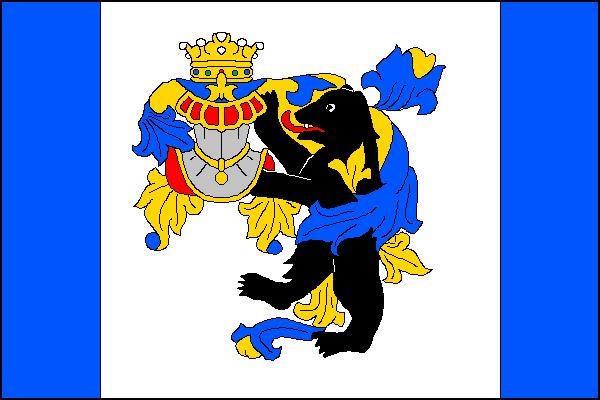
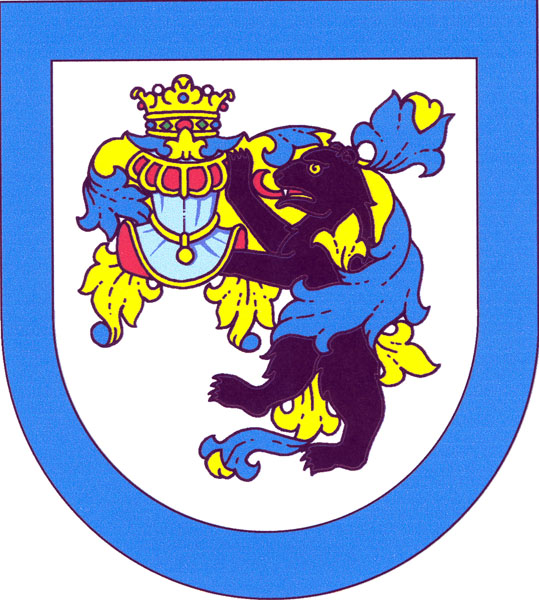
- Flag Coat of arms

- Location in the Czech Republic
- Coordinates: 49°11′24″N 15°4′2″E
- Country: Czech Republic
- Region: South Bohemian
- District: Jindřichův Hradec
- First mentioned: 1340

Area
  - Total: 27.76 km^{2} (10.72 sq mi)
- Elevation: 476 m (1,562 ft)

Population (2026-01-01)
  - Total: 1,078
  - Density: 38.83/km^{2} (100.6/sq mi)
- Time zone: UTC+1 (CET)
  - Summer (DST): UTC+2 (CEST)
- Postal code: 378 41, 378 42
- Website: www.jarosov.cz

Jarošov nad Nežárkou (German: Jareschau) is a municipality and village in Jindřichův Hradec District in the South Bohemian Region of the Czech Republic. It has about 1,100 inhabitants. It lies on the Nežárka River.

Jarošov nad Nežárkou lies approximately 7 kilometres (4 mi) north-east of Jindřichův Hradec, 50 km (31 mi) north-east of České Budějovice, and 111 km (69 mi) south-east of Prague.

== Administrative division ==
Jarošov nad Nežárkou consists of eight municipal parts (in brackets population according to the 2021 census):

- Jarošov nad Nežárkou (671)
- Hostějeves (57)
- Kruplov (30)
- Lovětín (88)
- Matějovec (25)
- Nekrasín (40)
- Pejdlova Rosička (4)
- Zdešov (154)

== Demographics ==
Historical population
Year	Pop.	±%
1869	1,335	—
1880	1,359	+1.8%
1890	1,323	−2.6%
1900	1,356	+2.5%
1910	1,412	+4.1%
1921	1,438	+1.8%
1930	1,397	−2.9%
1950	1,092	−21.8%
1961	1,061	−2.8%
1970	995	−6.2%
1980	1,014	+1.9%
1991	1,002	−1.2%
2001	1,048	+4.6%
2011	1,087	+3.7%
2021	1,069	−1.7%
Source: Censuses
