= Studená (Jindřichův Hradec District) =

- Municipality
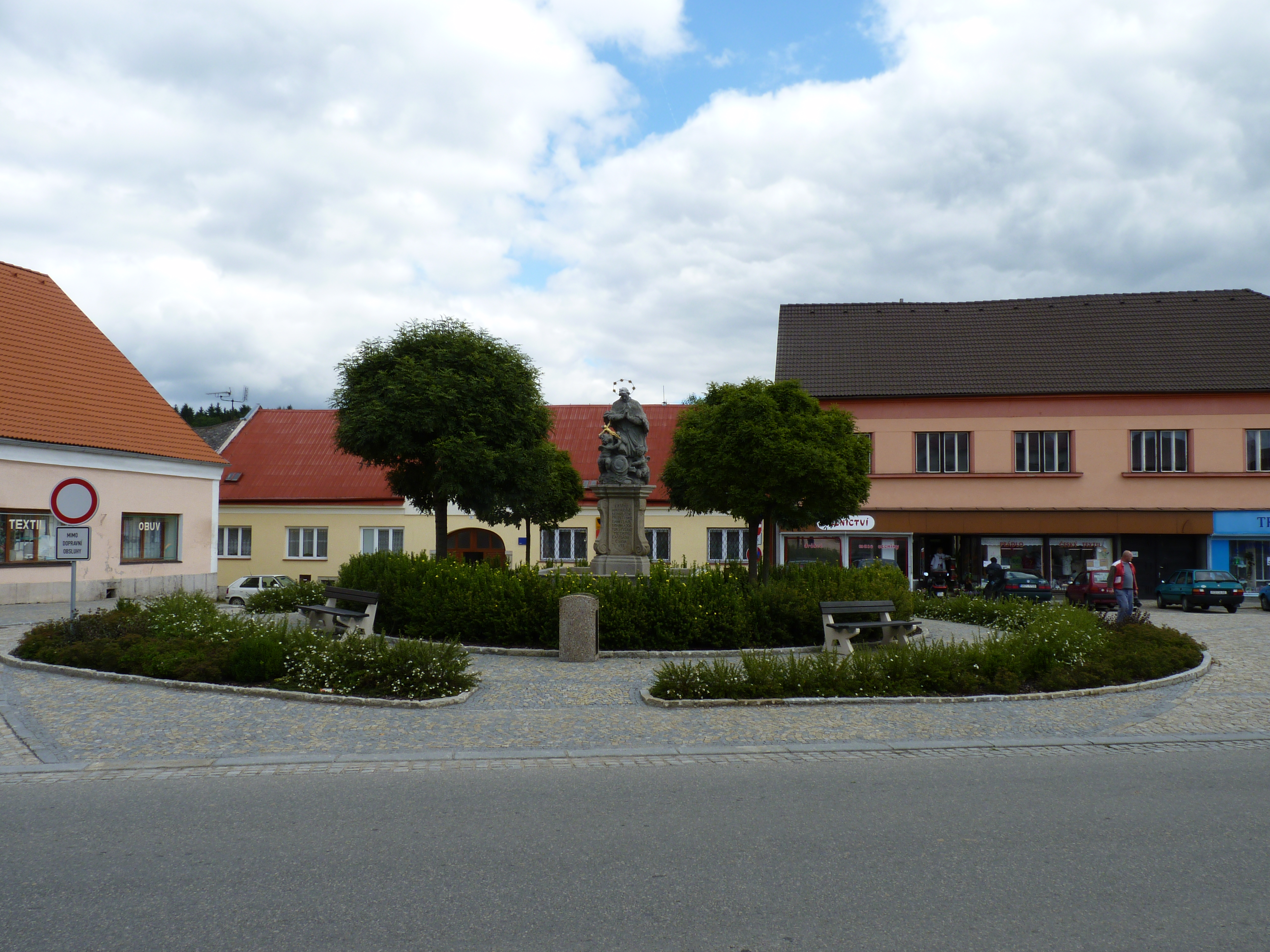
- Square with the statue of St. John of Nepomuk

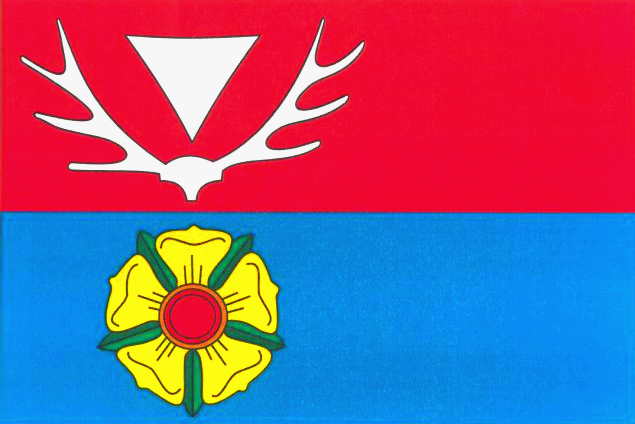
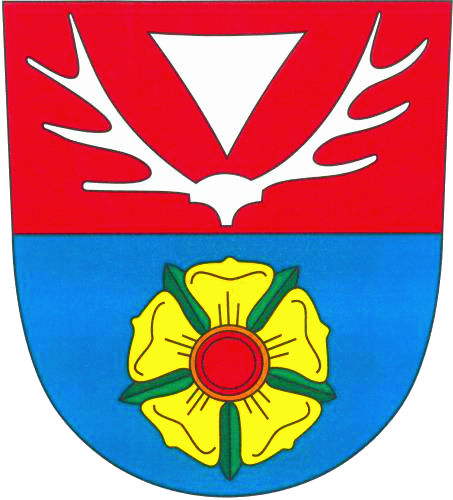
- Flag Coat of arms

- Location in the Czech Republic
- Coordinates: 49°11′17″N 15°17′13″E
- Country: Czech Republic
- Region: South Bohemian
- District: Jindřichův Hradec
- First mentioned: 1365

Area
  - Total: 44.96 km^{2} (17.36 sq mi)
- Elevation: 618 m (2,028 ft)

Population (2026-01-01)
  - Total: 2,177
  - Density: 48.42/km^{2} (125.4/sq mi)
- Time zone: UTC+1 (CET)
  - Summer (DST): UTC+2 (CEST)
- Postal codes: 378 53, 378 56
- Website: www.studena.cz

Studená is a municipality and village in Jindřichův Hradec District in the South Bohemian Region of the Czech Republic. It has about 2,200 inhabitants.

== Administrative division ==
Studená consists of ten municipal parts (in brackets population according to the 2021 census):

- Studená (1,579)
- Domašín (59)
- Horní Bolíkov (121)
- Horní Pole (81)
- Maršov (46)
- Olšany (95)
- Skrýchov (40)
- Sumrakov (85)
- Světlá (30)
- Velký Jeníkov (21)

Maršov, Olšany and Velký Jeníkov form an exclave of the municipal territory.

== Etymology ==
The name literally means 'cold' in Czech.

== Geography ==
Studená is located about 21 kilometres (13 mi) east of Jindřichův Hradec. It lies in the Javořice Highlands. The highest points is at 803 m (2,635 ft) above sea level. The stream Studenský potok flows through the municipality. The upper course of the stream Hamerský potok briefly flows along the northwestern municipal border near Domašín. The territory of Studená is rich in small fishponds.

== History ==
The first written mention of Studená is from 1365, when Lords of Hradec sold it to Dětřich of Obrataň. Between 1446 and 1458, during the rule of Barons of Studenec, Studená was promoted to a market town, but it lost the title sometime in the following centuries. From 1557, it belonged to the Telč estate.

== Demographics ==
Historical population

Year	Pop.	±%
1869	2,977	—
1880	3,123	+4.9%
1890	3,127	+0.1%
1900	3,178	+1.6%
1910	3,389	+6.6%

Year	Pop.	±%
1921	3,231	−4.7%
1930	3,268	+1.1%
1950	2,770	−15.2%
1961	2,807	+1.3%
1970	2,645	−5.8%

Year	Pop.	±%
1980	2,707	+2.3%
1991	2,649	−2.1%
2001	2,495	−5.8%
2011	2,295	−8.0%
2021	2,157	−6.0%

Source: Censuses

== Transport ==
There are no railways or major roads passing through the municipality.

== Sights ==
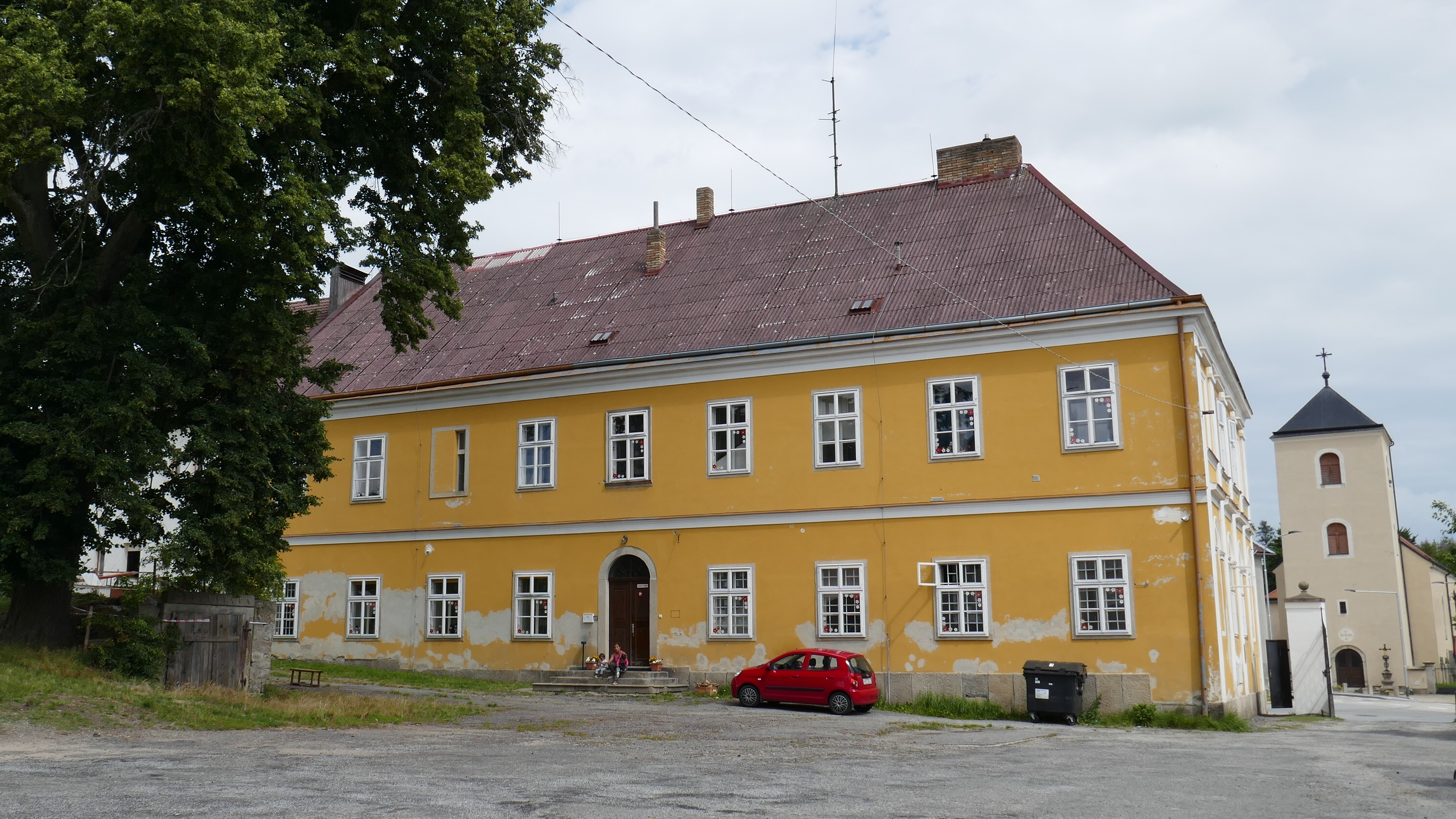
Studená Castle and Church of Saint Procopius

Among the main landmarks of Studená is the Studená Castle. It was built in the late Baroque style in the first half of the 18th century, but it has a Renaissance core. In the western part of the castle area there is a set of buildings of the former brewery, founded in 1517–1578. A Renaissance malt house has been preserved from this period.

The Church of Saint Procopius was originally a late Gothic building. It was rebuilt in the Baroque style after a fire in the mid-18th century.

The Church of Saint Wenceslaus is located in Olšany. It was built in 1787 and reconstructed in 1902. It is one of the few churches in the Czech lands built during the reign of Emperor Joseph II.

== Notable people ==
- Vlasta Javořická (1890–1979), writer

== Twin towns – sister cities ==
Studená is twinned with:

- Beemster, Netherlands
