= Vlkov (Tábor District) =

- Municipality
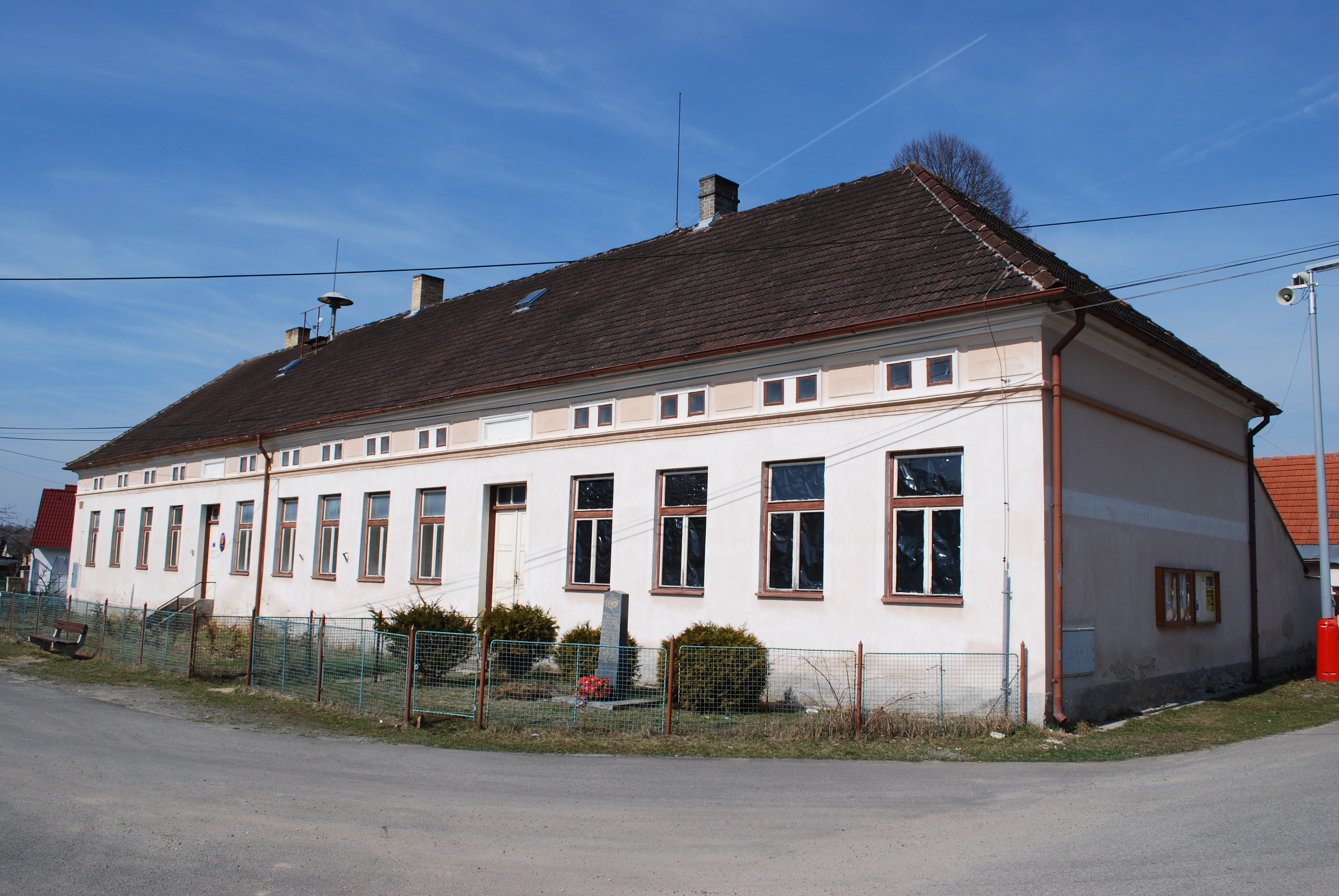
- Municipal office

- Location in the Czech Republic
- Coordinates: 49°9′5″N 14°43′31″E
- Country: Czech Republic
- Region: South Bohemian
- District: Tábor
- First mentioned: 1654

Area
  - Total: 6.55 km^{2} (2.53 sq mi)
- Elevation: 414 m (1,358 ft)

Population (2026-01-01)
  - Total: 187
  - Density: 28.5/km^{2} (73.9/sq mi)
- Time zone: UTC+1 (CET)
  - Summer (DST): UTC+2 (CEST)
- Postal code: 391 81
- Website: www.vlkovta.cz

Vlkov is a municipality and village in Tábor District in the South Bohemian Region of the Czech Republic. It has about 200 inhabitants.

Vlkov lies approximately 30 kilometres (19 mi) south of Tábor, 28 km (17 mi) north-east of České Budějovice, and 106 km (66 mi) south of Prague.

== Demographics ==
Historical population
| Year | Pop. | ±% |
|---|---|---|
| 1869 | 268 | — |
| 1880 | 261 | −2.6% |
| 1890 | 277 | +6.1% |
| 1900 | 283 | +2.2% |
| 1910 | 337 | +19.1% |
| 1921 | 342 | +1.5% |
| 1930 | 350 | +2.3% |
| 1950 | 311 | −11.1% |
| 1961 | 346 | +11.3% |
| 1970 | 321 | −7.2% |
| 1980 | 241 | −24.9% |
| 1991 | 165 | −31.5% |
| 2001 | 152 | −7.9% |
| 2011 | 149 | −2.0% |
| 2021 | 176 | +18.1% |
Source: Censuses
