= Jilem (Havlíčkův Brod District) =

- Municipality
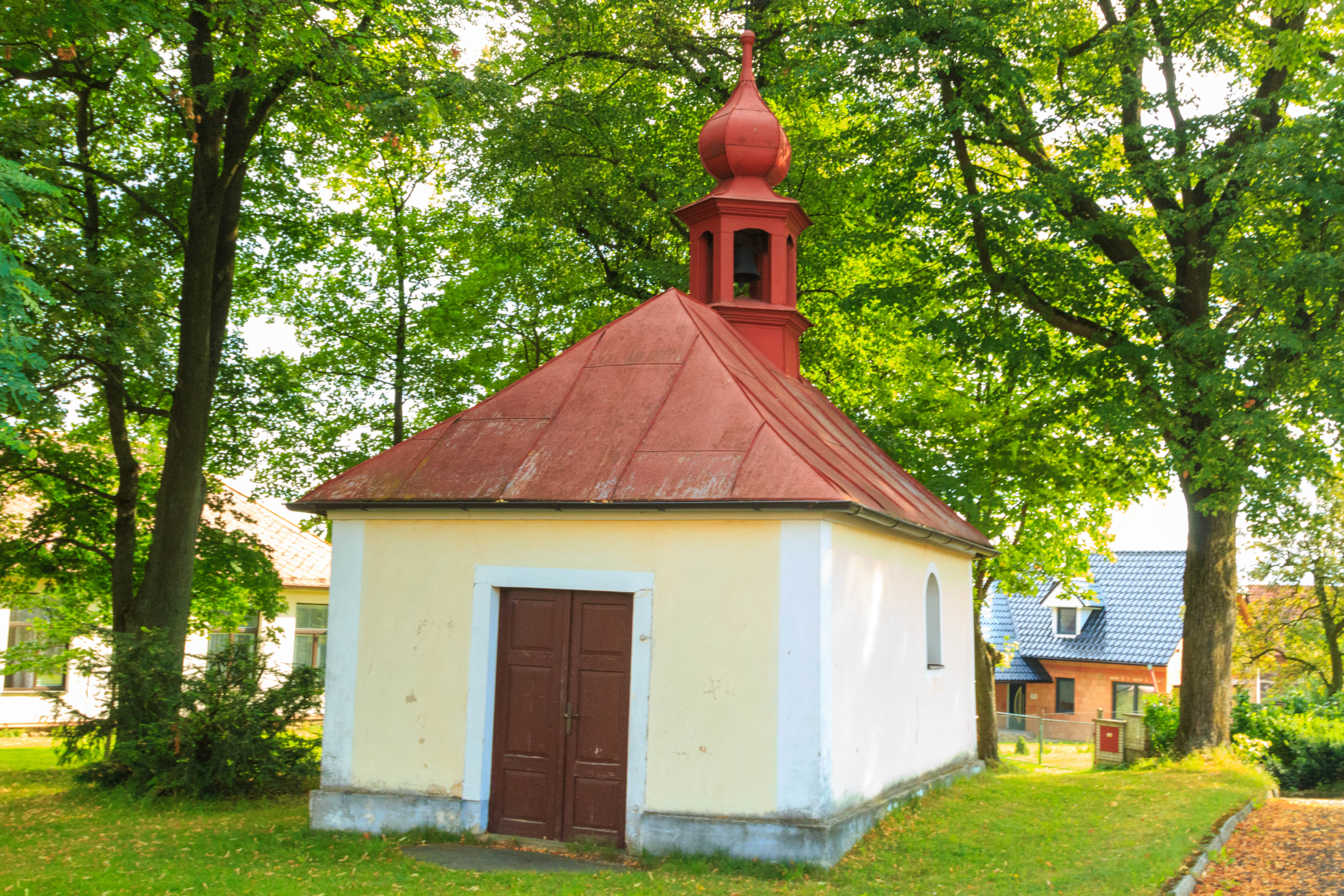
- Chapel of the Assumption of the Virgin Mary

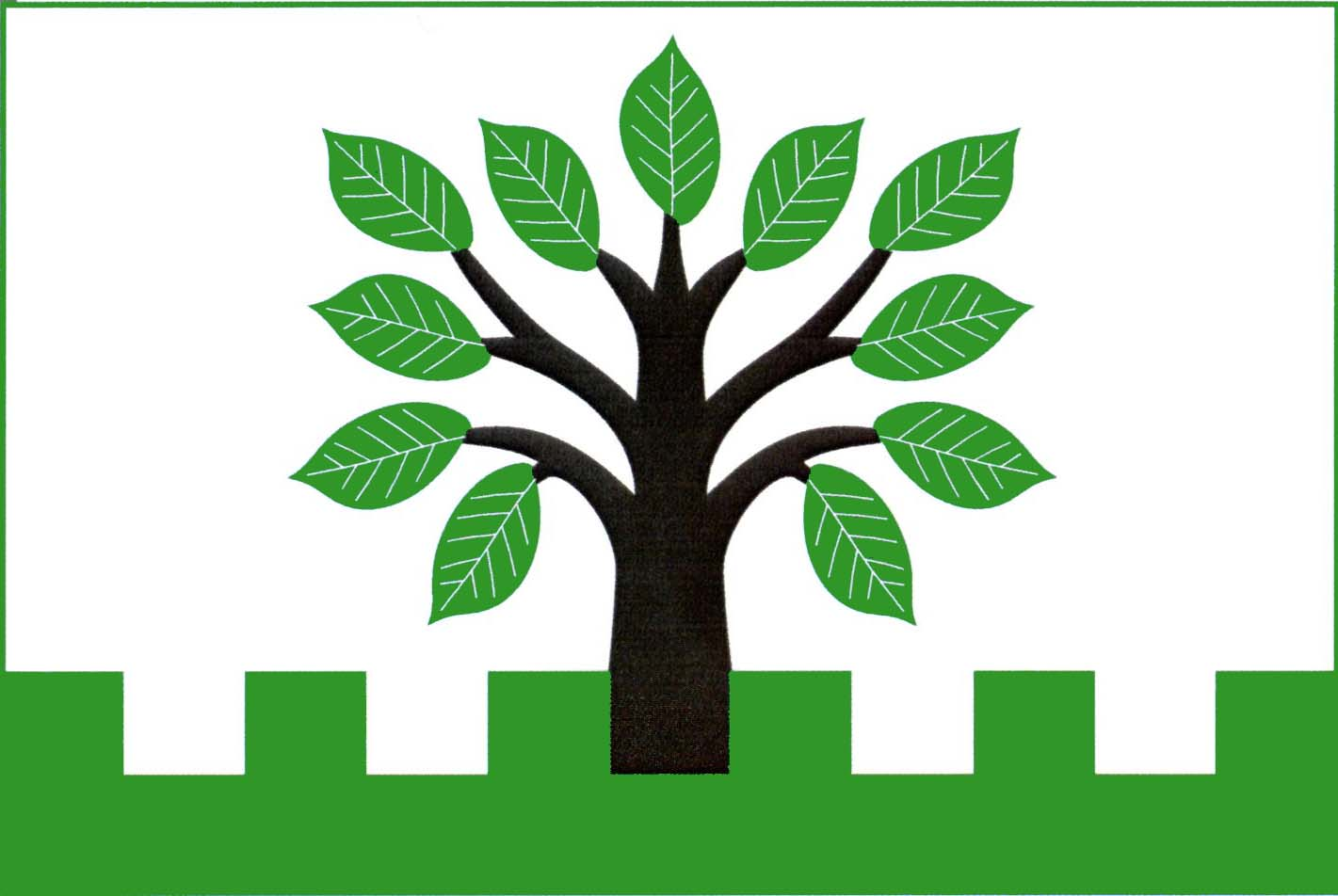
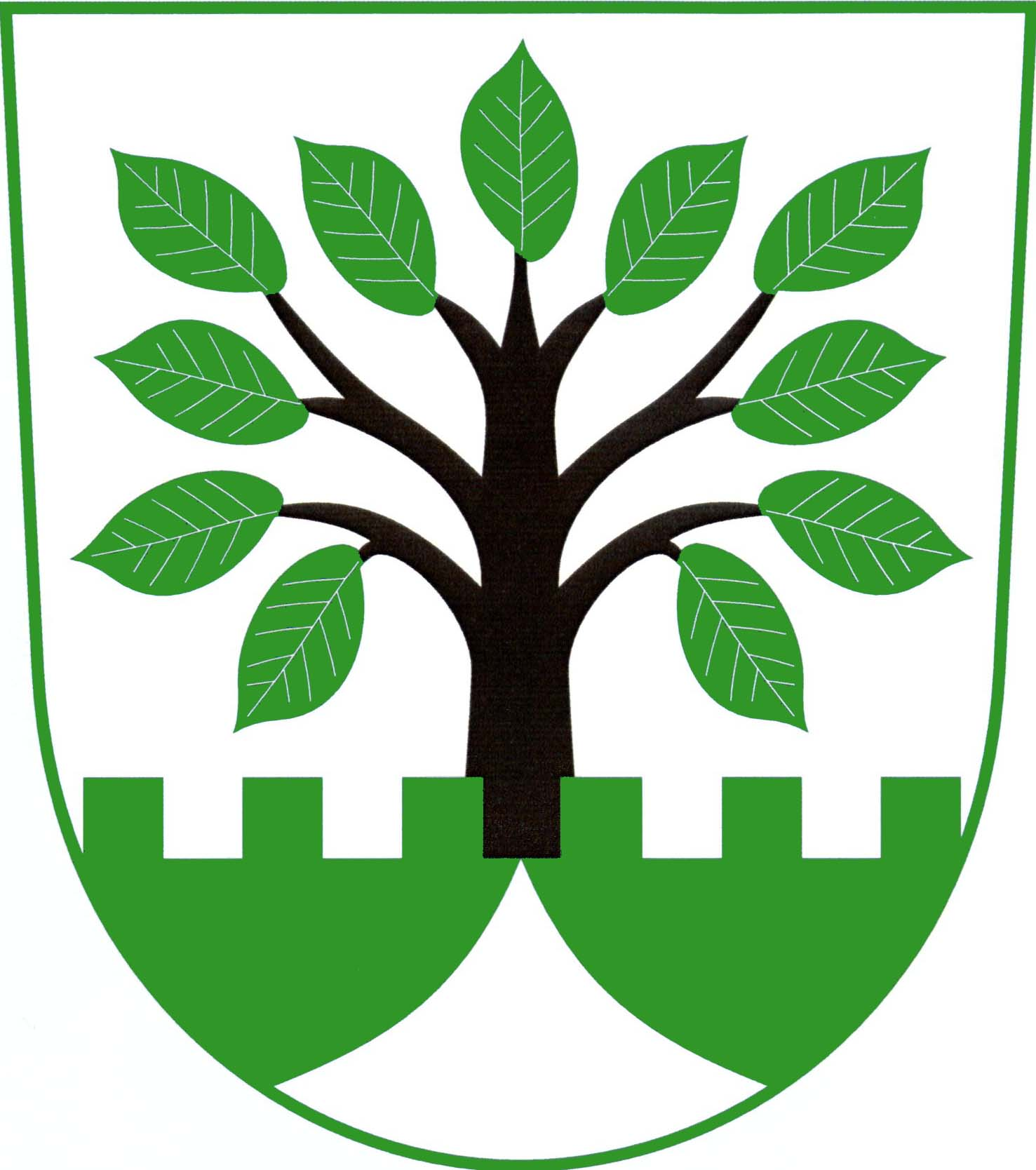
- Flag Coat of arms

- Location in the Czech Republic
- Coordinates: 49°42′48″N 15°35′0″E
- Country: Czech Republic
- Region: Vysočina
- District: Havlíčkův Brod
- First mentioned: 1318

Area
  - Total: 6.44 km^{2} (2.49 sq mi)
- Elevation: 561 m (1,841 ft)

Population (2026-01-01)
  - Total: 155
  - Density: 24.1/km^{2} (62.3/sq mi)
- Time zone: UTC+1 (CET)
  - Summer (DST): UTC+2 (CEST)
- Postal code: 583 01
- Website: www.jilem.eu

Jilem is a municipality and village in Havlíčkův Brod District in the Vysočina Region of the Czech Republic. It has about 200 inhabitants.

Jilem lies approximately 13 kilometres (8 mi) north of Havlíčkův Brod, 36 km (22 mi) north of Jihlava, and 94 km (58 mi) south-east of Prague.

== Demographics ==
Historical population
Year	Pop.	±%
1869	311	—
1880	305	−1.9%
1890	325	+6.6%
1900	311	−4.3%
1910	300	−3.5%
1921	305	+1.7%
1930	250	−18.0%
1950	207	−17.2%
1961	201	−2.9%
1970	174	−13.4%
1980	143	−17.8%
1991	135	−5.6%
2001	127	−5.9%
2011	112	−11.8%
2021	117	+4.5%
Source: Censuses
