= Kaliště (Jihlava District) =

- Municipality
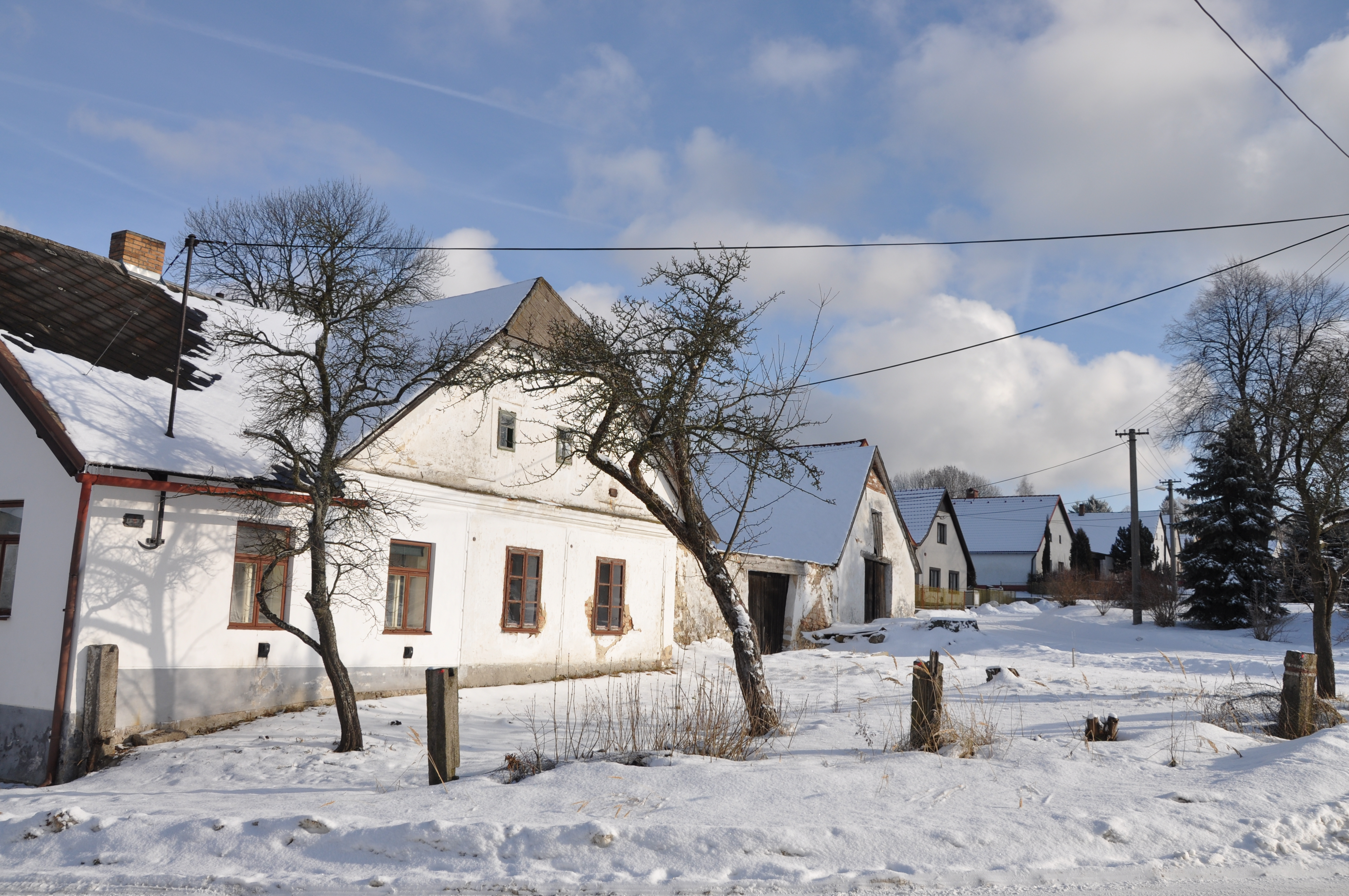
- Centre of Kaliště

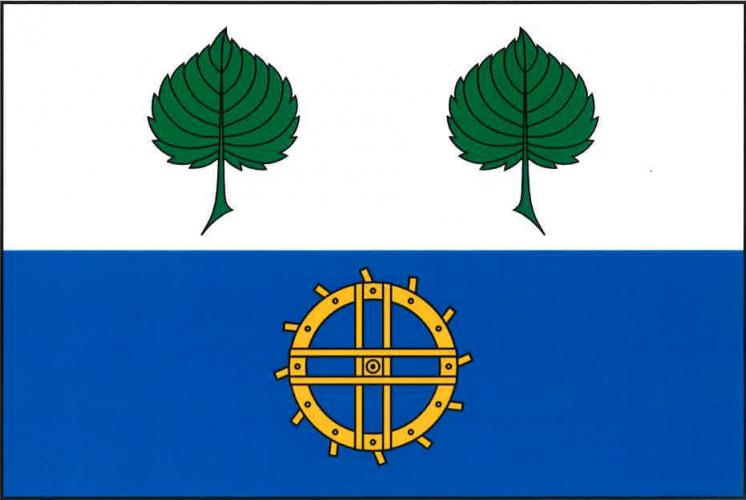
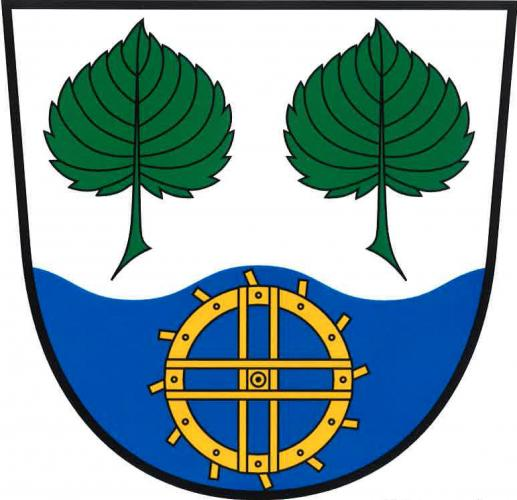
- Flag Coat of arms

- Location in the Czech Republic
- Coordinates: 49°14′29″N 15°18′5″E
- Country: Czech Republic
- Region: Vysočina
- District: Jihlava
- First mentioned: 1407

Area
  - Total: 8.79 km^{2} (3.39 sq mi)
- Elevation: 686 m (2,251 ft)

Population (2026-01-01)
  - Total: 175
  - Density: 19.9/km^{2} (51.6/sq mi)
- Time zone: UTC+1 (CET)
  - Summer (DST): UTC+2 (CEST)
- Postal code: 588 51
- Website: obec-kaliste.cz

Kaliště (Czech pronunciation: [ˈkalɪʃcɛ]) is a municipality and village in Jihlava District in the Vysočina Region of the Czech Republic. It has about 200 inhabitants.

Kaliště lies approximately 27 kilometres (17 mi) south-west of Jihlava and 114 km (71 mi) south-east of Prague.

== Administrative division ==
Kaliště consists of two municipal parts (in brackets population according to the 2021 census):

- Kaliště (127)
- Býkovec (17)

== Demographics ==
Historical population
Year	Pop.	±%
1869	380	—
1880	450	+18.4%
1890	491	+9.1%
1900	499	+1.6%
1910	552	+10.6%
1921	541	−2.0%
1930	552	+2.0%
1950	401	−27.4%
1961	367	−8.5%
1970	316	−13.9%
1980	229	−27.5%
1991	188	−17.9%
2001	180	−4.3%
2011	151	−16.1%
2021	144	−4.6%
Source: Censuses
