= Panské Dubenky =

- Municipality
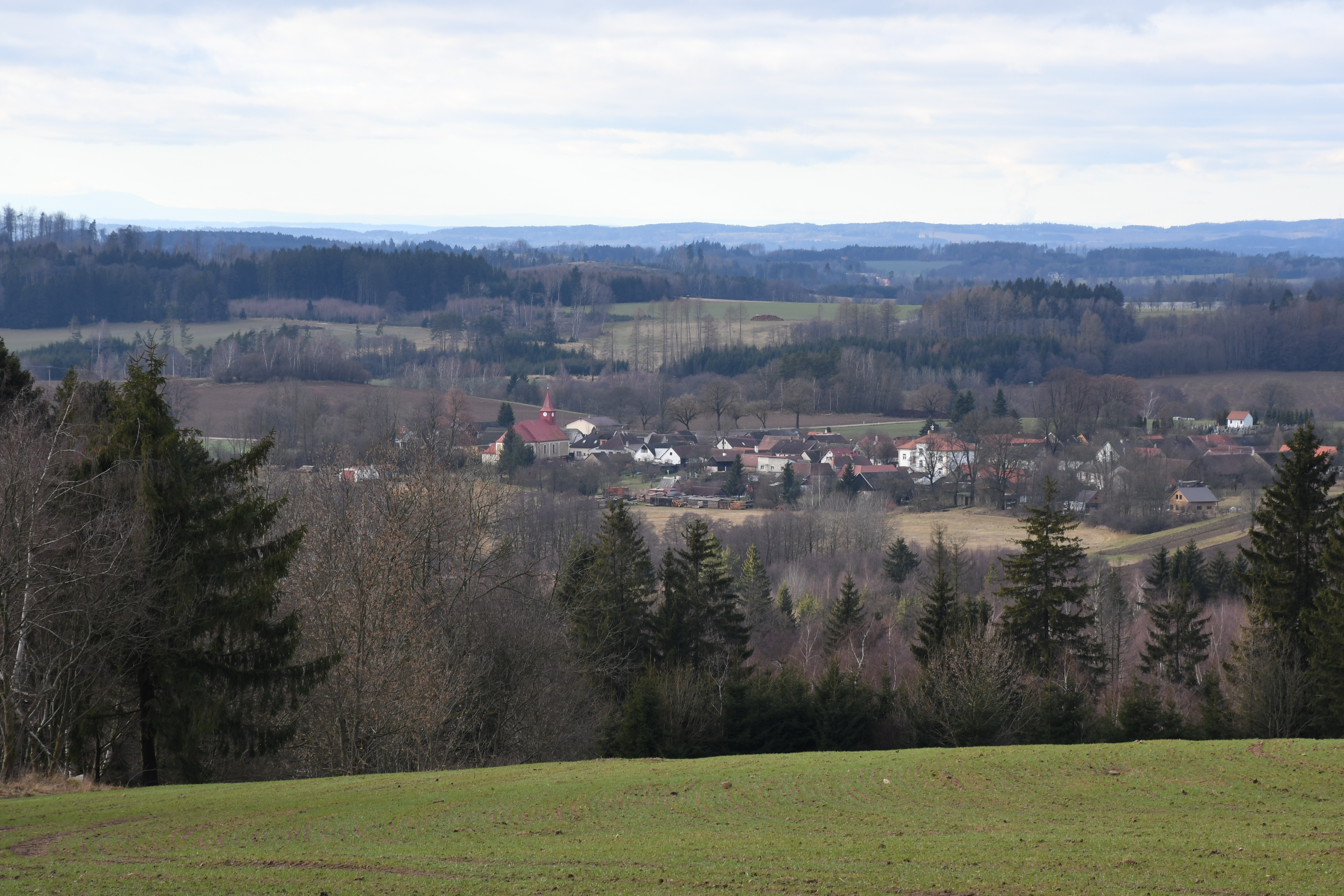
- View from the east

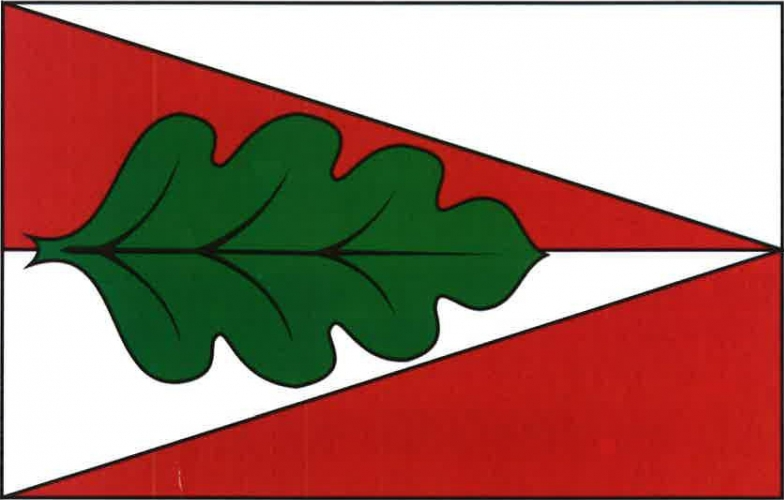
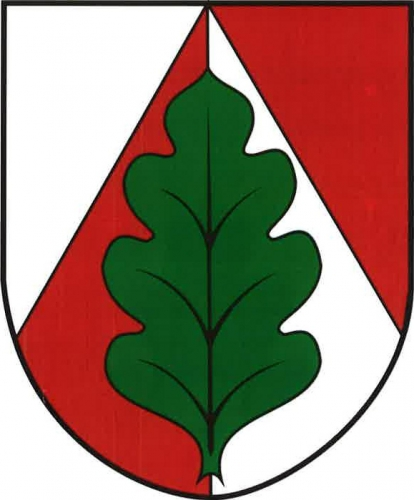
- Flag Coat of arms

- Location in the Czech Republic
- Coordinates: 49°13′11″N 15°15′57″E
- Country: Czech Republic
- Region: Vysočina
- District: Jihlava
- First mentioned: 1350

Area
  - Total: 3.41 km^{2} (1.32 sq mi)
- Elevation: 627 m (2,057 ft)

Population (2026-01-01)
  - Total: 145
  - Density: 42.5/km^{2} (110/sq mi)
- Time zone: UTC+1 (CET)
  - Summer (DST): UTC+2 (CEST)
- Postal code: 588 05
- Website: pdubenky.webnode.cz

Panské Dubenky (Czech pronunciation: [ˈpanskɛː ˈdubɛŋkɪ]) is a municipality and village in Jihlava District in the Vysočina Region of the Czech Republic. It has about 100 inhabitants.

Panské Dubenky lies approximately 31 kilometres (19 mi) south-west of Jihlava and 115 km (71 mi) south-east of Prague.

== Demographics ==
Historical population
Year	Pop.	±%
1869	319	—
1880	328	+2.8%
1890	306	−6.7%
1900	344	+12.4%
1910	372	+8.1%
1921	356	−4.3%
1930	405	+13.8%
1950	255	−37.0%
1961	263	+3.1%
1970	211	−19.8%
1980	168	−20.4%
1991	132	−21.4%
2001	139	+5.3%
2011	98	−29.5%
2021	120	+22.4%
Source: Censuses
