= Blažejov =

- Municipality
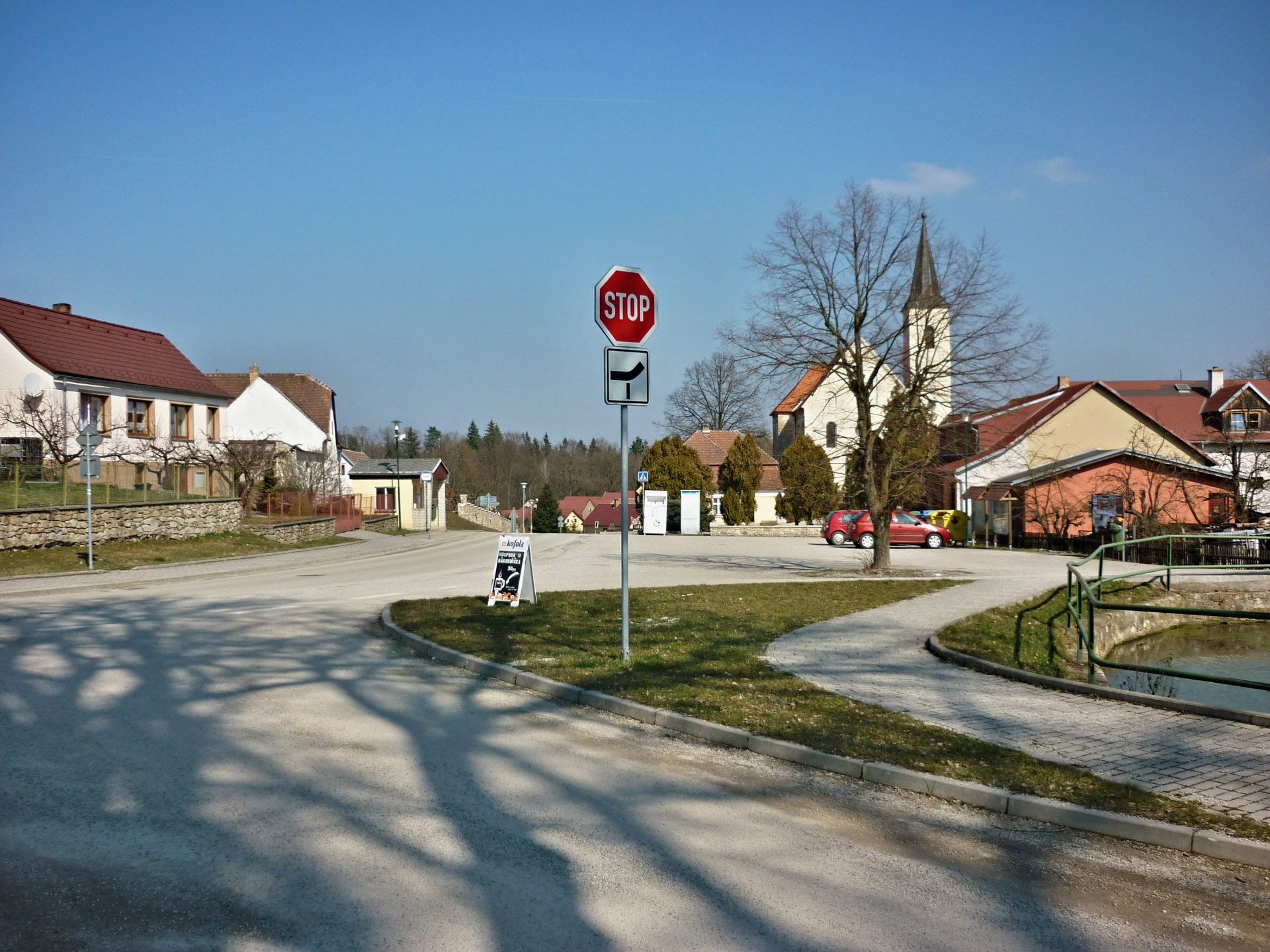
- Centre of Blažejov

- Flag Coat of arms

- Location in the Czech Republic
- Coordinates: 49°8′32″N 15°5′47″E
- Country: Czech Republic
- Region: South Bohemian
- District: Jindřichův Hradec
- First mentioned: 1359

Area
  - Total: 19.89 km^{2} (7.68 sq mi)
- Elevation: 506 m (1,660 ft)

Population (2026-01-01)
  - Total: 479
  - Density: 24.1/km^{2} (62.4/sq mi)
- Time zone: UTC+1 (CET)
  - Summer (DST): UTC+2 (CEST)
- Postal codes: 377 01, 378 52
- Website: www.blazejov.cz

Blažejov (German: Blauenschlag) is a municipality and village in Jindřichův Hradec District in the South Bohemian Region of the Czech Republic. It has about 500 inhabitants.

== Administrative division ==
Blažejov consists of five municipal parts (in brackets population according to the 2021 census):

- Blažejov (279)
- Dvoreček (27)
- Malý Ratmírov (52)
- Mutyněves (42)
- Oldřiš (68)

== Demographics ==
Historical population
Year	Pop.	±%
1869	1,206	—
1880	1,060	−12.1%
1890	971	−8.4%
1900	891	−8.2%
1910	868	−2.6%
1921	922	+6.2%
1930	843	−8.6%
1950	593	−29.7%
1961	516	−13.0%
1970	435	−15.7%
1980	333	−23.4%
1991	292	−12.3%
2001	295	+1.0%
2011	434	+47.1%
2021	468	+7.8%
Source: Censuses
