= Zahrádky (Jindřichův Hradec District) =

- Municipality
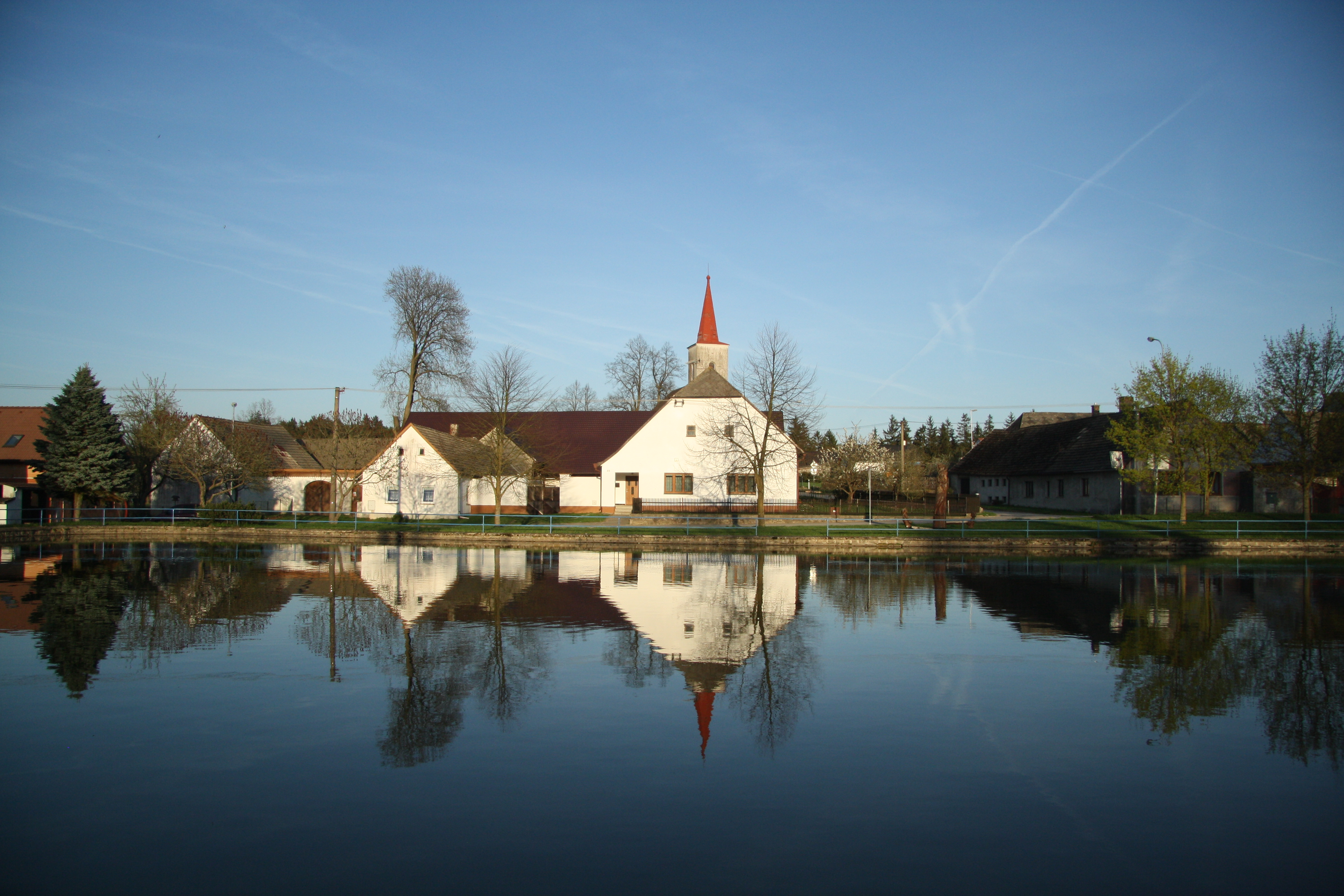
- Centre of Zahrádky

- Location in the Czech Republic
- Coordinates: 49°12′3″N 15°14′30″E
- Country: Czech Republic
- Region: South Bohemian
- District: Jindřichův Hradec
- First mentioned: 1353

Area
  - Total: 8.20 km^{2} (3.17 sq mi)
- Elevation: 594 m (1,949 ft)

Population (2026-01-01)
  - Total: 246
  - Density: 30.0/km^{2} (77.7/sq mi)
- Time zone: UTC+1 (CET)
  - Summer (DST): UTC+2 (CEST)
- Postal code: 378 53
- Website: www.zahradky.cz

Zahrádky is a municipality and village in Jindřichův Hradec District in the South Bohemian Region of the Czech Republic. It has about 200 inhabitants.

Zahrádky lies approximately 19 kilometres (12 mi) east of Jindřichův Hradec, 62 km (39 mi) north-east of České Budějovice, and 115 km (71 mi) south-east of Prague.

== Administrative division ==
Zahrádky consists of two municipal parts (in brackets population according to the 2021 census):

- Zahrádky (226)
- Horní Dvorce (27)

== Demographics ==
Historical population
Year	Pop.	±%
1869	545	—
1880	571	+4.8%
1890	563	−1.4%
1900	586	+4.1%
1910	580	−1.0%
1921	586	+1.0%
1930	569	−2.9%
1950	459	−19.3%
1961	419	−8.7%
1970	372	−11.2%
1980	333	−10.5%
1991	302	−9.3%
2001	246	−18.5%
2011	222	−9.8%
2021	253	+14.0%
Source: Censuses
