= Plavsko =

- Municipality
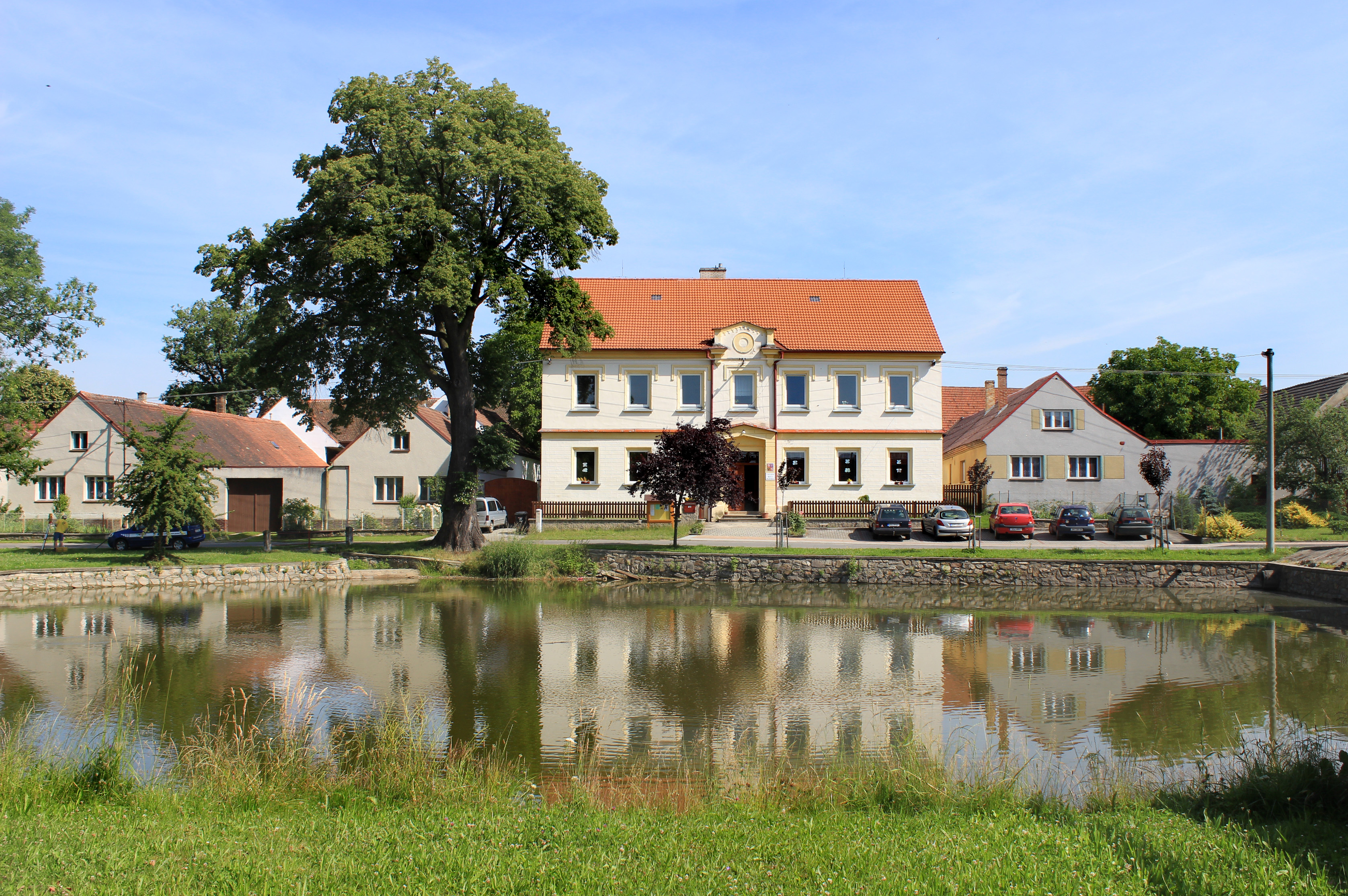
- Primary school

- Flag Coat of arms

- Location in the Czech Republic
- Coordinates: 49°5′5″N 14°54′15″E
- Country: Czech Republic
- Region: South Bohemian
- District: Jindřichův Hradec
- First mentioned: 1279

Area
  - Total: 10.89 km^{2} (4.20 sq mi)
- Elevation: 464 m (1,522 ft)

Population (2026-01-01)
  - Total: 480
  - Density: 44/km^{2} (110/sq mi)
- Time zone: UTC+1 (CET)
  - Summer (DST): UTC+2 (CEST)
- Postal code: 378 02
- Website: www.plavsko.cz

Plavsko is a municipality and village in Jindřichův Hradec District in the South Bohemian Region of the Czech Republic. It has about 500 inhabitants.

Plavsko lies approximately 10 kilometres (6 mi) south-west of Jindřichův Hradec, 34 km (21 mi) east of České Budějovice, and 117 km (73 mi) south of Prague.

== Demographics ==
Historical population
Year	Pop.	±%
1869	655	—
1880	686	+4.7%
1890	665	−3.1%
1900	649	−2.4%
1910	741	+14.2%
1921	771	+4.0%
1930	753	−2.3%
1950	585	−22.3%
1961	562	−3.9%
1970	457	−18.7%
1980	398	−12.9%
1991	414	+4.0%
2001	407	−1.7%
2011	441	+8.4%
2021	432	−2.0%
Source: Censuses
