= Těmice (Pelhřimov District) =

- Municipality
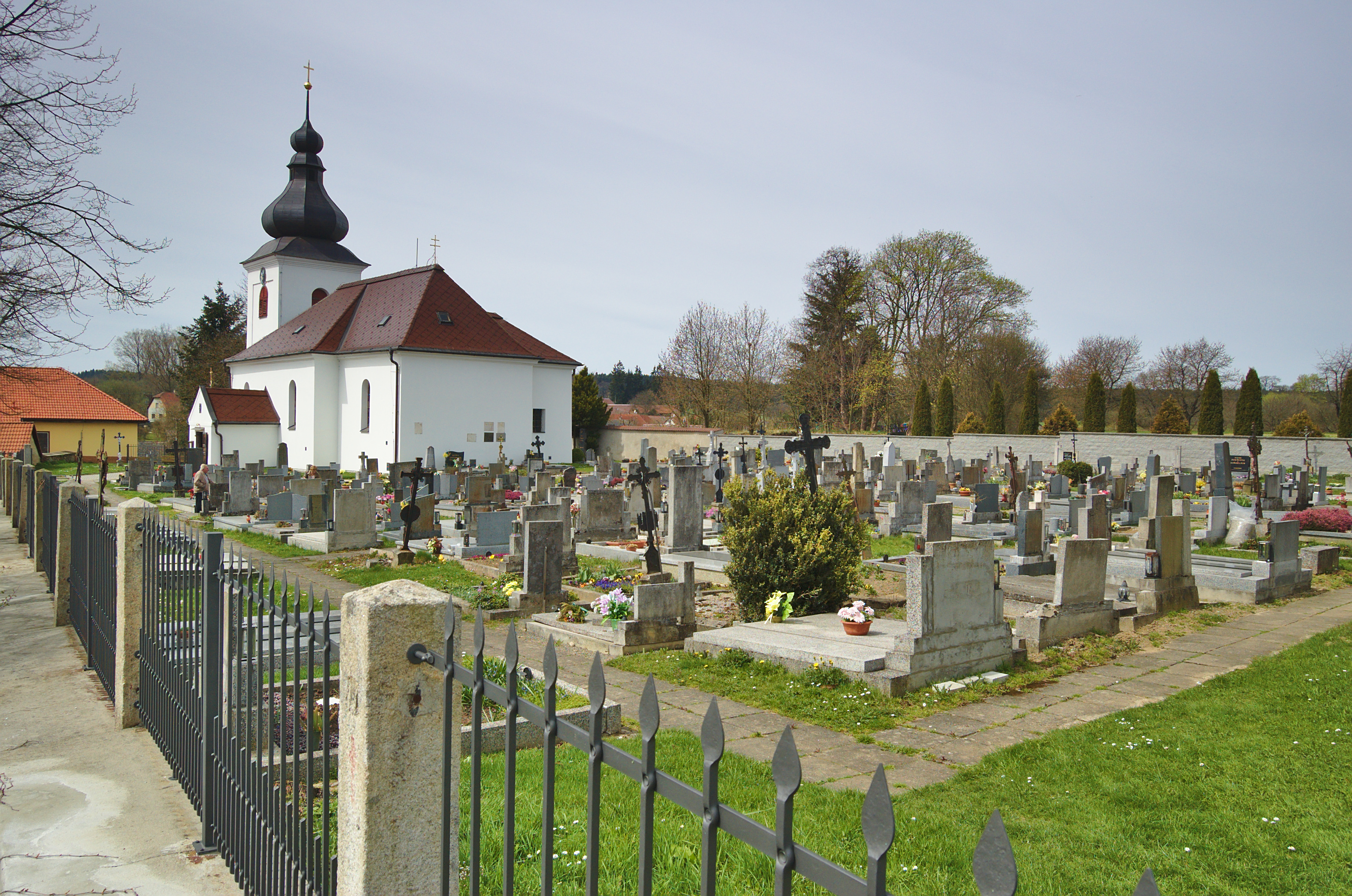
- Church of Saint John the Baptist

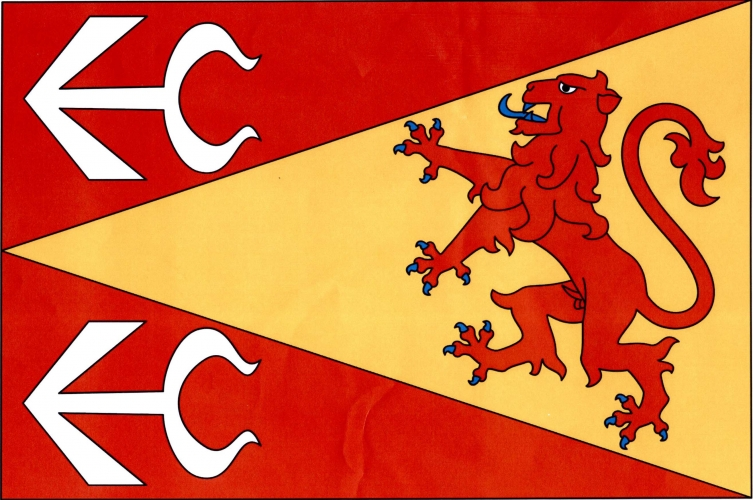
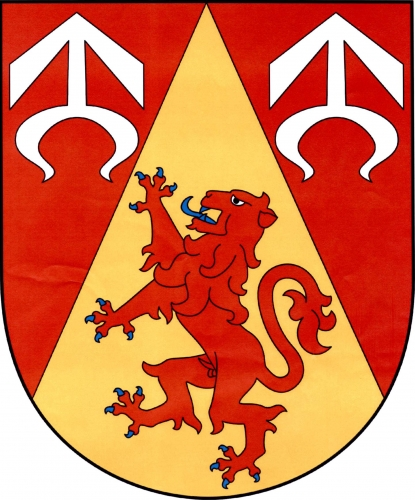
- Flag Coat of arms

- Location in the Czech Republic
- Coordinates: 49°21′7″N 15°3′38″E
- Country: Czech Republic
- Region: Vysočina
- District: Pelhřimov
- First mentioned: 1359

Area
  - Total: 28.58 km^{2} (11.03 sq mi)
- Elevation: 628 m (2,060 ft)

Population (2026-01-01)
  - Total: 418
  - Density: 14.6/km^{2} (37.9/sq mi)
- Time zone: UTC+1 (CET)
  - Summer (DST): UTC+2 (CEST)
- Postal codes: 394 70, 394 96
- Website: www.obectemice.cz

Těmice (German: Temnitz) is a municipality and village in Pelhřimov District in the Vysočina Region of the Czech Republic. It has about 400 inhabitants.

Těmice lies approximately 16 kilometres (10 mi) south-west of Pelhřimov, 40 kilometres (25 mi) west of Jihlava, and 94 kilometres (58 mi) south-east of Prague.

== Administrative division ==
Těmice consists of six municipal parts (in brackets population according to the 2021 census):

- Těmice (264)
- Babín (45)
- Drahoňov (18)
- Dráchov (54)
- Knížata (1)
- Nový Drahoňov (5)

== Demographics ==
Historical population
Year	Pop.	±%
1869	1,269	—
1880	1,268	−0.1%
1890	1,388	+9.5%
1900	1,284	−7.5%
1910	1,315	+2.4%
1921	1,299	−1.2%
1930	1,175	−9.5%
1950	816	−30.6%
1961	837	+2.6%
1970	673	−19.6%
1980	561	−16.6%
1991	432	−23.0%
2001	401	−7.2%
2011	385	−4.0%
2021	387	+0.5%
Source: Censuses
