= Rodvínov =

- Municipality
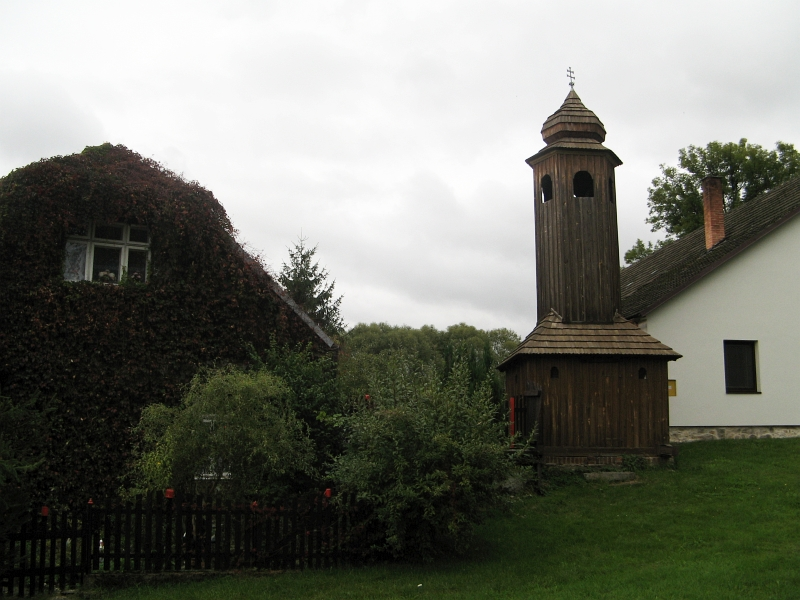
- Wooden bell tower

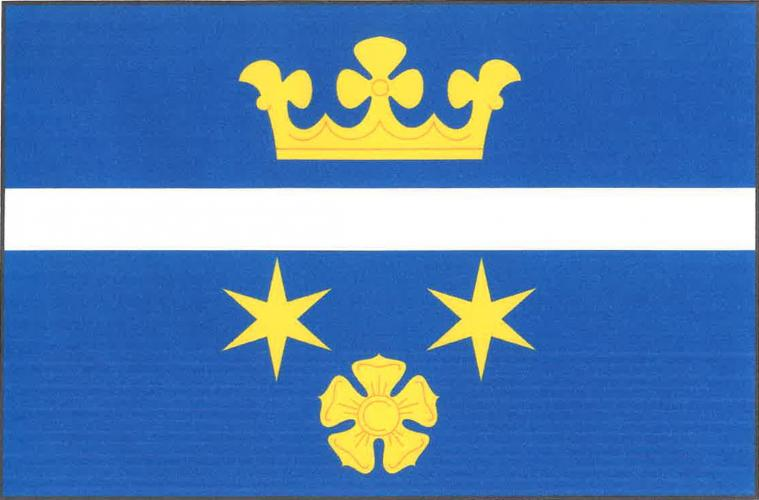
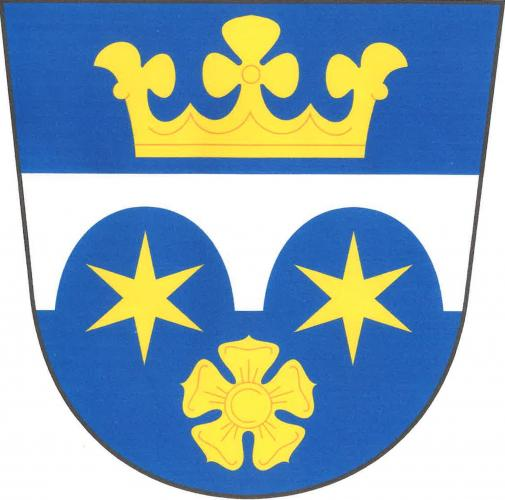
- Flag Coat of arms

- Location in the Czech Republic
- Coordinates: 49°10′16″N 15°3′25″E
- Country: Czech Republic
- Region: South Bohemian
- District: Jindřichův Hradec
- First mentioned: 1319

Area
  - Total: 12.72 km^{2} (4.91 sq mi)
- Elevation: 475 m (1,558 ft)

Population (2026-01-01)
  - Total: 638
  - Density: 50.2/km^{2} (130/sq mi)
- Time zone: UTC+1 (CET)
  - Summer (DST): UTC+2 (CEST)
- Postal code: 377 01
- Website: www.rodvinov.cz

Rodvínov is a municipality and village in Jindřichův Hradec District in the South Bohemian Region of the Czech Republic. It has about 600 inhabitants.

Rodvínov lies approximately 5 kilometres (3 mi) north-east of Jindřichův Hradec, 48 km (30 mi) north-east of České Budějovice, and 112 km (70 mi) south-east of Prague.

== Administrative division ==
Rodvínov consists of two municipal parts (in brackets population according to the 2021 census):

- Rodvínov (364)
- Jindřiš (255)

== Demographics ==
Historical population
Year	Pop.	±%
1869	505	—
1880	540	+6.9%
1890	544	+0.7%
1900	505	−7.2%
1910	555	+9.9%
1921	548	−1.3%
1930	535	−2.4%
1950	379	−29.2%
1961	395	+4.2%
1970	396	+0.3%
1980	336	−15.2%
1991	371	+10.4%
2001	392	+5.7%
2011	472	+20.4%
2021	619	+31.1%
Source: Censuses
