= Jilem (Jindřichův Hradec District) =

- Municipality
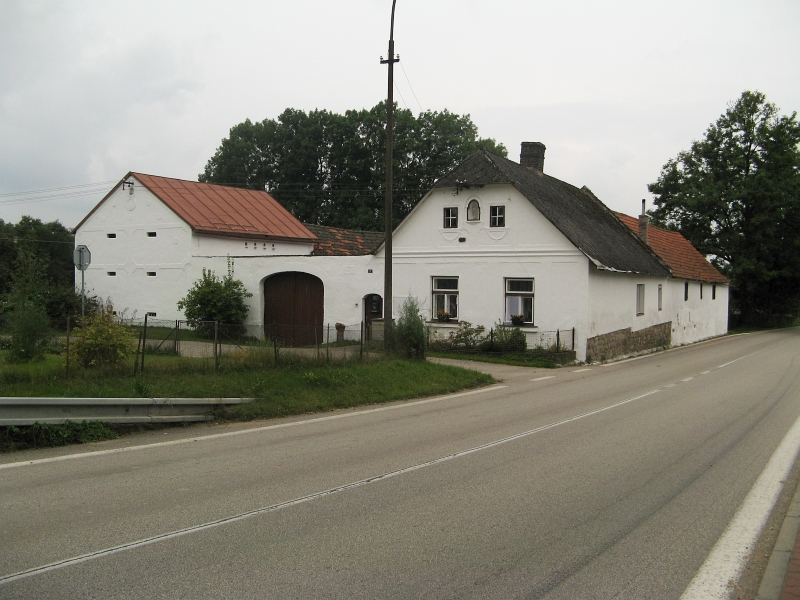
- House No. 13, a cultural monument

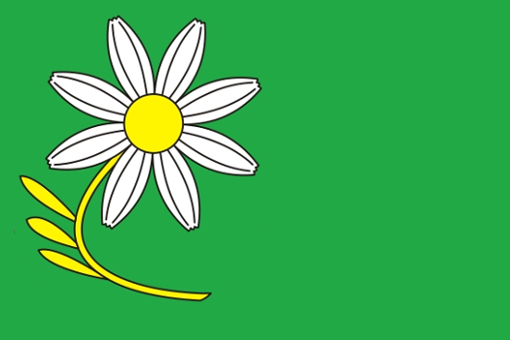
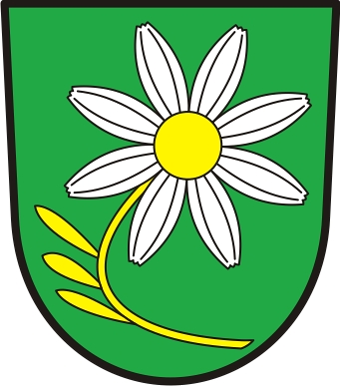
- Flag Coat of arms

- Location in the Czech Republic
- Coordinates: 49°10′36″N 15°16′8″E
- Country: Czech Republic
- Region: South Bohemian
- District: Jindřichův Hradec
- First mentioned: 1358

Area
  - Total: 4.55 km^{2} (1.76 sq mi)
- Elevation: 614 m (2,014 ft)

Population (2026-01-01)
  - Total: 136
  - Density: 29.9/km^{2} (77.4/sq mi)
- Time zone: UTC+1 (CET)
  - Summer (DST): UTC+2 (CEST)
- Postal code: 378 53, 378 56
- Website: www.obecjilem.cz

Jilem is a municipality and village in Jindřichův Hradec District in the South Bohemian Region of the Czech Republic. It has about 100 inhabitants.

Jilem lies approximately 20 kilometres (12 mi) east of Jindřichův Hradec, 62 km (39 mi) east of České Budějovice, and 119 km (74 mi) south-east of Prague.

== Demographics ==
Historical population
| Year | Pop. | ±% |
|---|---|---|
| 1869 | 267 | — |
| 1880 | 283 | +6.0% |
| 1890 | 259 | −8.5% |
| 1900 | 256 | −1.2% |
| 1910 | 256 | +0.0% |
| 1921 | 250 | −2.3% |
| 1930 | 248 | −0.8% |
| 1950 | 188 | −24.2% |
| 1961 | 201 | +6.9% |
| 1970 | 152 | −24.4% |
| 1980 | 139 | −8.6% |
| 1991 | 147 | +5.8% |
| 2001 | 120 | −18.4% |
| 2011 | 103 | −14.2% |
| 2021 | 123 | +19.4% |
Source: Censuses
