= Včelnička =

- Municipality
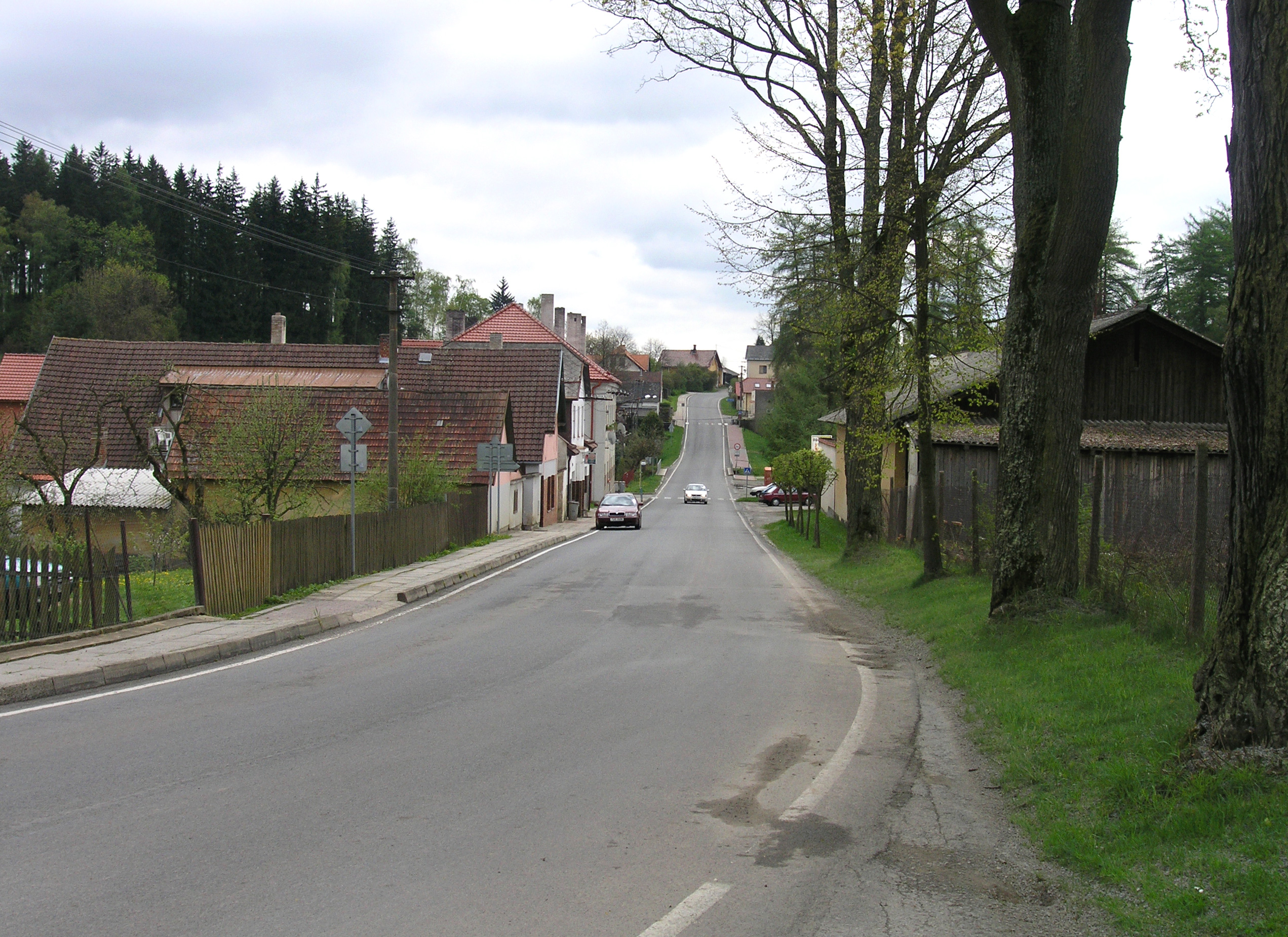
- Main street

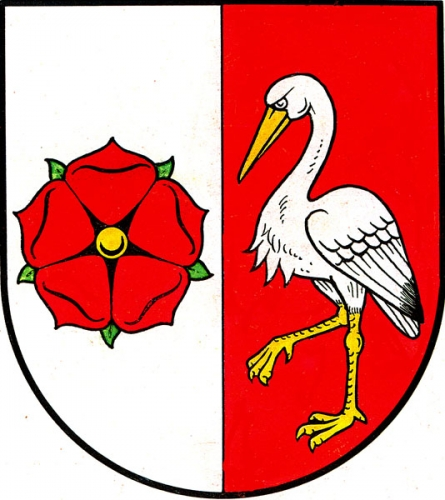
- Coat of arms

- Location in the Czech Republic
- Coordinates: 49°18′16″N 15°2′33″E
- Country: Czech Republic
- Region: Vysočina
- District: Pelhřimov
- First mentioned: 1379

Area
  - Total: 3.95 km^{2} (1.53 sq mi)
- Elevation: 555 m (1,821 ft)

Population (2026-01-01)
  - Total: 271
  - Density: 68.6/km^{2} (178/sq mi)
- Time zone: UTC+1 (CET)
  - Summer (DST): UTC+2 (CEST)
- Postal code: 394 70
- Website: vcelnicka.cz

Včelnička (German: Bienental) is a municipality and village in Pelhřimov District in the Vysočina Region of the Czech Republic. It has about 300 inhabitants.

== Etymology ==
The name is a diminutive of 'Včelnice'.

== Geography ==
Včelnička is located about 19 kilometres (12 mi) southwest of Pelhřimov and 40 km (25 mi) west of Jihlava. It lies in the Křemešník Highlands. The highest point is the hill Ve Vrších at 642 m (2,106 ft) above sea level. The Včelnička Stream flows through the municipality and supplies the fishpond Sýkorák, located northeast of the village.

== History ==
The first written mention of Včelnička is from 1379, when it was part of the Choustník estate, owned by the Rosenberg family. From 1643 until the establishment of an independent municipality, Včelnička was a part of the Černovice estate.

== Demographics ==
Historical population

Year	Pop.	±%
1869	380	—
1880	480	+26.3%
1890	524	+9.2%
1900	573	+9.4%
1910	401	−30.0%

Year	Pop.	±%
1921	371	−7.5%
1930	349	−5.9%
1950	298	−14.6%
1961	334	+12.1%
1970	296	−11.4%

Year	Pop.	±%
1980	215	−27.4%
1991	186	−13.5%
2001	196	+5.4%
2011	179	−8.7%
2021	236	+31.8%

Source: Censuses

== Transport ==
Včelnička is located on the Jindřichův Hradec narrow-gauge railway, leading from Jindřichův Hradec to Obrataň. It serves mostly as a tourist attraction.

== Sights ==
The only protected cultural monument in the municipality is a cast iron crucifix from 1822.
