= Kostelní Radouň =

- Municipality
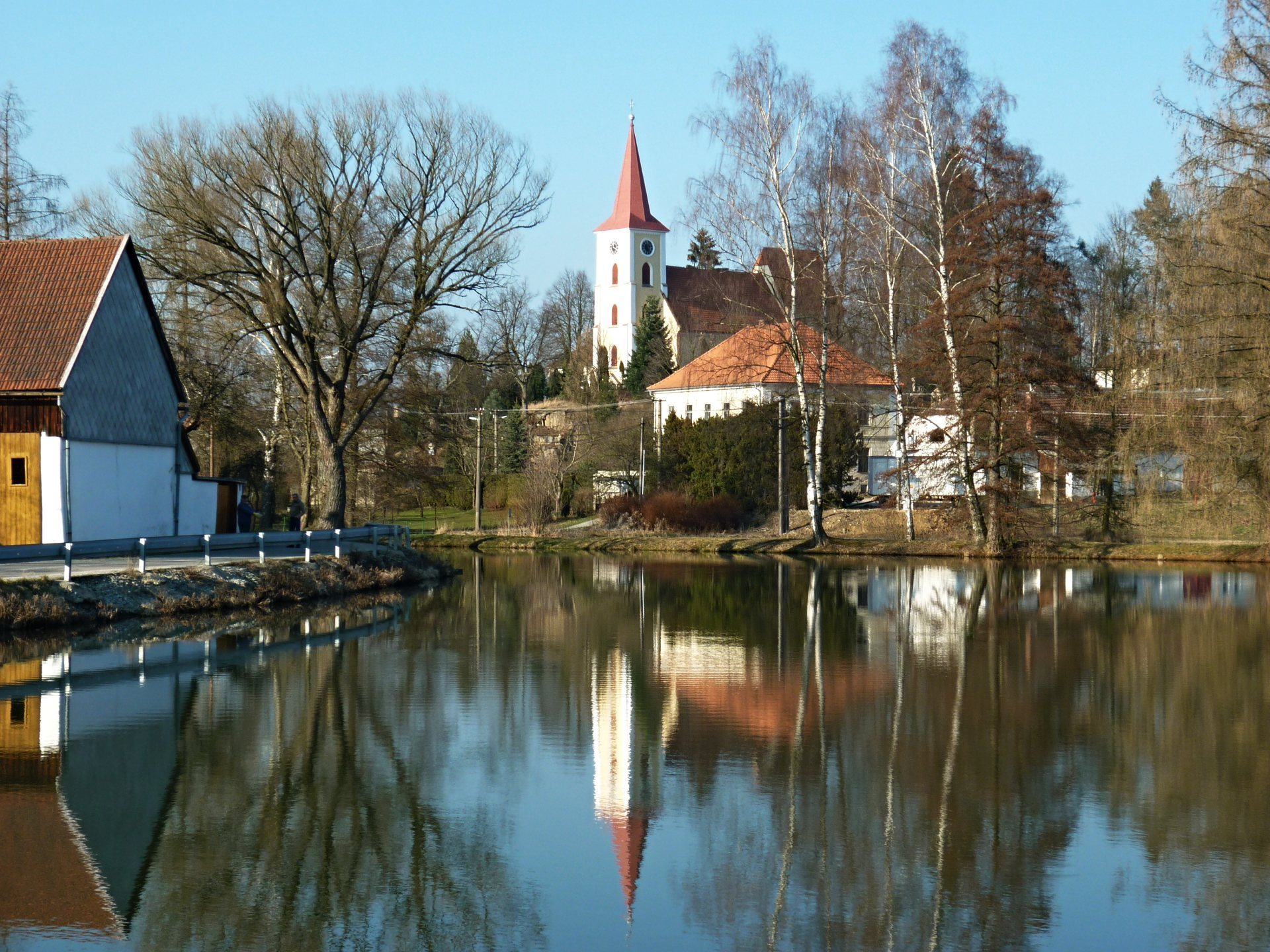
- Church of Saint Vitus seen across the pond

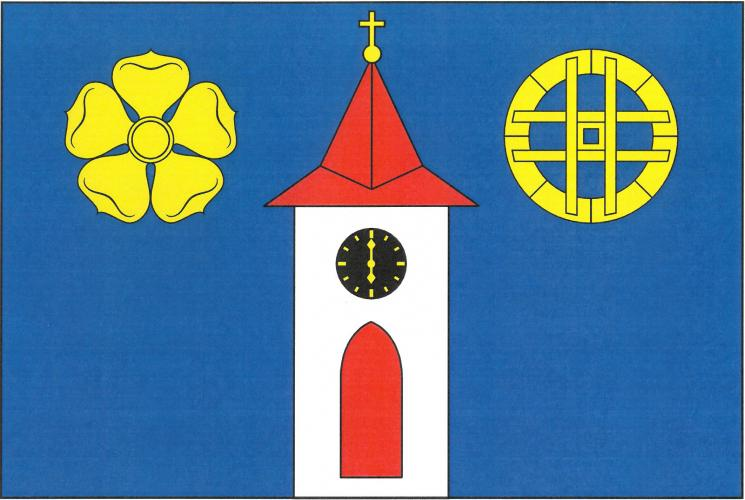
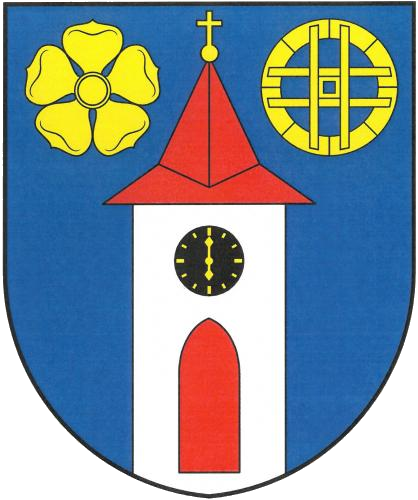
- Flag Coat of arms

- Location in the Czech Republic
- Coordinates: 49°13′32″N 15°0′31″E
- Country: Czech Republic
- Region: South Bohemian
- District: Jindřichův Hradec
- First mentioned: 1296

Area
  - Total: 5.91 km^{2} (2.28 sq mi)
- Elevation: 513 m (1,683 ft)

Population (2026-01-01)
  - Total: 298
  - Density: 50.4/km^{2} (131/sq mi)
- Time zone: UTC+1 (CET)
  - Summer (DST): UTC+2 (CEST)
- Postal code: 378 42
- Website: www.kostelniradoun.cz

Kostelní Radouň (German: Kirchen Radaun) is a municipality and village in Jindřichův Hradec District in the South Bohemian Region of the Czech Republic. It has about 300 inhabitants.

== Etymology ==
The name Radouň is derived from the personal name Radoun (Radún), meaning "Radoun's village". The adjective kostelní, which was used to distinguish it from places with the same name, means 'church'.

== Geography ==
Kostelní Radouň is located about 9 kilometres (6 mi) northeast of Jindřichův Hradec and 47 km (29 mi) northeast of České Budějovice. It lies in the Křemešník Highlands. The highest point is at 619 m (2,031 ft) above sea level. The stream Radouňský potok flows through the municipality. There are several fishponds in the municipal territory.

== History ==
The first written mention of Kostelní Radouň is from 1296. It was founded during the colonisation of the region in the 13th century. Before 1672, it was part of the Kamenice estate. From 1672, the village belonged to the Nová Včelnice estate.

== Demographics ==
Historical population

Year	Pop.	±%
1869	490	—
1880	520	+6.1%
1890	543	+4.4%
1900	526	−3.1%
1910	526	+0.0%

Year	Pop.	±%
1921	519	−1.3%
1930	479	−7.7%
1950	376	−21.5%
1961	382	+1.6%
1970	316	−17.3%

Year	Pop.	±%
1980	291	−7.9%
1991	266	−8.6%
2001	245	−7.9%
2011	291	+18.8%
2021	302	+3.8%

Source: Censuses

== Transport ==
There are no railways or major roads passing through the municipality.

== Sights ==
The main landmark is the Church of Saint Vitus. It was built before 1344. In 1672, the navy was rebuilt. The tower was added in 1857. In 1876, the church was rebuilt into its present neo-Gothic form. The church has a preserved Gothic core, represented by the presbytery with the sacristy.
