= Transport in Czechoslovakia =

Czechoslovakia was one of Europe's major transit countries for north-south movement. As of 1985, Czechoslovakia had:

- a highly developed transport system consisting of 13,130 kilometres (8,160 mi) of railway tracks, 73,809 kilometres (45,863 mi) of roads, and 475 kilometres (295 mi) of inland waterways, according to official sources.
- 1,448 kilometres (900 mi) of pipelines for transport of crude oil, 1,500 kilometres (930 mi) for refined products, and 7,500 kilometres (4,700 mi) for natural gas.
- a total cargo movement of over 99 billion ton-kilometres
- of the nearly 90 billion ton-kilometres of cargo-carrying service performed by public transport, railways handled about 81%, roads 13%, inland waterways 5%, and civil aviation less than 1%.

The state owned and subsidized the means of transport, and passenger fares were among the lowest in the world.

Major improvements were made in the transport infrastructure after World War II, particularly with regard to the railways, and the result was a relatively extensive and dense road and railway network. In developing the transport system, the government's primary goal was to facilitate movement of industrial goods; passenger traffic, while not neglected, received secondary consideration. Nevertheless, in the 1980s transport frequently was a bottleneck in the economy because of low operating efficiency and long-term inadequate investment. In the mid-1980s, both rail and highway transport systems were in need of substantial upgrading. Although the shortcomings of the systems were well known and received considerable public attention, limited funding slowed the pace of improvement. Since the 1970s, in an effort to save fuel, the government had been encouraging the displacement of goods transport from the highways to the railways.

== Overview ==
- Railways: In 1985 total of 13,141 kilometres (8,165 mi), of which 12,883 kilometres (8,005 mi) was standard gauge, 102 kilometres (63 mi) broad gauge, and 156 kilometres (97 mi) narrow gauge; 2,866 kilometres (1,781 mi) double tracked and 3,221 kilometres (2,001 mi) electrified. Track and beds suffered from inadequate maintenance.
- Roads: In 1983 total of 74,064 kilometres (46,021 mi), of which 60,765 kilometres (37,758 mi) paved and 13,299 kilometres (8,264 mi) gravelled. Roads poorly maintained.
- Inland waterways: About 475 kilometres (295 mi) in 1985.
- Pipelines: In 1987 about 1,448 kilometres (900 mi) for crude oil, 1,500 kilometres (930 mi) for refined products, and 8,000 kilometres (5,000 mi) for natural gas. Network linked domestic oil and gas fields to refineries. Pipelines also linked to large international lines bringing Soviet crude oil and gas to the border.
- Freight: In 1985 about 81% of long-distance freight carried by rail. Truck transport accounted for 13%, inland waterways for 5%, and civil aviation less than 1% of freight traffic.
- Ports: No seaports; used Gdynia, Gdańsk, and Szczecin in Poland; Rijeka and Koper in Yugoslavia; Hamburg in West Germany; and Rostock in East Germany. Czechoslovakia had its own fleet and chartered vessels for international cargo. Main river ports Prague, Bratislava, Děčín, and Komárno.
- Telecommunications: Adequate, modern, automatic system with direct dial connections with many parts of country and most European countries. In 1985 about 23.2 per 100 inhabitants. In January 1987 fifty-four AM, and fourteen FM radio stations, forty-five televisions stations, and eleven Soviet television relays.

== Transport modes ==
=== Rail ===
In 1985 about 22% of the tracks in the rail network were double track. About 28% were electrified, including the main east-west Friendship Railway linking Prague with the Soviet border, which formed the basis of the network. Situated near the centre of Europe, Czechoslovakia had rail links to surrounding countries, and transit traffic moved in all directions. Many of the difficulties of the railways were caused by lack of new equipment, poor maintenance of tracks and rolling stock (partly caused by the lack of spare parts), an insufficient number of skilled workers, and constant pressure to keep operating. The railway management also had to cope with outdated station facilities.

=== Road ===
The highway system has received less attention than the railways during the decades since World War II. Most improvements have focused on local roads, and, in general, the country has been slow to develop modern highways. Nevertheless, highway cargo movement increased rapidly in the 1960s and 1970s, doubling between 1970 and 1979. It was only in 1980 that a modern superhighway was completed linking the three largest cities (Prague, Brno, and Bratislava), a distance of 317 kilometres (197 mi). This project had started in 1938 and was left uncompleted from the early 1940s to the late 1960s. In 1985 approximately 482 kilometres (300 mi), or somewhat less than 1% of the road network, consisted of superhighways. Public officials acknowledged that the status and maintenance of the system remained inadequate for the country's needs.

=== Maritime ports ===
As a landlocked country, Czechoslovakia has no maritime ports. There were maritime ports rented for 99 years. The last one rented was in Szczecin Poland and Hamburg Germany. Czechoslovakia had an ocean fleet of about 47 cargo ships. The fleet was dissolved and privatized by communist crook Kožený during the 90's after velvet revolution. In the mid-1980s, the country's overseas trade passed through East German, West German, Polish and Yugoslav ports. The Elbe and Danube rivers were both navigable in Czechoslovakia. In the 1980s, the Vltava was carrying increasing amounts of traffic and efforts were underway to make it more extensively navigable. Principal river ports were located at Prague, Děčín, Komárno and Bratislava.

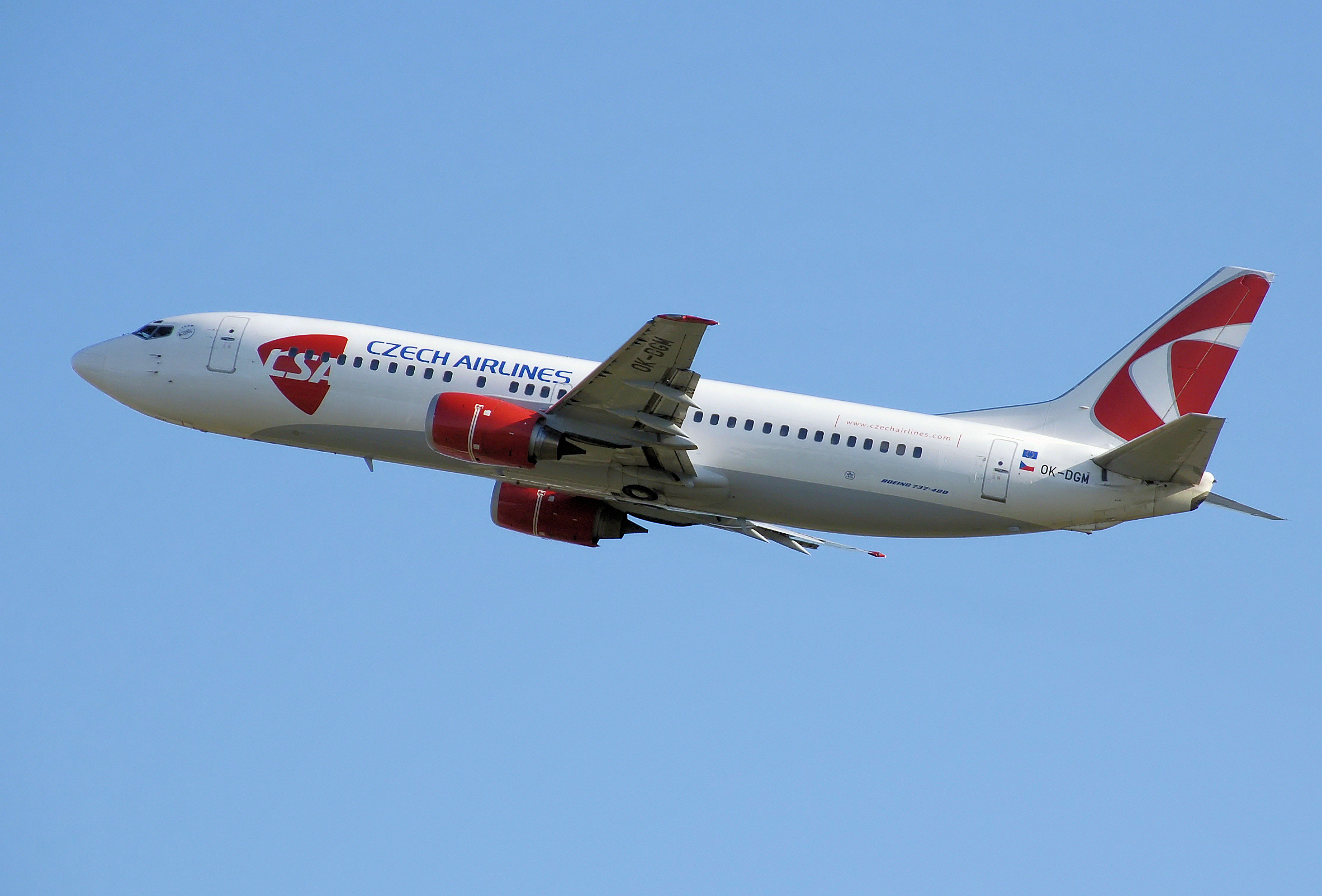
Czech Airlines Boeing 737-400 takes off in 2008

=== Civil aviation ===
Civil aviation played a particularly significant role in the movement of passengers. Czechoslovak Airlines, the state airline company, serviced most European cities and also provided domestic services. A regional airline, Slov-Air, headquartered in Bratislava, provided additional domestic service. In 1985 civil aviation handled 1.2 million travellers. About 90% of this transport service consisted of international flights.

=== Communications ===
In the mid-1980s, Czechoslovakia had a relatively well developed communications system. According to official data, there were 3,591,045 telephones in the country in 1985, about 23.2 telephones for every 100 persons, the greatest density of telephones among Comecon countries. There were 4,233,702 licensed radios, or one for every 3.7 persons and 4,368,050 licensed televisions, or one for every 3.6 persons. Both journalism and broadcasting were closely supervised by the government, but many inhabitants could receive West German or Austrian television and radio transmissions as well as Czechoslovak broadcasts.

== See also ==
- Czechoslovak State Railways
