= Narrow-gauge railways in the Czech Republic =

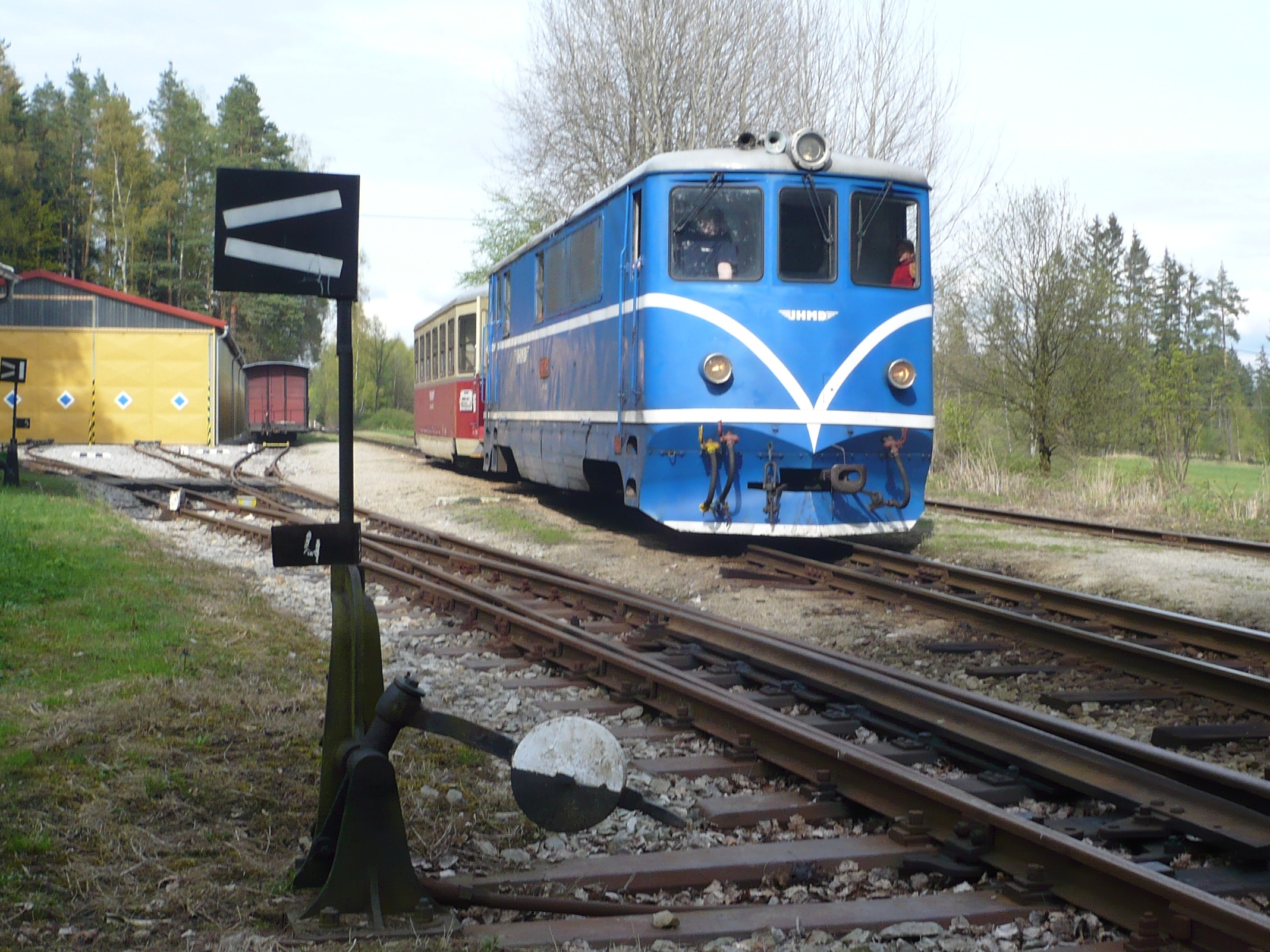
T47.015 with train from Obrataň to Jindřichův Hradec

The Czech Republic formerly had a large number of narrow-gauge railways. Apart from the public lines listed below, there were many non-public industrial, forest and agricultural narrow-gauge systems; only a few of these are still running.

== Current public lines ==
- Obrataň–Jindřichův Hradec–Nová Bystřice; gauge 760 mm (2 ft 5 15/16 in), total length 79 kilometres (49 mi), 30 stations and stops, partly operated by steam locomotives, maximum permitted speed 50 kilometres per hour (31 mph), privately owned by Gepard Express
- Třemešná ve Slezsku–Osoblaha; gauge 760 mm (2 ft 5 15/16 in), total length 20 km, maximum permitted speed 40 kilometres per hour (25 mph), infrastructure operator is Správa železnic, regular passenger trains are operated by České dráhy
- Part of tram network in Liberec built in dual gauge and used occasionally by heritage 1,000 mm (3 ft 3 3/8 in) gauge rolling stock

In 2024, the interurban Liberec–Jablonec and Nisou tram line was regauged to 1,435 mm (4 ft 8 1/2 in) gauge.

== Abandoned public lines ==
- Frýdlant–Heřmanice; 1900–1976; gauge 750 mm (2 ft 5 1/2 in), used to be connected to Zittau–Reichenau line
- Moravský Beroun–Dvorce; 1898–1933; gauge 760 mm (2 ft 5 15/16 in) (cs)
- Most–Litvínov–Janov; 7 Aug 1901 – 24 Mar 1961; gauge 1,000 mm (3 ft 3 3/8 in), operated by trams
- Network of 760 mm (2 ft 5 15/16 in) gauge tram lines around Ostrava, Bohumín, Orlová and Karviná; 1902–1973 (last remaining line closed)
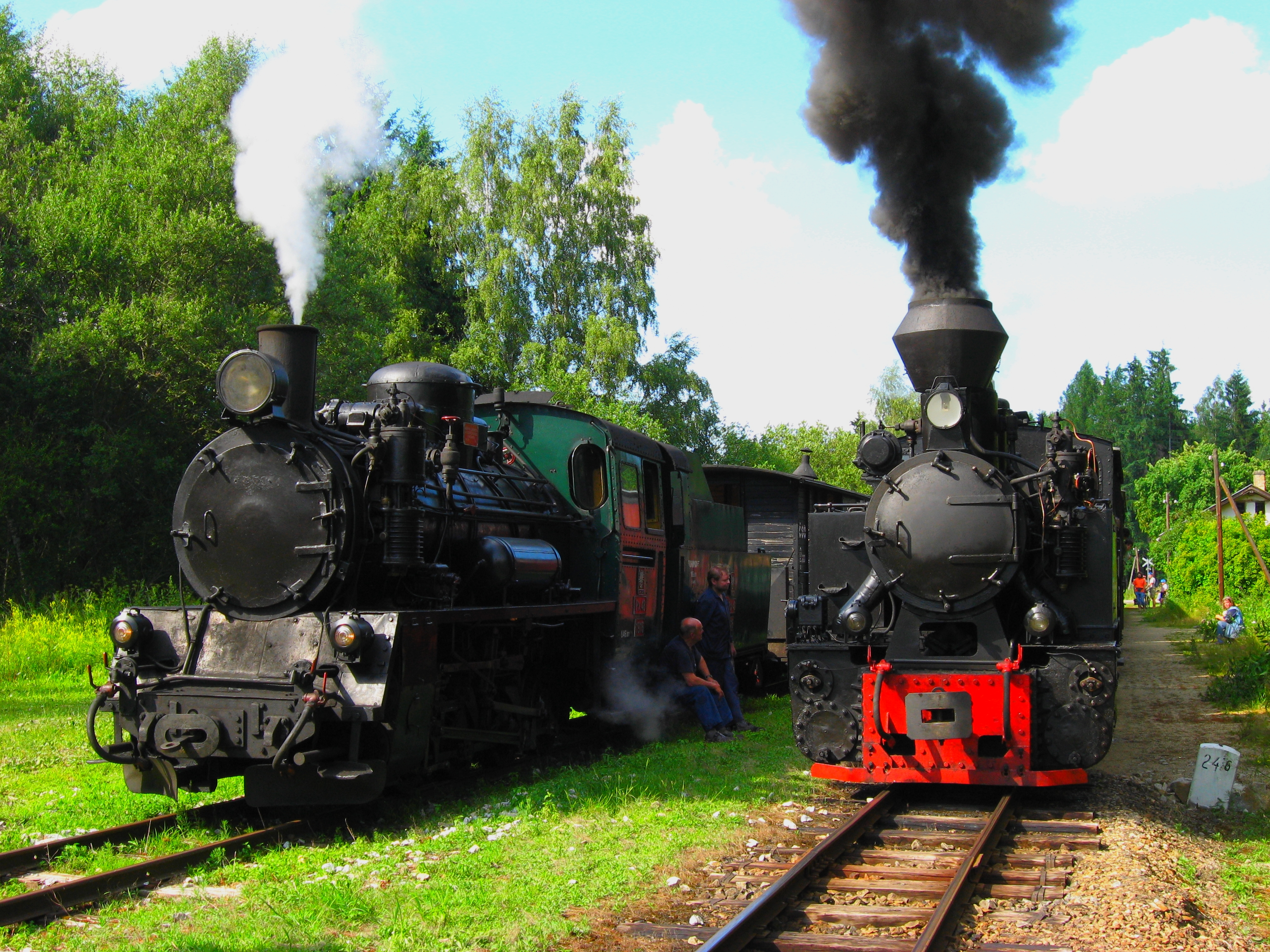

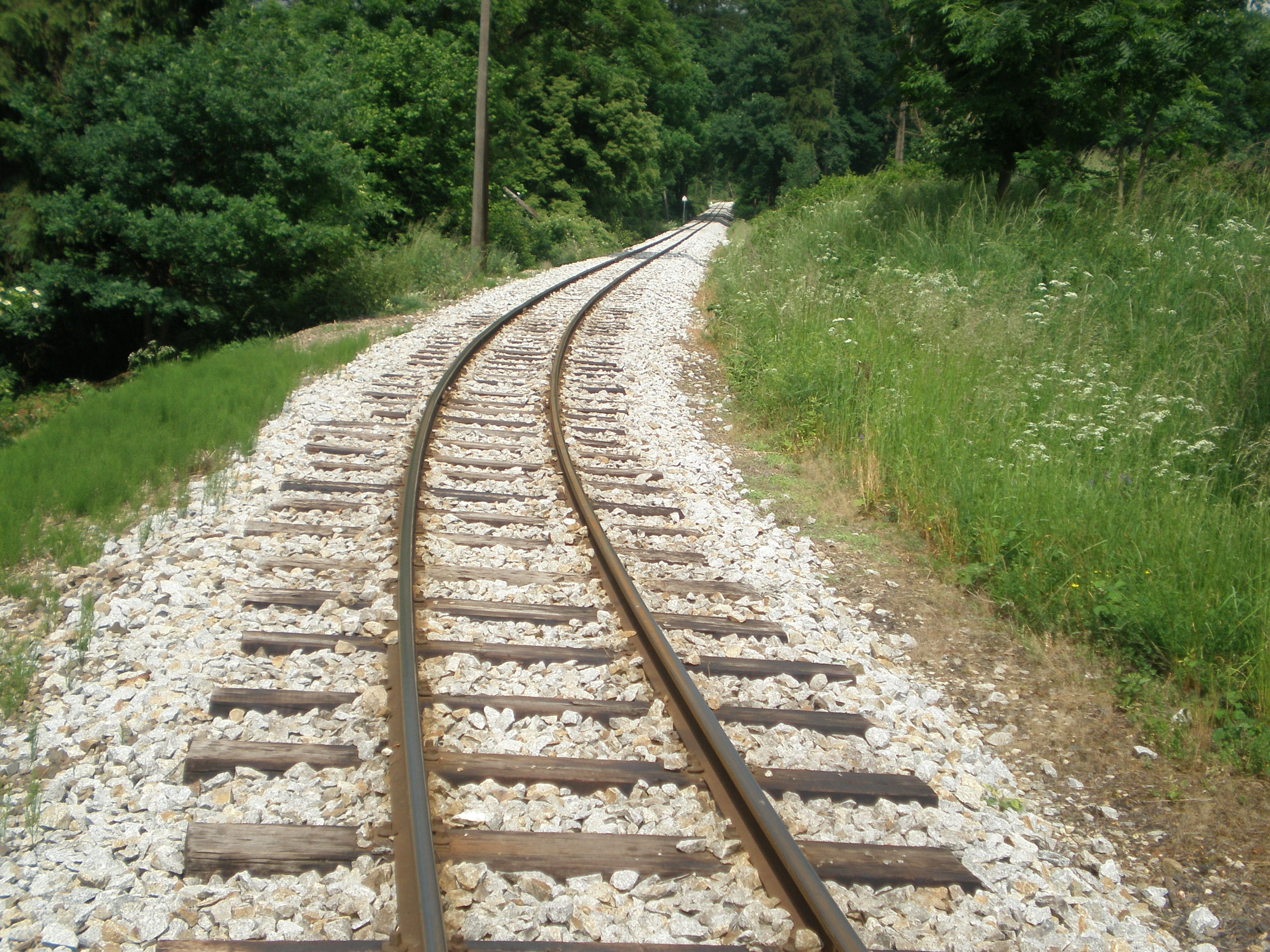

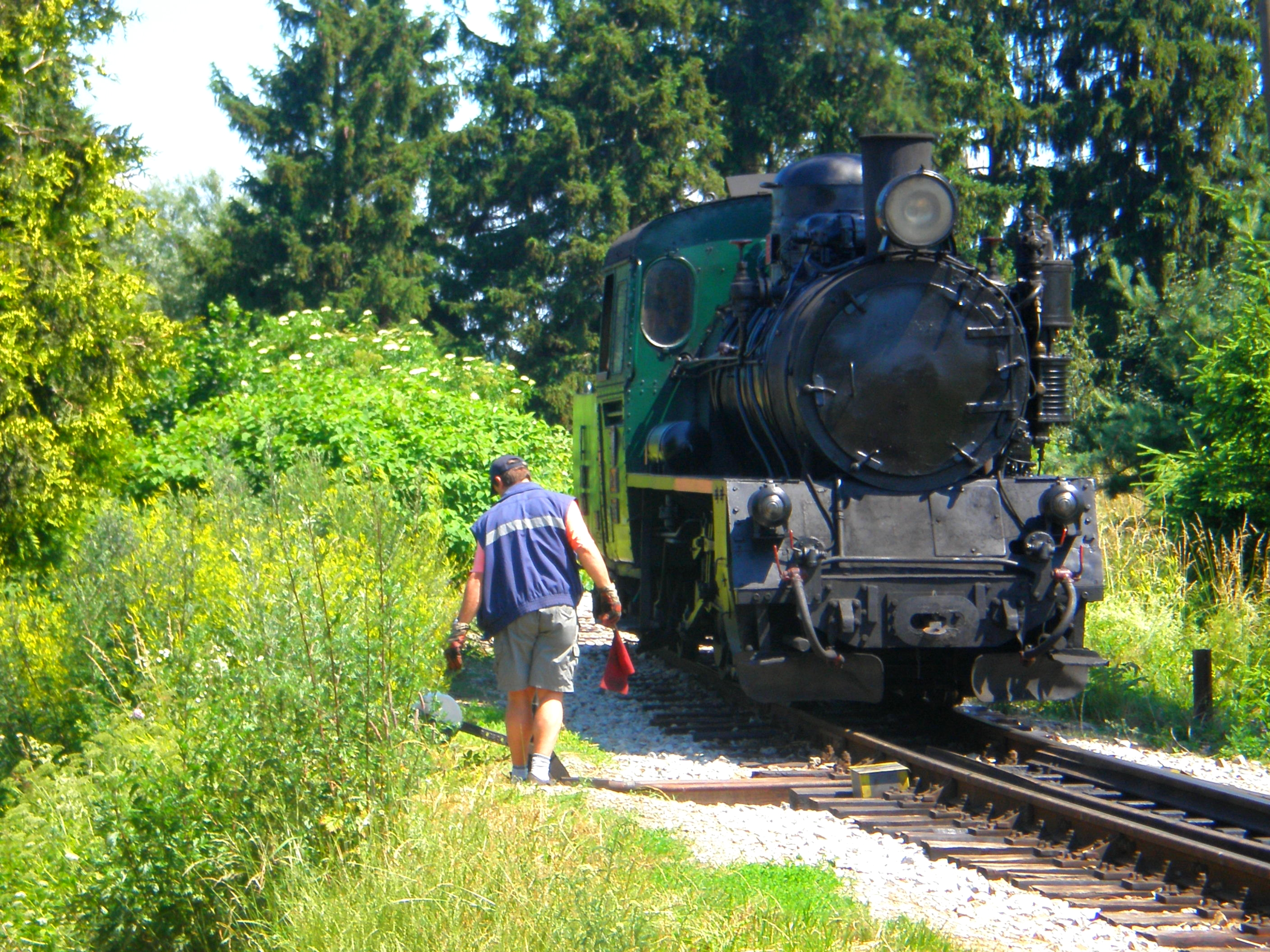
