= Expedition Lambaréné =

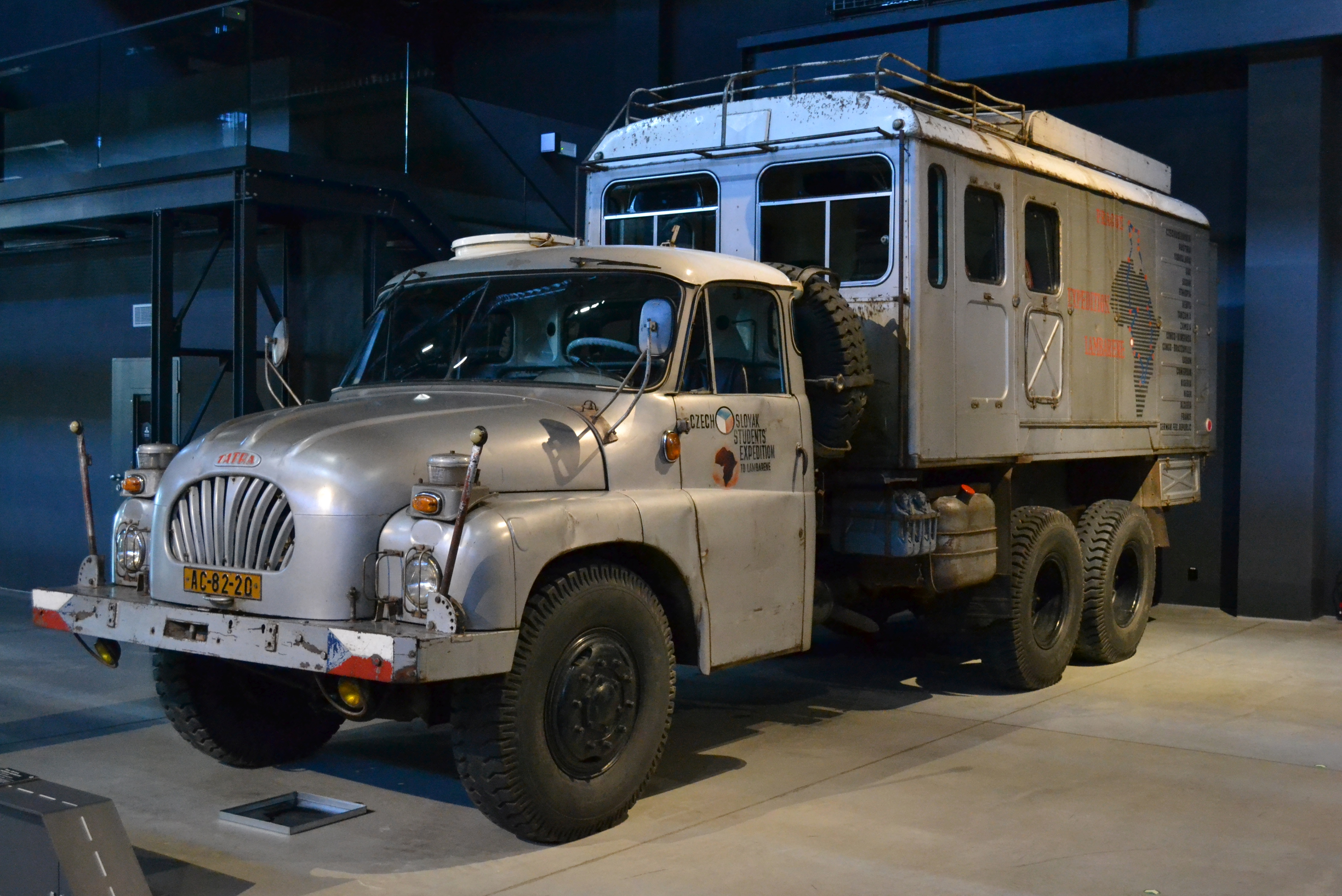
The expedition's Tatra in the Tatra Museum

Expedition Lambaréné was a Czechoslovak student expedition to the hospital of Albert Schweitzer in Lambaréné. Its goal was to bring medicine there. The expedition started from the Old Town Square, Prague on January 1, 1968, at 10:23 am and returned to Prague in August 1968. It lasted 257 days and travelled more than 35,000 km in its Tatra 138 Vn 6×6.

== Members ==
- Petr Bartůněk: organizer, leader, and doctor
- Miloslav Topinka: psychologist
- Josef Vavroušek: navigator and mechanic
- Luboš Kropáček: interpreter
- Jiří Plaček: chief driver and mechanic
- Klement Kunz: cook
- Jiří Stöhr: cameraman and photographer
- Petr Bárta: correspondent

== The Tatra model ==
A specially modified truck "Tatra 138 6×6 VN - Lambaréné" was made in a Tatra factory in Kopřivnice. Today it is there on display in its museum.

== The route ==
Prague – Rijeka – Cairo – Aswan – Khartoum – Addis Abeba – Nairobi – Kilima-Njaro – Dar es Salaam – Lusaka – Livingstone – Lusaka – Kinshasa – Brazzaville – Pointe-Noire – Libreville – Douala – Lagos – In-Salah – Algiers – Marseille – Paris – Munich – Prague

The government of Gabon did not allow the expedition to enter the country, and so they did not reach the hospital. The members met the hospital representatives in Libreville, however, during a stopover of the ship General Mangin in the local harbour.
