= Nová Včelnice =

- Town
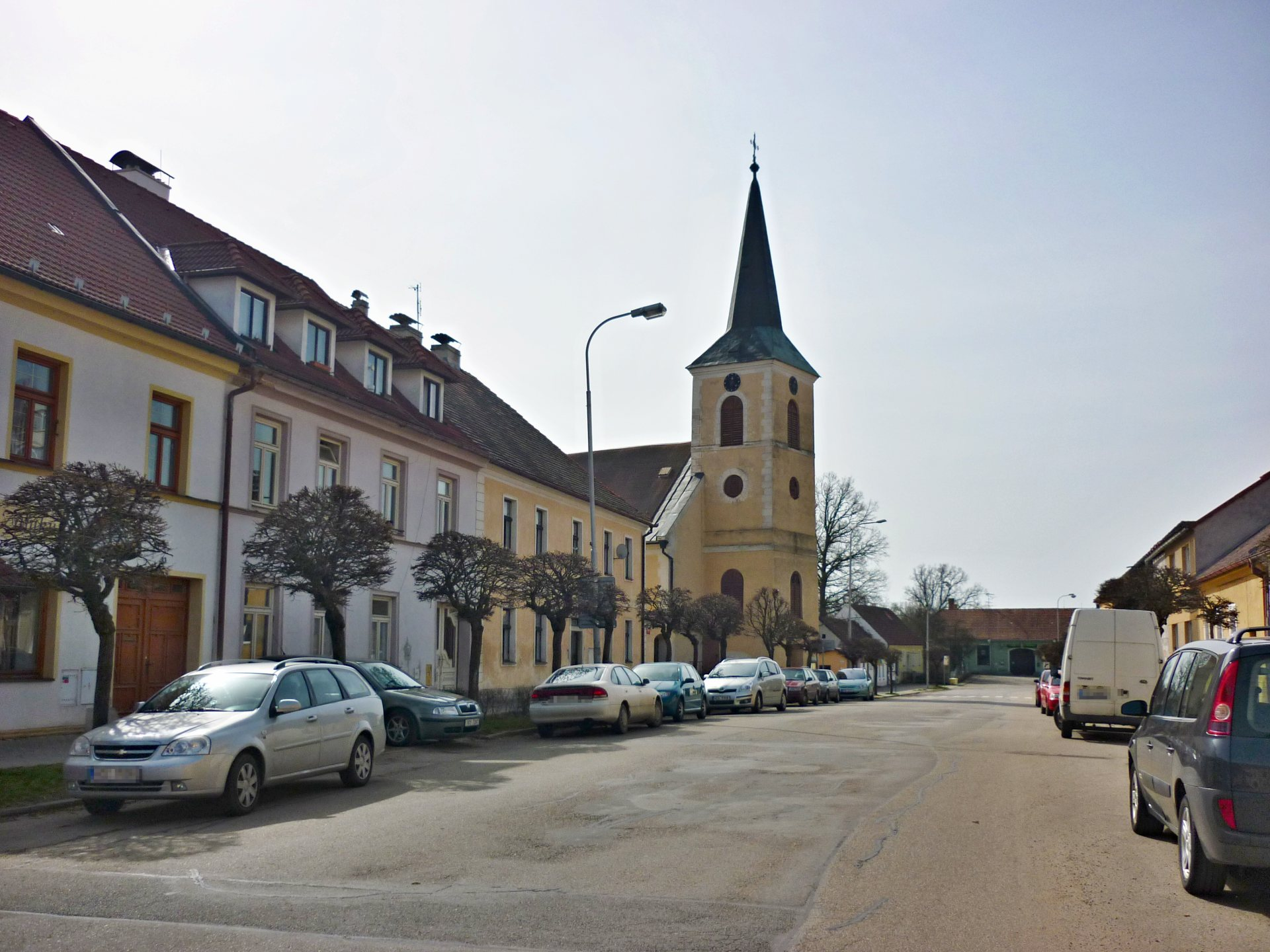
- The square Masarykovo náměstí

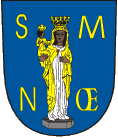
- Flag Coat of arms

- Location in the Czech Republic
- Coordinates: 49°14′22″N 15°4′21″E
- Country: Czech Republic
- Region: South Bohemian
- District: Jindřichův Hradec
- First mentioned: 1360

Government
  - Mayor: Tomáš Hrubec

Area
  - Total: 10.10 km^{2} (3.90 sq mi)
- Elevation: 507 m (1,663 ft)

Population (2026-01-01)
  - Total: 2,165
  - Density: 214.4/km^{2} (555.2/sq mi)
- Time zone: UTC+1 (CET)
  - Summer (DST): UTC+2 (CEST)
- Postal code: 378 42
- Website: www.vcelnice.cz

Nová Včelnice (Czech pronunciation: [ˈnovaː ˈftʃɛlɲɪtsɛ]; until 1950 Nový Etynk-Včelnice; German: Neuötting-Vtschelnitz) is a town in Jindřichův Hradec District in the South Bohemian Region of the Czech Republic. It has about 2,200 inhabitants. The town is located on the Kamenice River in the Křemešník Highlands.

== Etymology ==
Včelnice is an old name of the Nežárka River and the lower course of the Kamenice River, which is the main source of the Nežárka. The name of the river was transferred to the settlement. The name Nová Včelnice means 'new Včelnice'.

== Geography ==
Nová Včelnice is located about 11 kilometres (7 mi) northeast of Jindřichův Hradec and 51 km (32 mi) northeast of České Budějovice. It lies in the Křemešník Highlands. The highest point is at 538 m (1,765 ft) above sea level. The Kamenice River flows through the town. There are several fishponds in the municipal territory.

== History ==
The first written mention of Včelnice is from 1360. In 1649, the estate was bought by Spanish nobleman Bartholomew Paradys de la Saga. His wife Hypolity of Ladron had a chapel built nearby with a copy of a statuette of Black Madonna from Altötting. Her son had built 54 houses around the chapel and sold them to craftsmen. Thus, he turned a pilgrimage site into a large craft village named Neuötting/Nový Etynk.

In the 18th century, Nový Etynk grew and guilds were founded. In 1786, the chapel was rebuilt into the Church of the Assumption of the Virgin Mary. Nový Etynk-Včelnice was promoted to a market town in 1790 and to a town in 1884. In the 1930s, it lost the town title. In 1950, the market town was renamed to Nová Včelnice. The title of a town was returned to Nová Včelnice in 1998.

== Demographics ==
Historical population

Year	Pop.	±%
1869	1,901	—
1880	1,890	−0.6%
1890	1,824	−3.5%
1900	1,873	+2.7%
1910	1,996	+6.6%

Year	Pop.	±%
1921	1,910	−4.3%
1930	1,919	+0.5%
1950	1,840	−4.1%
1961	1,938	+5.3%
1970	2,006	+3.5%

Year	Pop.	±%
1980	2,882	+43.7%
1991	2,569	−10.9%
2001	2,476	−3.6%
2011	2,306	−6.9%
2021	2,168	−6.0%

Source: Censuses

== Transport ==
The I/34 road (part of the European route E551, the section from Jindřichův Hradec to Pelhřimov) runs next to the town.

Nová Včelnice is located on the Jindřichův Hradec narrow-gauge railway, leading from Jindřichův Hradec to Obrataň. It serves mostly as a tourist attraction.

== Sights ==
The Nová Včelnice Castle was originally a medieval fortress, first mentioned in 1454. It was rebuilt into a Renaissance castle at the end of the 16th century. In 1693–1709, it was extended and rebuilt in the Baroque style. Today it is privately owned and inaccessible.

A notable landmark of the town is the Church of the Assumption of the Virgin Mary, dating from 1786.

In Nová Včelnice is a Jewish cemetery, founded in 1800. It was used until World War II. It consists of about 120 preserved tombstones on an area of 865 m^{2} (9,310 sq ft).

== Notable people ==
- Rudolf Hrušínský (1920–1994), actor
- Luděk Munzar (1933–2019), actor
- Miloslav Topinka (born 1945), poet and essayist

== Twin towns – sister cities ==
Nová Včelnice is twinned with:

- Eggiwil, Switzerland
- Neuötting, Germany
