= Miloslav Topinka =

Czech poet

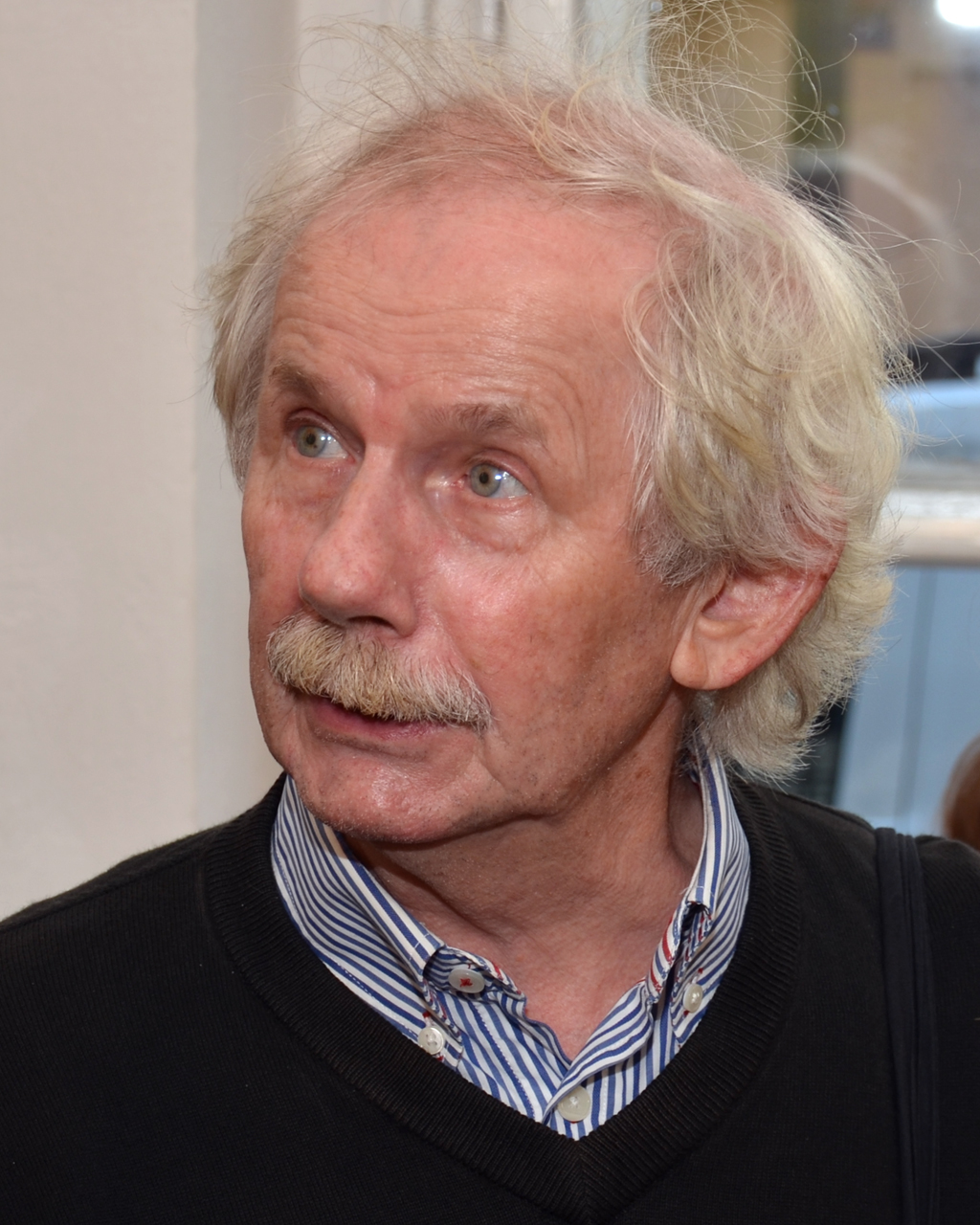
Miloslav Topinka (2018)

Miloslav Topinka (July 4, 1945, Nový Etynk near Jindřichův Hradec) is a Czech poet.

He graduated from psychology at the Charles University. In 1968 he took part in the student Expedition Lambaréné as the expedition's psychologist. In 1969 he became an editor of a monthly revue called Sešity. After it was banned, he worked as a psychologist and a clerk; he spent the years 1980–1987 in Casablanca. After his return to Czechoslovakia he worked among other professions as a translator and editor of authors such as Rimbaud, Gilbert-Lecomte, Věra Linhartová, Kolář, Petr Kabeš etc. Miloslav Topinka lived in Prague.

== Bibliography ==
Topinka's main themes are what he calls "the crack" - in other words, how to break from one's hidespot through to "4th dimension" - something that e. g. Marcel Duchamp or Paul Celan (Light-Compulsion, 1970) wrote about as well; and "silence" (one of his interviews is called "Anyone who ever thought about poetry, must ask oneself 'Why did Rimbaud stop writing?'"), embracing the idea that a poet's main goal is his/her existence itself. In his most celebrated book, The Crack, he uses many experimental techniques, such as transparent paper, holes in pages etc. to enable the reader to see differently. The book is about such people and events as Nerval, Rimbaud, Buhl; and Hiroshima.

Poetry

- Utopír (1969) - the name is a neologism which symbolises the four elements, Earth, Water, Air, and Fire
- Krysí hnízdo, (The Nest of Rats) 1970, destroyed by order of government before distribution, re-edited 1991, in Polish 1993
- Trhlina (The Crack) 2002, Jaroslav Seifert Prize

Biography

- Vedle mne jste všichni jenom básníci (Compared to me you're all just poets) 1995 – a biography of Arthur Rimbaud

Essays

- Hadí kámen (Snakestone), 2008 - collected essays and interviews, F. X. Šalda Prize 2008

Editor

- Vysoká hra (Le Grand Jeu at the French Wikipedia), 1993

For children

- Kniha o Zemi (Book about Earth), 1979
- Martin a hvězda (Martin and the star), 1981
- To neznáte zvířátka (Let the animals surprise you), 1981
