= Jindřichův Hradec narrow-gauge railway =

Jindřichův Hradec narrow gauge railway (Czech: Jindřichohradecké úzkokolejky) is a pair of narrow gauge railway lines in the Czech Republic, heading from Jindřichův Hradec to Nová Bystřice and Obrataň. Both lines are 760 mm (2 ft 5 15/16 in) gauge. It was built in 1897 in 1906 respectively. The lines were operated by the Jindřichohradecké místní dráhy company until 2022. After the company went bankrupt, the operation was restored by the Gepard Express company.

== History ==
The line to Nová Bystřice was opened on 1 November 1897 and the line to Obrataň followed on 24 December 1906. Both lines were originally operated with steam locomotives, with engine sheds in Jindřichův Hradec, Kamenice nad Lipou, Nova Bystřice und Obrataň. Soon after opening, a goods service with rollbocks was established.

Following the founding of Czechoslovakia, the railway became part of ČSD in 1924. During World War II, it came under the control of the Deutsche Reichsbahn.

In 1998, both lines were privatised and became owned and operated by Jindřichohradecké místní dráhy (JHMD).

In September 2022, after years of financial difficulties and mismanagement, the company filed for bankruptcy and operations ceased on 2 October 2022 with buses replacing the trains. In 2026, tourist-regime trains returned to both lines, under a new operator, Gepard Express.

== Route ==
Near Jindřichův Hradec, a section of dual gauge track exists on the 1,435 mm (4 ft 8 1/2 in) standard gauge České dráhy line between Veselí nad Lužnicí and Jihlava.

The maximum permitted speed is 50 km/h (31 mph) and the steepest gradient is 2.6% near Kamenice nad Lipou.

== Rolling stock ==
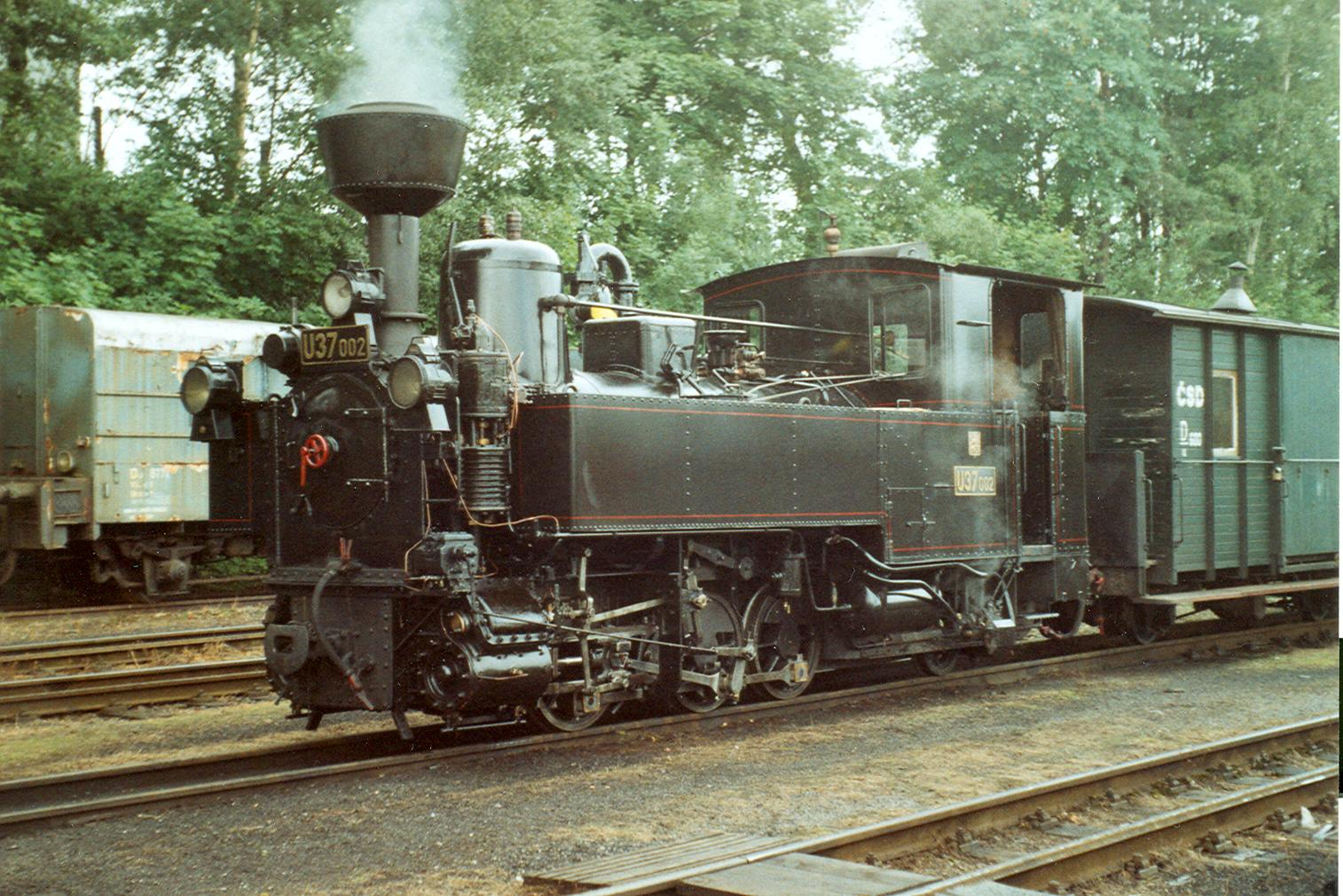
U 37 locomotive in Jindřichův Hradec

Most trains consist of a diesel locomotive and one carriage. During the summer steam trains with historic carriages are operated for tourists.

=== Locomotives ===
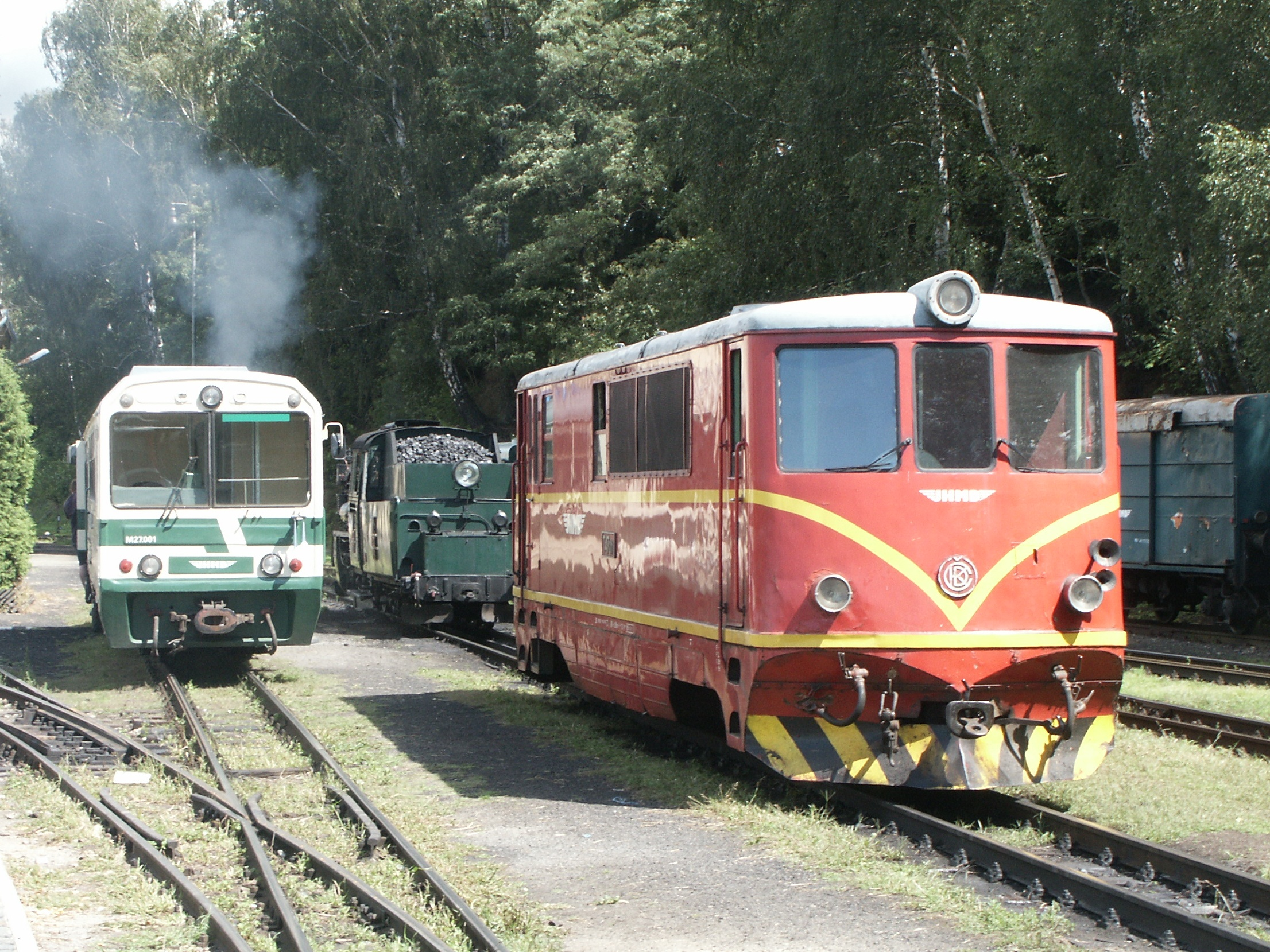
M 27 railcar and T 47 diesel locomotive

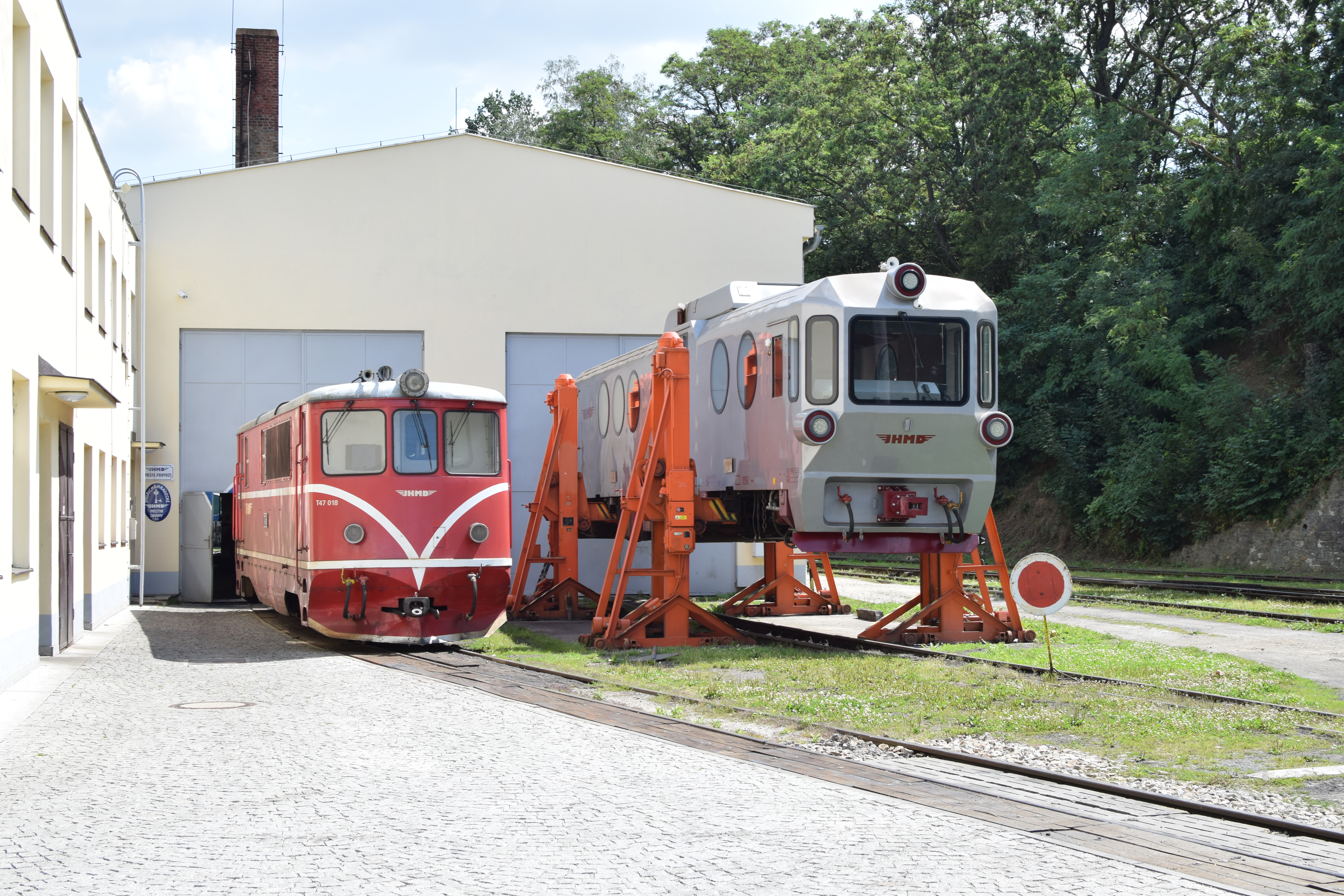
Maintenance base in Jindřichův Hradec

For the opening of the line to Nová Bystřice there were three 0-6-2 steam locomotives, like those used on the Murtalbahn. These were classified as class U (after Unzmarkt on the Murtalbahn) by the kkStB and were numbered U.1 – U.3. After the opening of the line to Obrataň in 1906 two more class U locomotives were acquired and numbered U.33 and U.34. In 1908 another locomotive, numbered U.41, was also acquired. After World War I only U.1, U.34 and U.41 remained in Jindřichův Hradec and in 1924 when ČSD took over the railway they were reclassified as U 37 and renumbered U 37.001, U 37.005 and U 37.006. ČSD bought three class U 47 Mallet locomotives and rented a further two identical locomotives for use on the lines.

A U 37 and a U 47 are used on the railway today for tourist trains. In addition to these a Romanian Reșița locomotive, numbered U 46.001 by JHMD, and a Polish Px48, now numbered U46.101, have been bought by JHMD for tourist trains.

Since 1955 traffic has mainly been handled by ČSD class T 47.0 diesel locomotives . In the 1970s more of these locomotives were transferred to Jindřichův Hradec when the Frýdlant–Heřmanice and Ružomberok–Korytnica narrow gauge railways were closed.

A PKP class Lxd2 locomotive, now numbered T 48.001, and a PKP class MBxd2, now numbered M 27.001, are also in use by JHMD.

=== Railcars ===
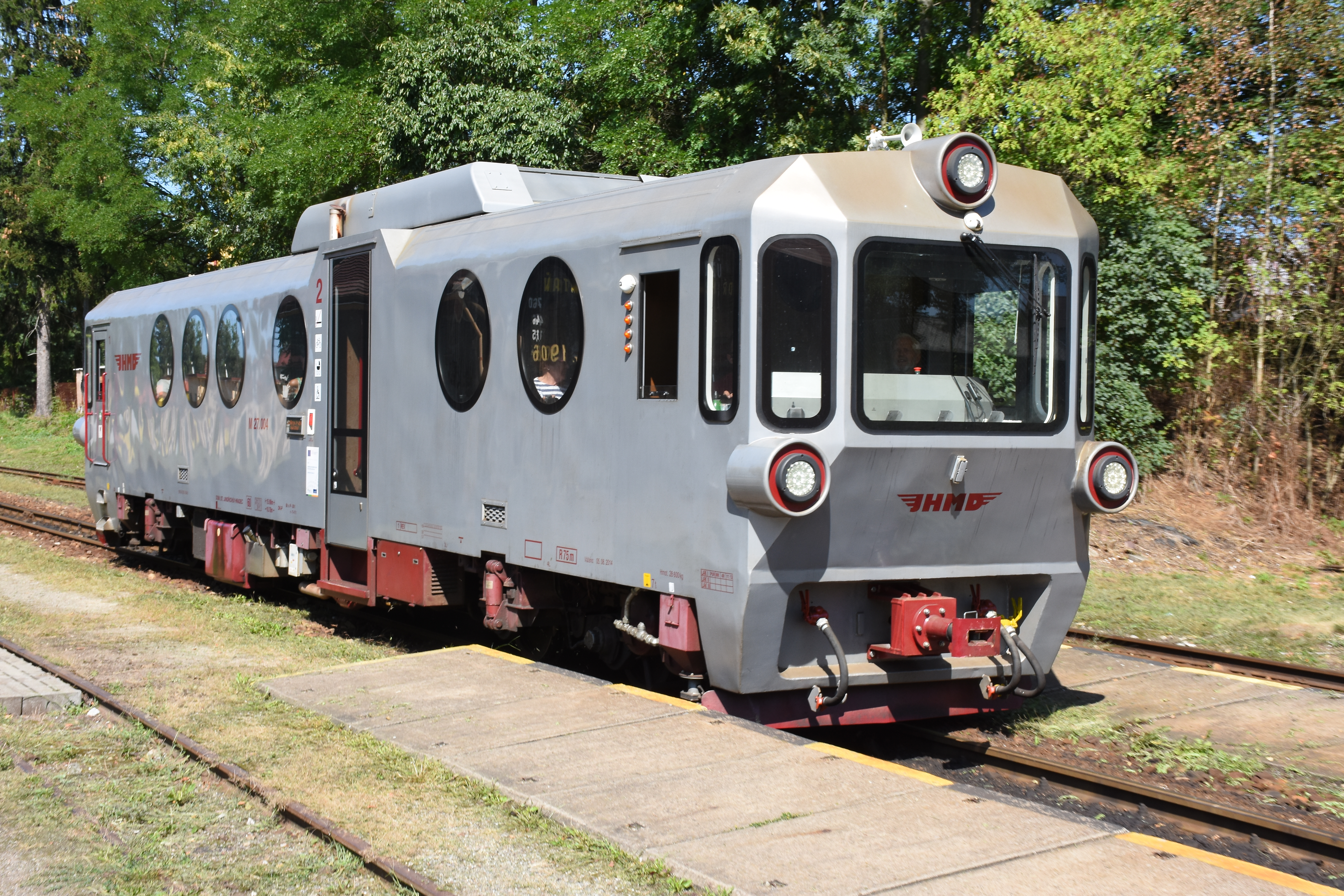
Class 805.9 Railcar

From 1929 two ČSD class M 11.0 railcars, which were narrow gauge versions ČSD Class M 120.4, were introduced. In 1939 two further railcars, this time ČSD class M 21.0 were acquired. Railcar services continued until shortly after World War II. Railcar M 21.004 is currently at Čierny Balog on the Čierny Hron Railway.

Four modernised 805.9 railcars have been obtained to run services.

=== Carriages ===
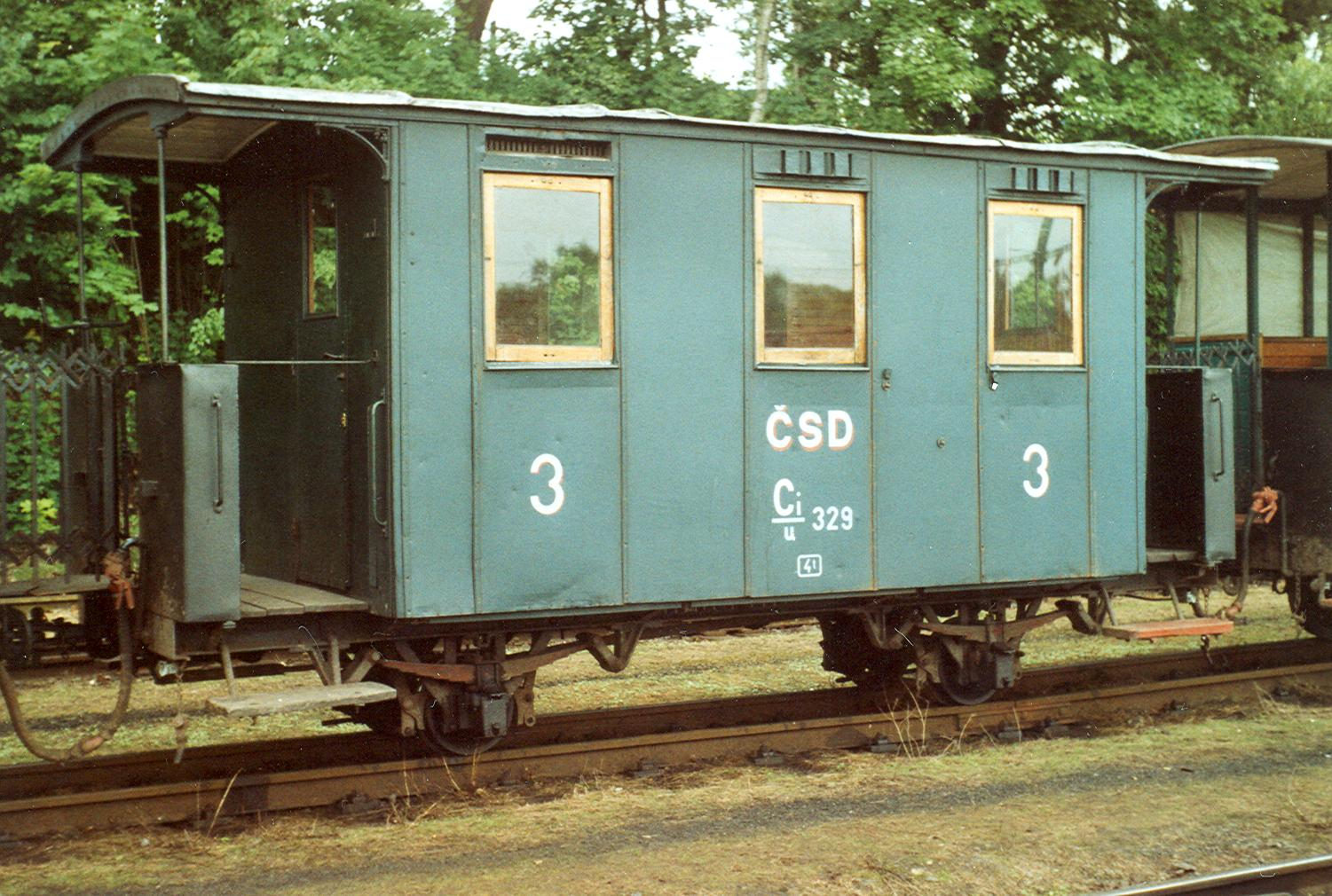
Two-axled carriage in the museum train

At first two-axled carriages manufactured by Ringhoffer in Prague were used. In the 1960s several four-axled carriages originally from Saxony were brought to Jindřichův Hradec from the Frýdlant–Heřmanice Railway, where they had been used since 1945. These carriages remained in use until the end of the 1970s.

The class Balm/u carriages in use today were manufactured by ČKD in the 1960s. When they were built these were modern carriages with wooden benches, oil heating, fluorescent lights and toilets.

In the 1980s the last remaining two-axled carriages were used to form a museum train, which is used in summer for the tourist steam trains.

=== Goods wagons ===
Goods traffic was originally carried in two-axled goods wagons, most of which were built by the Grazer Wagen- und Waggonfabrik AG (Graz Wagon Factory). Rollbocks were introduced in 1906 and are still used today. The newest rollbocks were built by Poprad Wagon Factory in the 1980s.

== See also ==
- Narrow gauge railways in the Czech Republic
