= Obrataň =

- Municipality
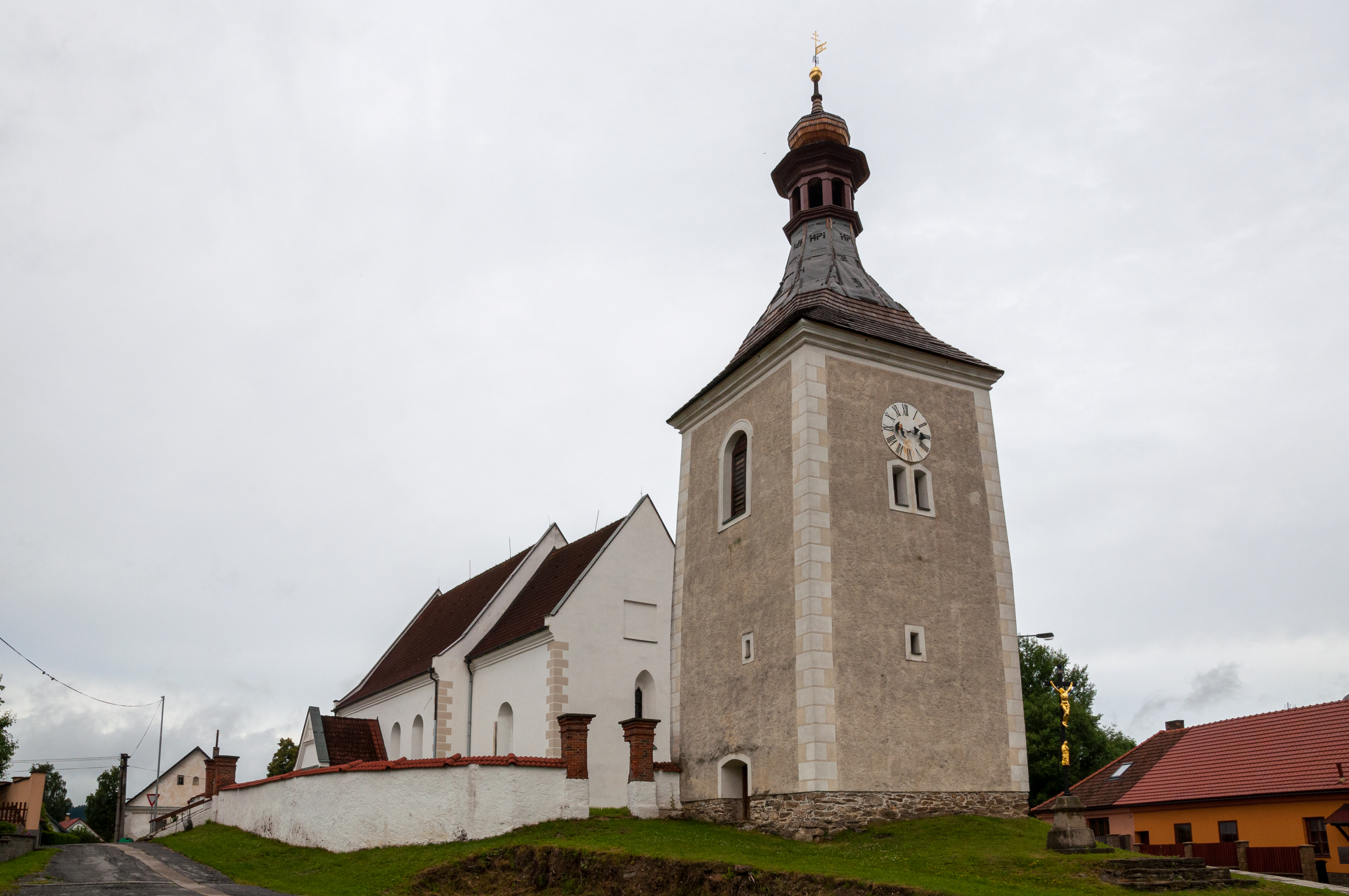
- Church of Saints Peter and Paul

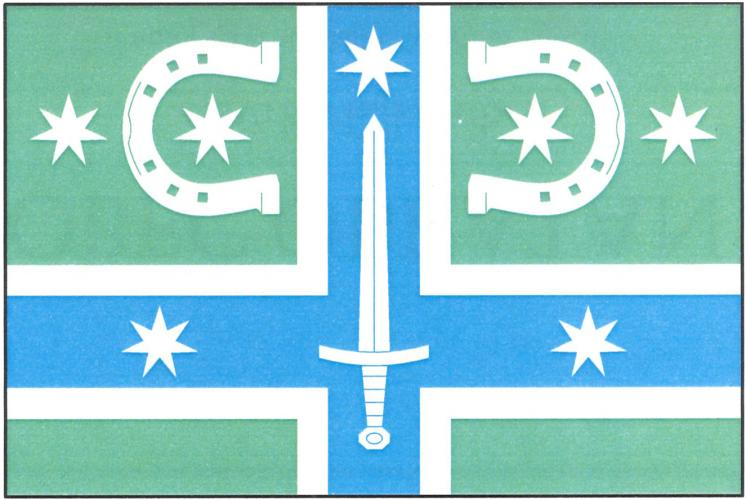
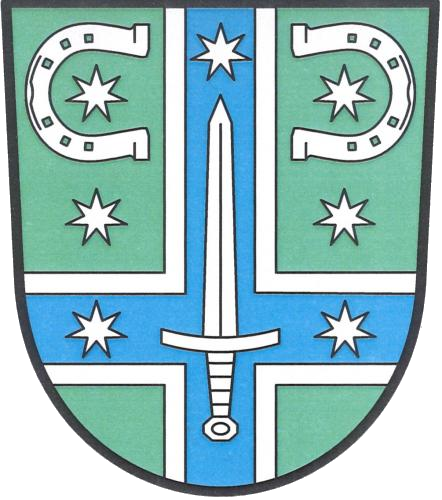
- Flag Coat of arms

- Location in the Czech Republic
- Coordinates: 49°25′30″N 14°56′37″E
- Country: Czech Republic
- Region: Vysočina
- District: Pelhřimov
- First mentioned: 1365

Area
  - Total: 32.08 km^{2} (12.39 sq mi)
- Elevation: 574 m (1,883 ft)

Population (2026-01-01)
  - Total: 783
  - Density: 24.4/km^{2} (63.2/sq mi)
- Time zone: UTC+1 (CET)
  - Summer (DST): UTC+2 (CEST)
- Postal codes: 394 12, 395 01
- Website: www.obecobratan.cz

Obrataň is a municipality and village in Pelhřimov District in the Vysočina Region of the Czech Republic. It has about 800 inhabitants.

== Administrative division ==
Obrataň consists of eight municipal parts (in brackets population according to the 2021 census):

- Obrataň (546)
- Bezděčín (8)
- Hrobská Zahrádka (67)
- Moudrov (4)
- Šimpach (35)
- Sudkův Důl (32)
- Údolí (2)
- Vintířov (60)

== Etymology ==
The name Obrataň is probably derived from the personal name Obratan, meaning "Obratan's (court)". There is also a theory that the name comes from the word obracet ('to turn') and that merchants' wagons used to turn around in the village. The municipality was called Obratany from 1854 to 1903, and then Vobrataň from 1904 to 1923. In 1924, it returned to its original name Obrataň.

== Geography ==
Obrataň is located about 20 kilometres (12 mi) west of Pelhřimov and 46 km (29 mi) west of Jihlava. It lies in the Křemešník Highlands. The highest point is the hill Svidník at 739 m (2,425 ft) above sea level. The stream Kejtovský potok originates here and then flows through the village of Obrataň. The stream and one of its tributaries supply a system of several fishponds in the eastern part of the municipal territory.

== History ==
The first written mention of Obrataň is from 1365.

== Demographics ==
Historical population

Year	Pop.	±%
1869	1,514	—
1880	1,614	+6.6%
1890	1,576	−2.4%
1900	1,568	−0.5%
1910	1,676	+6.9%

Year	Pop.	±%
1921	1,698	+1.3%
1930	1,603	−5.6%
1950	1,230	−23.3%
1961	1,155	−6.1%
1970	1,022	−11.5%

Year	Pop.	±%
1980	949	−7.1%
1991	899	−5.3%
2001	844	−6.1%
2011	781	−7.5%
2021	754	−3.5%

Source: Censuses

== Transport ==
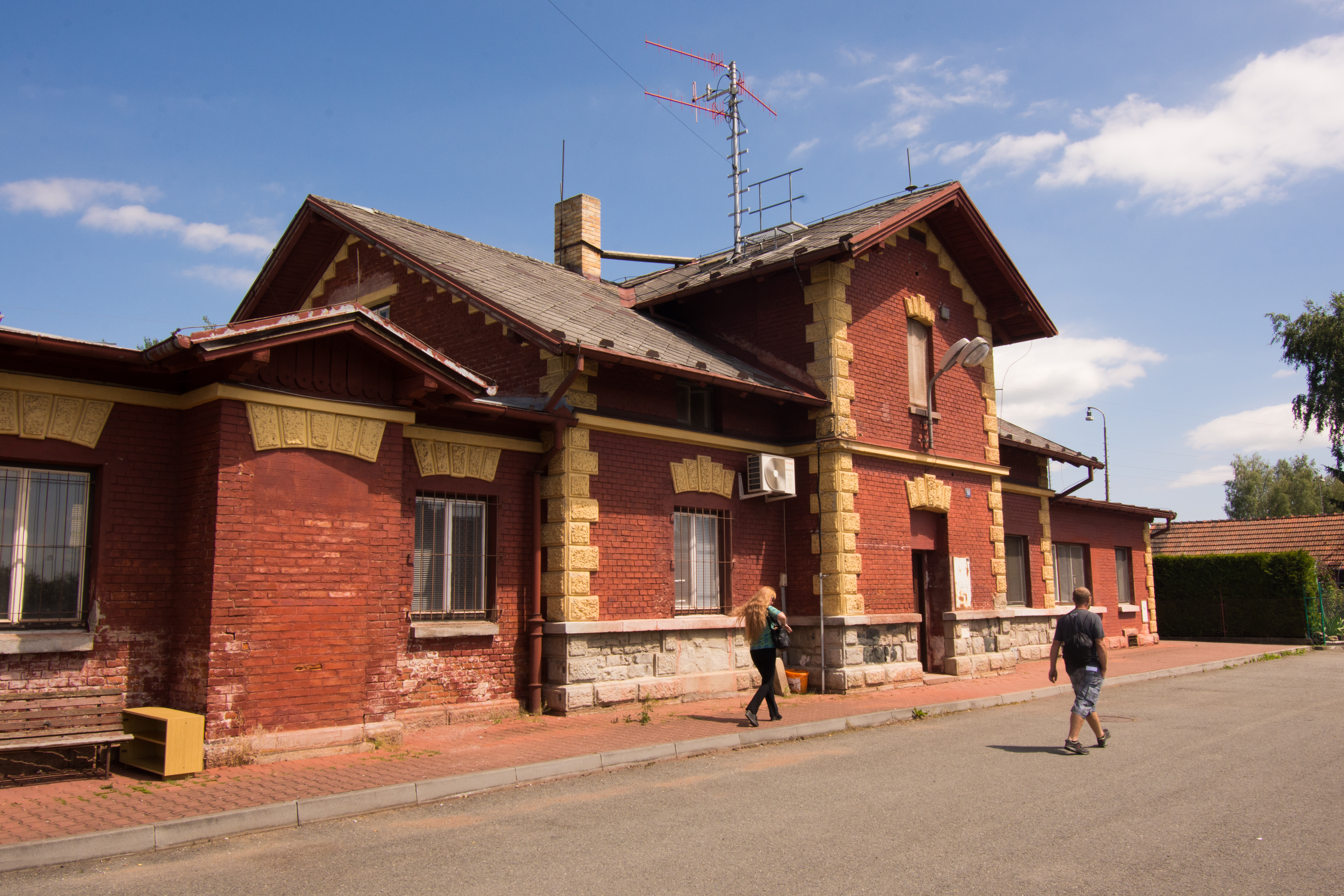
Train station

The I/19 road (the section from Tábor to Pelhřimov) runs through the municipality.

Obrataň is located on the railway line Jihlava–Tábor. In addition, Obrataň is the starting point and terminus of one of the two Jindřichův Hradec narrow-gauge railways, leading from Jindřichův Hradec. It serves mostly as a tourist attraction.

== Sights ==
The main landmark of Obrataň is the Church of Saints Peter and Paul (formerly known as Church of the Nativity of the Virgin Mary). It was built in the early Gothic style at the end of the 13th century. In the 14th, 15th and 16th centuries, the church was gradually extended. Baroque modifications were made in 1736. Next to the church is a separate bell tower, built in the late Gothic style and also modified in 1736.
