= Frýdlant–Heřmanice Railway =

Coordinates: 50.894°N 15.013°E

Overview
- Locale: Liberec Region
- Termini: Frýdlant, Czech Republic; Zittau, Germany

Service
- System: removed

History
- Work began: 1899
- Opened: August 1900
- Closed: January 1976

Technical
- Line length: 10.781 km (6.699 mi)
- Track gauge: 750 mm (2 ft 5 1/2 in)
- Minimum radius: 50 m (160 ft)
- Operating speed: 40 km/h (25 mph)

In 1864, a committee for construction of a standard gauge railway line connecting Zittau–Reichenau (Bogatynia)–Frýdlant–Liegnitz (Legnica) was established. Negotiations with governments and investors failed.

In 1884, a narrow gauge railway connecting Zittau with Markersdorf via Reichenau was built. As a result, new plans for construction of a 750 mm (2 ft 5 1/2 in) gauge line connecting Frýdlant and Zittau were drawn up. In 1899, a concession for construction along a Frýdlant–Dětřichov–Heřmanice route was granted. Public transport, operated by Friedländer Bezirksbahn, started in August 1900.

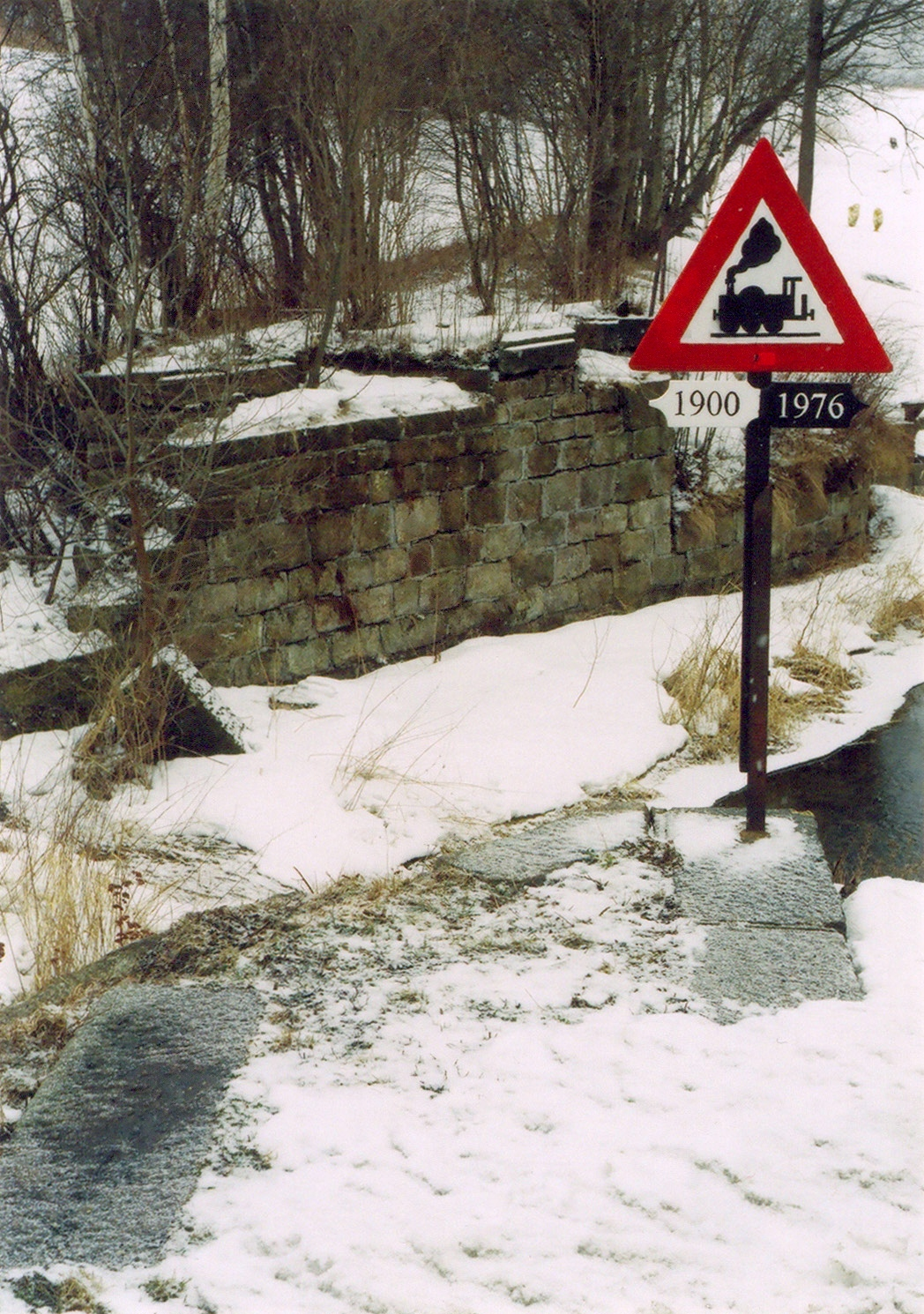
Commemorative sign on former bridge over the Oleška in Heřmanice

The line was closed in January 1976. The track was removed and some bridges were dismantled in 1996.

The total length of the railway was 10.781 kilometres (6.699 mi), the maximum grade was 35‰, minimum radius was 50 metres (160 ft), and the maximum speed was 40 kilometres per hour (25 mph).

4 years later, The group opened a museum dedicated to this former line. On the other hand, this would later planned to turn into a bike path.
