= Hrachoviste =

Hrachoviste may refer to:

- Hrachoviště, a municipality and village in the Czech Republic
- Hrachovište, a village and municipality in Slovakia
