= Třebětice =

Třebětice may refer to places in the Czech Republic:

- Třebětice (Jindřichův Hradec District), a municipality and village in the South Bohemian Region
- Třebětice (Kroměříž District), a municipality and village in the Zlín Region
