= Hrachoviště =

- Municipality
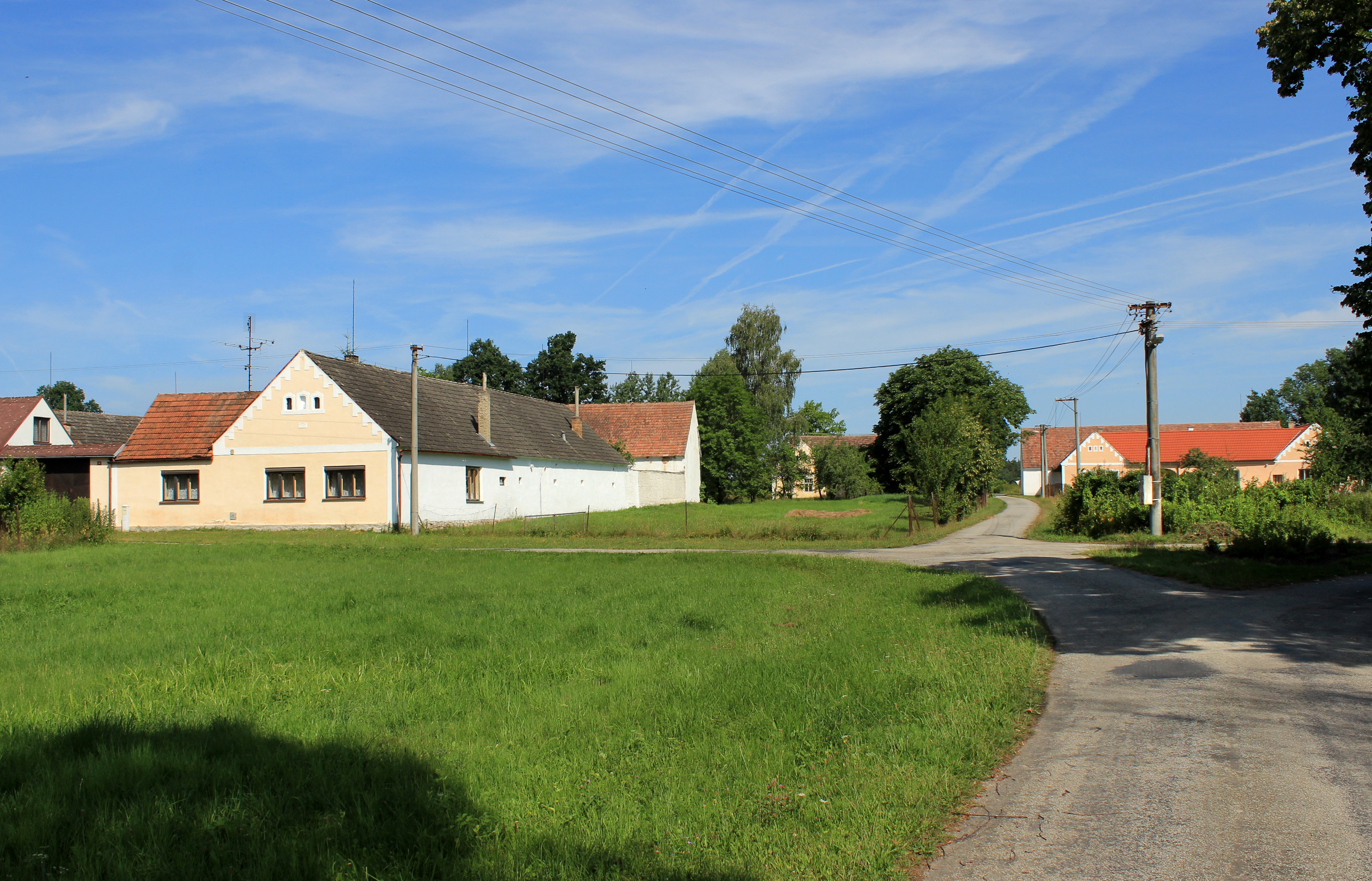
- Centre of Hrachoviště

- Location in the Czech Republic
- Coordinates: 48°55′46″N 14°46′16″E
- Country: Czech Republic
- Region: South Bohemian
- District: Jindřichův Hradec
- First mentioned: 1366

Area
  - Total: 4.90 km^{2} (1.89 sq mi)
- Elevation: 458 m (1,503 ft)

Population (2026-01-01)
  - Total: 84
  - Density: 17/km^{2} (44/sq mi)
- Time zone: UTC+1 (CET)
  - Summer (DST): UTC+2 (CEST)
- Postal code: 379 01
- Website: www.hrachoviste.cz

Hrachoviště is a municipality and village in Jindřichův Hradec District in the South Bohemian Region of the Czech Republic. It has about 80 inhabitants.

Hrachoviště lies approximately 30 kilometres (19 mi) south-west of Jindřichův Hradec, 22 km (14 mi) east of České Budějovice, and 132 km (82 mi) south of Prague.

== Demographics ==
Historical population
Year	Pop.	±%
1869	290	—
1880	267	−7.9%
1890	294	+10.1%
1900	310	+5.4%
1910	303	−2.3%
1921	283	−6.6%
1930	258	−8.8%
1950	184	−28.7%
1961	174	−5.4%
1970	143	−17.8%
1980	122	−14.7%
1991	92	−24.6%
2001	78	−15.2%
2011	87	+11.5%
2021	75	−13.8%
Source: Censuses
