= Třebětice (Jindřichův Hradec District) =

- Municipality
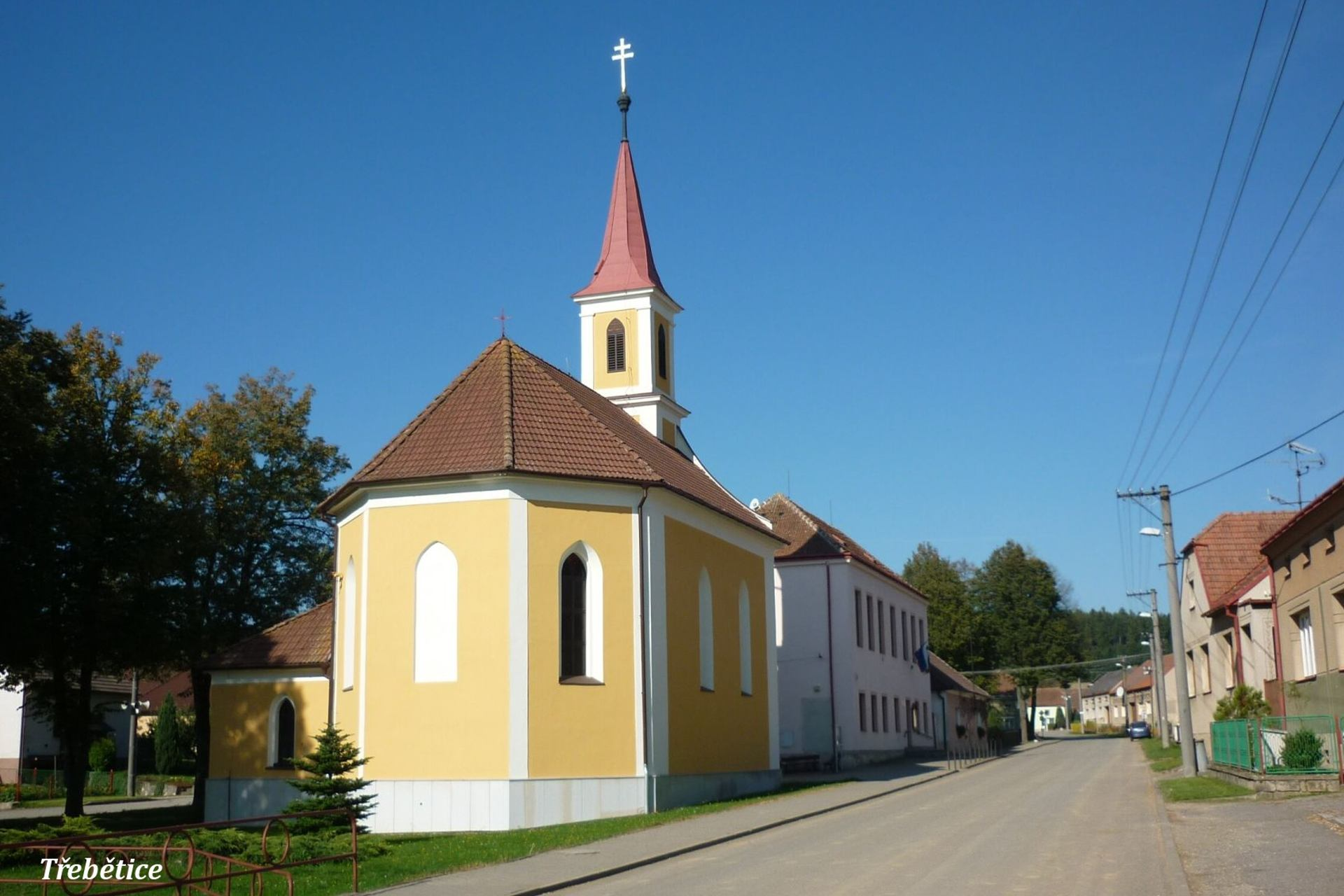
- Church of Saint Wenceslaus

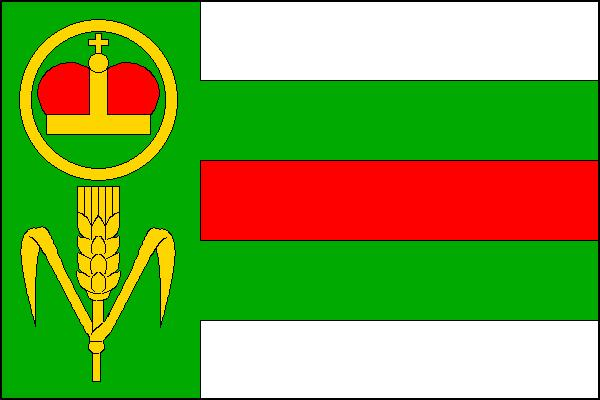
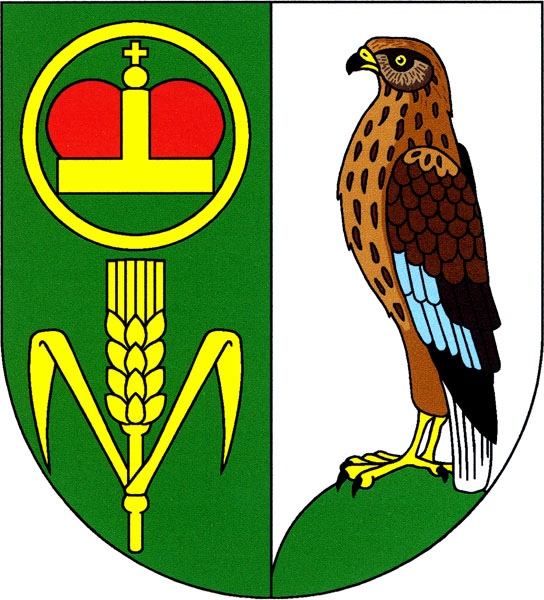
- Flag Coat of arms

- Location in the Czech Republic
- Coordinates: 49°2′52″N 15°31′15″E
- Country: Czech Republic
- Region: South Bohemian
- District: Jindřichův Hradec
- First mentioned: 1356

Area
  - Total: 6.95 km^{2} (2.68 sq mi)
- Elevation: 487 m (1,598 ft)

Population (2026-01-01)
  - Total: 335
  - Density: 48.2/km^{2} (125/sq mi)
- Time zone: UTC+1 (CET)
  - Summer (DST): UTC+2 (CEST)
- Postal code: 380 01
- Website: www.obectrebetice.cz

Třebětice is a municipality and village in Jindřichův Hradec District in the South Bohemian Region of the Czech Republic. It has about 300 inhabitants.

Třebětice lies approximately 40 kilometres (25 mi) east of Jindřichův Hradec, 77 km (48 mi) east of České Budějovice, and 141 km (88 mi) south-east of Prague.

== Demographics ==
Historical population
| Year | Pop. | ±% |
|---|---|---|
| 1869 | 306 | — |
| 1880 | 324 | +5.9% |
| 1890 | 334 | +3.1% |
| 1900 | 344 | +3.0% |
| 1910 | 305 | −11.3% |
| 1921 | 314 | +3.0% |
| 1930 | 328 | +4.5% |
| 1950 | 322 | −1.8% |
| 1961 | 375 | +16.5% |
| 1970 | 343 | −8.5% |
| 1980 | 317 | −7.6% |
| 1991 | 301 | −5.0% |
| 2001 | 297 | −1.3% |
| 2011 | 291 | −2.0% |
| 2021 | 319 | +9.6% |
Source: Censuses
