= Courtesan (disambiguation) =

Courtesan is a female courtier.

Courtesan may also refer to:

== Role ==
- A prostitute, catering to clients of wealth and status

== Arts, entertainment, and media ==
- Courtesan (film), a 1948 Mexican drama film
- The Courtesan is a 1896 genre painting by the French artist Nasreddine Dinet.
- The Courtesans, a UK doom rock band.

== Biology ==
- Euripus (genus), a genus of brush-footed butterflies commonly known as the courtesans
- Euripus nyctelius, a species in the genus Euripus commonly known as the courtesan
