= Allram =

Allram is a surname. Notable people with the surname include:

- Elisabeth Adele Allram-Lechner (1824–1861), Bohemian stage actress
- Josef Allram (1860–1941), Austrian writer and teacher

== See also ==
- Allam
