= Omar Sharaf =

Egyptian diplomat

Omar Sharaf ORE

Assistant Secretary-General of the Arab League
- In office September 1984 – October 1985

Ambassador to the People's Republic of China
- In office December 1982 – August 1985

Ambassador to Sweden
- In office December 1979 – August 1982

Deputy Representative UNHCR for Africa
- In office December 1961 – June 1966

Personal details
- Born: 22 October 1925 Aswan, Kingdom of Egypt
- Died: 8 September 1995 (aged 69) Heliopolis, Cairo, Egypt
- Spouse: Wadoud Wagdy Elwi
- Children: Three sons
- Education: Fouad 1st University, 1948 (Cairo University)

Omar Abdel Aziz Sharaf (22 October 1925 – 8 September 1993; Arabic: عمر شرف) was an Egyptian career diplomat, an Assistant Secretary General of the Arab League, a Deputy Representative of the UNHCR for the Middle East, as well as an Omani and international diplomat. He was a Commander Grand Cross of the Order of the Polar Star (Sweden 1982), a recipient of the Order of Merit, First Class (Egypt, August 1977), and a recipient of the Order of the Republic, Second Class (Egypt, February 1973). He was also a lawyer, a member of the Egyptian Bar association, who until his death in 1993, was Doyen of a family clan of diplomats, politicians, linguists and lawyers.

== Personal life ==
=== Early life ===
Sharaf was born in Aswan Governorate, southern Egypt on 22 October 1925, the eldest male and the second child of six siblings to a middle class Egyptian family. His father Dr. Mohammed Abdel Aziz Sharaf (Beni Suef Governorate 1889 – Cairo 1953) was a British-educated and trained medical doctor, who earned his PhD in general surgery from the University of Edinburgh, Scotland. Dr. Mohammed Abdel Aziz Sharaf had achieved some notability, having been mourned by Egypt's first post-23 July 1952 revolution president General Mohamed Naguib. At the time of his birth in the mid-Twenties, his father was inspector of health in Beni Suef governorate. His mother Raohia Zaki Saleh (1904–1981) was a maternal granddaughter of Hassouna El Nawawy, Grand Sheikh of Al-Azhar. She was educated, well versed, a popular socialite, and the daughter of a one-time governor; one source mentioned her father as governor of Suez Governorate. while another mentioned him as the governor of Beni Suef governorate. Moving around with his parents, Sharaf attended several primary and secondary schools in both upper and lower Egypt, the family finally settling in the Cairo suburb of Heliopolis.

=== Education ===
Sharaf completed his secondary school education graduating from El Mansoura secondary school, lower Egypt, in September 1942. He matriculated to the faculty of Law at Fu ād Ist University (Cairo University), where he graduated with a degree in 1947.

=== Family ===
His siblings included: Sameha Sharaf (1922–1996), a lecturer and translator at the Middle East News Agency (MENA); Ezz El-din Sharaf (1927–2010), former police officer and Assistant Minister for Foreign Affairs; Sami Sharaf (1929–), former army officer and government minister; Salwa Sharaf (1935–), socialite; Tarek Sharaf (1936–1996), former army officer and doyen of the Arabic language simultaneous translators at the United Nations. His family of diplomats included: his brother Ezz El-din, a former ambassador to Madagascar and Pakistan; his son Karim (1963–), deputy Assistant Minister, ambassador and former head of mission to Iraq, Afghanistan, and Bosnia Herzegovina; his nephew Abdul Rehim Shalaby, Assistant Minister for Foreign Affairs and former ambassador to Myanmar, Indonesia and Kuwait; his nephew Omar Shalaby, counselor, permanent delegation of Egypt to UNESCO; his brother-in-law Ali Wagdy Elwai (1943–2000), deputy Assistant Minister and former ambassador to the Central African Republic; his cousin Essam Eldin Hawas, former ambassador to the State of Qatar.

=== Marriage ===
While posted to the United Nations in New York City, Sharaf returned to Egypt in February 1959 to marry Noha Elwi (née Wadoud Wagdy Elwi); it was an arranged marriage, typical of the time. She was the second daughter of Wagdy Elwi, a bureaucrat at the Egyptian Ministry of Justice, and a great-grandson of Elwi Pasha, personal ophthalmologist to the Khedive of Egypt. Her mother Samia Rostom was the daughter of second-generation immigrants from Turkey, and the niece of the Egyptian silver screen star of the Forties and Fifties, Zaki Rostom. The marriage produced three children.

== Diplomatic career ==
Sharaf served with distinction at the Ministry for Foreign Affairs for nearly four decades, from the early Fifties to the mid-Eighties, witnessing much of Egypt's diplomatic, political and military turmoil. In 1948, he sat for and passed the Egyptian Diplomatic Corps examinations held at Alexandria, then summer seat of the Government of H.M. King Farouk. During his lengthy career, Sharaf assumed several positions of relative importance: he was Assistant Secretary-General of the Arab League (1985–1986); Ambassador of Egypt to the People's Republic of China (1982–1985), Ambassador of Egypt to the Kingdom of Sweden (1979–1982); Deputy Chief of Mission of the Sultanate of Oman to the Islamic Republic of Pakistan (1974–1977); Consul General of the United Arab Republic (UAR) at Hong Kong (1966–1971); Deputy Representative of the United Nations High Commissioner for Refugees for the Middle East (1962–1966).

Prior to that, he was First Secretary of the permanent Mission of the United Arab Republic to the United Nations at New York City (1957–1960), Second Secretary of the Embassy of Egypt at Ankara (1954–1956), Third secretary of the Embassy of Egypt at Bucharest (1953–1954), and Third Secretary of the Legation of the Kingdom of Egypt at Moscow (1951–1953). He was a proficient linguist, and considered one of the Egyptian foreign ministry's foremost experts on Asian affairs and a Sinologist. Sharaf was promoted to the rank of Ambassador in 1977. He was promoted again to the category of Ambassador Par Excellence in December 1983. During his career he was the recipient of the Order of the Republic, Second Class, Egypt, February 1973, the Order of Merit, First Class, Egypt, August 1977, and the Order of the Polar Star, Sweden, 21 October 1982. He retired from the Diplomatic Corps and active service in 1985.

=== The Arab League ===
In October 1985, Sharaf was appointed Assistant Secretary General of the Arab League. As a diplomat, his tenure as Assistant Secretary of the League was unfulfilling for several reasons, the most important of which was that his nomination to the position by the then deputy Prime Minister and Minister for Foreign Affairs, Dr. Ahmed Asmat Abdel-Meguid, came at the height of the Arab boycott of Egypt for having signed the Camp David Peace Accords with Israel in 1979. At the time, Sharaf was among a handful of Egyptian senior officials at the League's extensive headquarters in Cairo's Tahrir square, the League, and most of its specialized agencies having been moved out of Cairo to Tunis. The move was a consequence of the decisions and decrees taken at the second Baghdad summit of March 1979 that expelled Egypt from the Arab League, and boycotted and imposed sanctions on it over its peace accords with Israel. His few noted achievements at the League were administrative, succeeding with the assistance of his friend and colleague ambassador Dr. Osama El-Baz in securing from President Hosni Mubarak approval for the restructuring of pay scales for Egyptians working at the league, equating them to their Arab counterparts.

=== Ambassador to China ===
Sharaf was appointed to the People's Republic of China in 1982, becoming the seventh Egyptian diplomat to assume the post since the establishment of diplomatic relation between the two countries in 1956. He assumed his new position in September 1982, and presented his credentials in Beijing to the Deputy Chairman of the Standing Committee of the National People's Congress on 22 September 1982. He established a working relationship with Chinese Communist Party leaders, including paramount leader Deng Xiaoping, and Premier and General Secretary of the Communist Party Zhao Ziyang, which successfully resulted in several important bilateral visits including that by Zhao Ziyang to Cairo in December 1982. During this visit many international, regional and bilateral issues were discussed amongst them was the Middle East Peace Process. His rapport and contacts in both Cairo and Beijing enabled him to arrange for the first visit ever by an Egyptian president, Hosni Mubarak, to the People's Republic of China, in April 1983.

Sharaf was quoted in the press expounding the development of Egyptian–Chinese bilateral relations, emphasizing the importance of Mubarak's visit, the nature of the consultations the president would hold with his Chinese counterpart, and the various issues to be discussed. Sharaf also pointed out to the press China's keen and growing interest in peace and stability in the Middle East, the Far East and the globe. As this was the first visit of an Egyptian president to China, several treaties, protocols and memoranda of understanding (MOU) were signed between the two countries in various fields including agriculture, industry, technical and military cooperation. Also concluded was a MOU on the establishment of an Egyptian consulate in Shanghai, considered necessary for bolstering bilateral trade. Sharaf also assisted in securing an agreement from China, where the latter would finance and build the Friendship and Culture Palace, later renamed the Cairo International Convention & Exhibition Centre (CICC). President Mubarak had earlier approved a land site of 15 acres in the Cairo suburb of Nasr City for the project. The cost of the CICC was estimated to be about 200 million Swiss francs, and China agreed to present it as a gift to the people of Egypt. It was also during this presidential visit to Beijing that Mubarak held informal talks with the former U.S. Secretary of State Henry Kissinger, who was visiting China at the time.

Sharaf received an important visit by the Egyptian Deputy Prime Minister and Minister of Defense and Military Production Field Marshal Mohamed Abd al-Halim Abu Ghazala in September 1983. As a result of this visit, and in his capacity as ambassador to China, Sharaf was requested the following year to name and hoist the Egyptian flag on the 1586 Ton Chinese built Jianghu-1 class Type 053 frigate Najim al Zafir (951). This was an unusual request and a rare honor for an Egyptian Diplomat, let alone a civilian. The flag hoisting ceremony took place on 20 July 1984, at the Hudong Shipyard in Shanghai China, and after completing her shakedown cruise in Chinese waters, Al Zafir set sail for Egypt where she was commissioned and entered service with the Egyptian Navy in late October 1984. Sharaf also received in Beijing in 1984, his friend and mentor Dr. Boutros Boutros Ghali, later Secretary General of the United Nations, in the latter's capacity as Egypt's then Minister of State for Foreign Affairs. Sharaf would arrange for Ghali to discuss several issues of importance with his Chinese hosts including the Middle East peace process, Egypt's activities in the Non Aligned Movement, the ongoing Iran–Iraq War, as well as a number of bilateral issues.

=== Ambassador to Sweden ===
As director of the Asian department at the MFA, Sharaf expected an appointment to the available post of ambassador of Egypt to the People's Republic of China, and was surprised, as were others, when he was appointed as ambassador to the Kingdom of Sweden in 1979. This decision had been made without prior consultation, which was not the norm for senior diplomats, by Egypt's then Prime Minister and acting Foreign Minister Mustafa Khalil. Sharaf presented his credentials to H.M. King Carl XVI Gustav of Sweden on 13 December 1979. Sharaf's primary mission in Sweden was the promotion of bilateral technical and economic ties, especially trade. To this end, he received then Minister of Electricity and Energy, engineer Maher Abaza. He also received Egypt's then-deputy Prime Minister and Minister for Foreign Affairs (later Prime Minister) Kamal Hassan Ali, in Stockholm. During this visit, Ali presented H.M. King Carl XVI Gustav with a formal invitation from President Anwar Sadat to visit Egypt.

As Egyptian ambassador to Sweden, Sharaf and his wife Noha were active on the diplomatic and social circuit. Noha was successful in establishing a local chapter for the principle Egyptian charity Al Wafa' Wa Amal in Stockholm. The charity, founded and presided at the time by Mrs.Jehan Sadat, wife of president Sadat, specialized in caring for the poor, the mentally and physically challenged, and the disabled. Mrs. Sadat was keen to learn from ambassador Sharaf and his wife about Sweden's experience and expertise in caring for paraplegics and the disabled. Besides their regular diplomatic activities, the couple hosted and organized bazaars, fundraisers, cultural and musical galas for the benefit of the Egyptian charity. Through her work on behalf of Al Wafa' Wa Amal in Stockholm, Noha. With the assistance of her husband, was able to collect gifts and donations in the form of hospital equipment for the benefit of the charity. On one occasion, she was reported in the Egyptian press to have succeeded in collecting 100 hospital beds and 45 wheelchairs.

==== Naguib Mahfouz and the Nobel Prize in Literature ====
Sharaf played a minor but important part in the drama that unfolded in Cairo surrounding the initial consideration of the Royal Swedish Academy of Sciences of Naguib Mahfouz for the Nobel Prize in Literature in 1982. Sharaf was quietly and unofficially approached in 1981 by Dr. Attia Amer, Professor of Arabic Literature at Stockholm University, with a request to forward translations of Mahfouz's work for further study and evaluation by the Swedish Academy. Sharaf acted on the request, only to be rebuffed by Cairo and presented with an alternative candidate, which the academy politely declined as all nominations were its sole prerogative and mandate and did not yield to government pressure. Sharaf would express disappointment at Cairo's incomprehensible stance on the issue, believing it would have made an enormous difference to the cause of Arabic literature, to Egypt, to him as ambassador, and naturally to Mahfouz, had the latter been nominated and won the prize, joining the list of Nobel Laureates for that year.

==== Recipient of the Order of the Polar Star ====
Upon the termination of his mission to Sweden in 1982, H.M. King Carl XVI Gustaf of Sweden, bestowed upon Sharaf the Order of the Polar Star, with the rank of Commander Grand Cross, for services rendered to Swedish—Egyptian relations. Sharaf requested and received from the president of Egypt, as per Egyptian protocol, official approbation to accept the Swedish honor.

=== Islamic Republic of Pakistan ===
The assumption of H.M. Sultan Qaboos bin Said Al Said to the throne of the Sultanate of Oman ushered in a new era of development and modernization. In this context, Sharaf, at the request of the Sultanate, and along with a small hand-picked group of Egyptian diplomats, went on secondment to Oman in 1974 to help establish the Omani Diplomatic Corps, as well as staff some of its embassies overseas. Sharaf was appointed in 1974 as an Omani diplomat with the rank of Minister Plenipotentiary and posted as Deputy Chief of Mission of the newly established embassy of Oman to the Islamic Republic of Pakistan. Sharaf would forge an excellent working relationship with his immediate superior, and Oman's first ever ambassador to Pakistan, HRH Prince Shabib bin Taimur Al Said, as well as with Pakistani officials during the presidency of Fazal Ilahi Chaudhry and the premiership of Zulfikar Ali Bhutto.

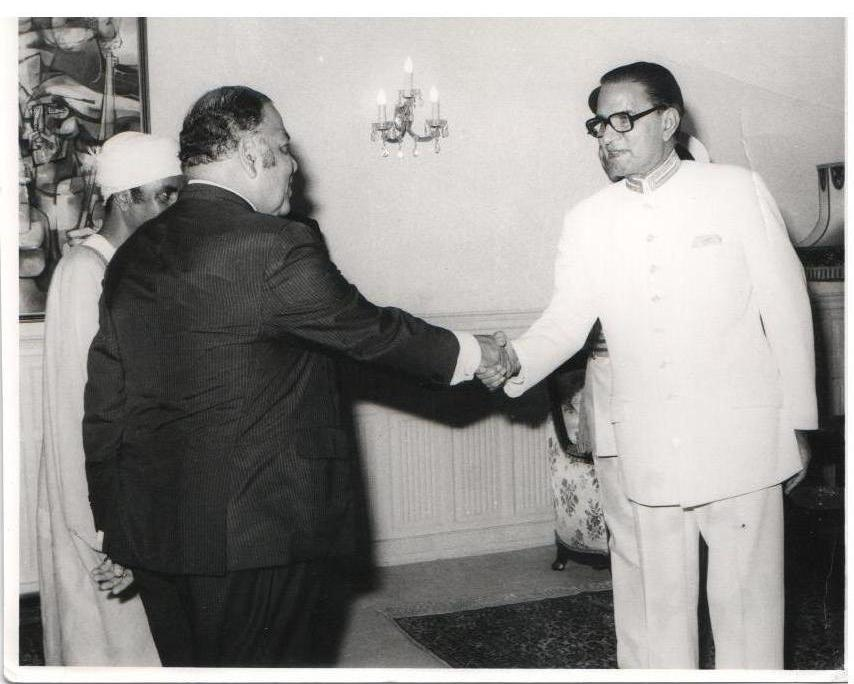
President of Pakistan Fazal Ilahi Chaudhry receiving Mr. Omar Sharaf at the Presidential Palace, Rawalpindi, 1975.

It was during his posting to Islamabad that Sharaf met and became a close friend of then Colonel and later Field Marshal Mohamed Hussein Tantawi, it helped that both men were born in the same upper Egyptian town of Aswan. At the time, Tantawi was serving as Egypt's Military Attaché in Islamabad. Sharaf would serve in Islamabad till 1977. His younger brother Ezz El-din would also serve in Islamabad, in the early eighties, as Egypt's ambassador to Pakistan.

=== Hong Kong ===
In 1966 Sharaf was designated and appointed as Consul General of the United Arab Republic to Hong Kong, after having been nominated by President Gamal Abdul Nasser with the approval of Queen Elizabeth II—at the time Hong Kong was a British colony. In Hong Kong, he assisted in the establishment of the offices and secured the general landing rights for Egypt's national carrier United Arab Airlines at Kai Tak International Airport. Regular flights to Hong Kong were added in March 1969, as a stopover destination to the scheduled flights of the airline on its Cairo to Tokyo route. Sharaf witnessed first-hand, and wrote extensively on the implementation of export-oriented policies, the colony's rise as a regional financial center, and the-then infant industry of container shipping, with emphasis on the industry's future on world trade and its implications and benefits for the Suez Canal. At the time, Hong Kong was of particular interest to any China watcher, as well as for following political and military developments in South-East Asia and the ongoing war in Vietnam. In 1967, the Vietnam war had claimed the life of the head of the Egyptian Mission at Hanoi, Gamal Eldin Omar Ibrahim (1916–1967). Sharaf and Ibrahim were colleagues and friends, and Sharaf was vocal about his friend's untimely death, as well as his opposition to the war in Vietnam. Gamal Eldin Omar, the Egyptian Charge d'affaires at Hanoi, was wounded seeking shelter from an American air strike on the city. He would die later of complications in a Hong Kong hospital on 6 December 1967.

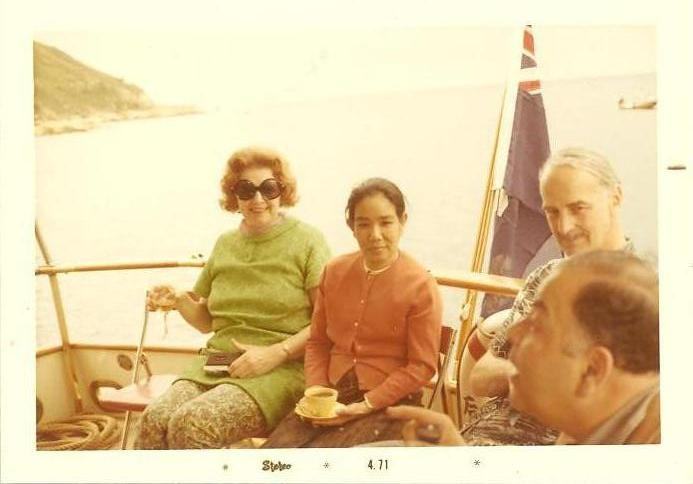
Omar Sharaf with Ray and Peggy Lewthwaite, Hong Kong Harbor, April 1971. Photo by Noha Sharaf

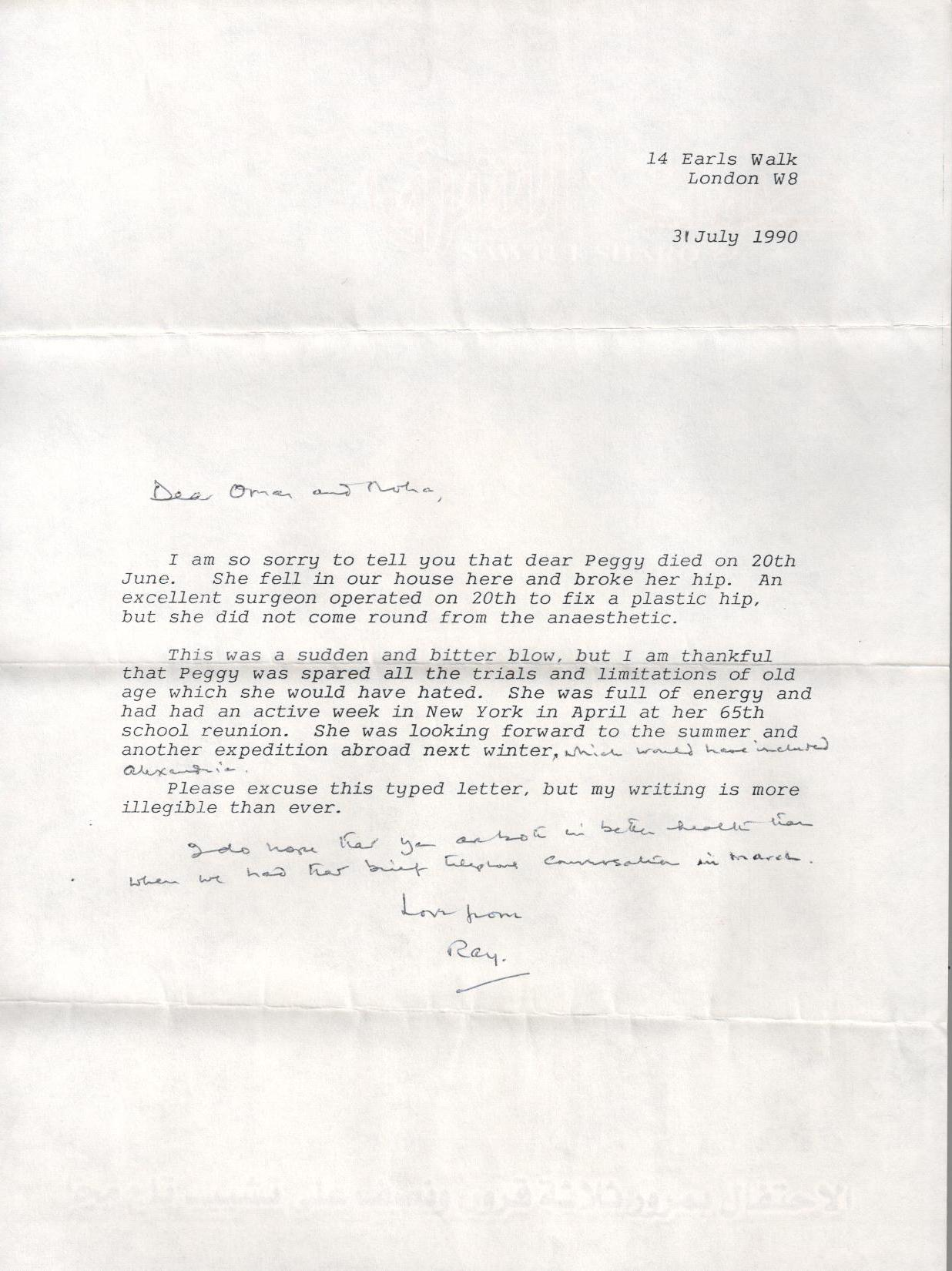
Typed and hand written letter from Ray Lewthwaite informing of his wife's Death. Dated 31 July 1990

In 1970, Sharaf assumed the position of Doyen of the Consular Corps in Hong Kong. The position of Doyen would bring Sharaf closer and into regular contact with the Governor General of the colony. At the time, the Governor General of Hong Kong was Sir David Trench (1915–1988, and in office from 1964 to 1971), a veteran of the British colonial service. The position of Doyen would also bring Sharaf and his wife Noha closer to the-then director of protocol in Hong Kong, Brigadier Sir Rainald Lewthwaite OBE (1913–2003), aka Ray Lewthwaite, and his American-born wife Margaret Edmonds Lewthwaite (MBE) (1907–1990), aka Peggy Lewthwaite. Ray Lewthwaite, a former British officer who had served in Egypt and North Africa during World War II, and his wife Margaret would be lifelong friends of the Sharaf's, being house guests at their Beijing embassy residence in the Eighties. The Sharafs were particularly impressed with Margaret, who, besides being a diplomatic hostess, was an accomplished author and painter.

=== UNHCR ===
Under secondment from the government of the U.A.R, Sharaf was appointed as Deputy Representative of the United Nations High Commissioner for Refugees, Middle East (1961–1966). He was involved with providing solutions to the plight of refugees and assistance to internally displaced persons on the African continent, ensuring their protection, well-being and relocation when necessary. The Cairo UNHCR Middle East office was established in 1954, and supervised international humanitarian aid and assistance to a number of African countries including Algeria, Rwanda, Togo and Angola, among others. As deputy representative of the UNHCR Middle East, he actively assisted in his organization's participation in the first Afro-Asian consultative meeting held at the Arab League in Cairo, in February 1964. His direct superior was Prince Sadruddin Aga Khan, who at the time was still deputy High Commissioner of the UNHCR. Sadruddin Aga Khan was elected High Commissioner of the UNHCR in December 1965.

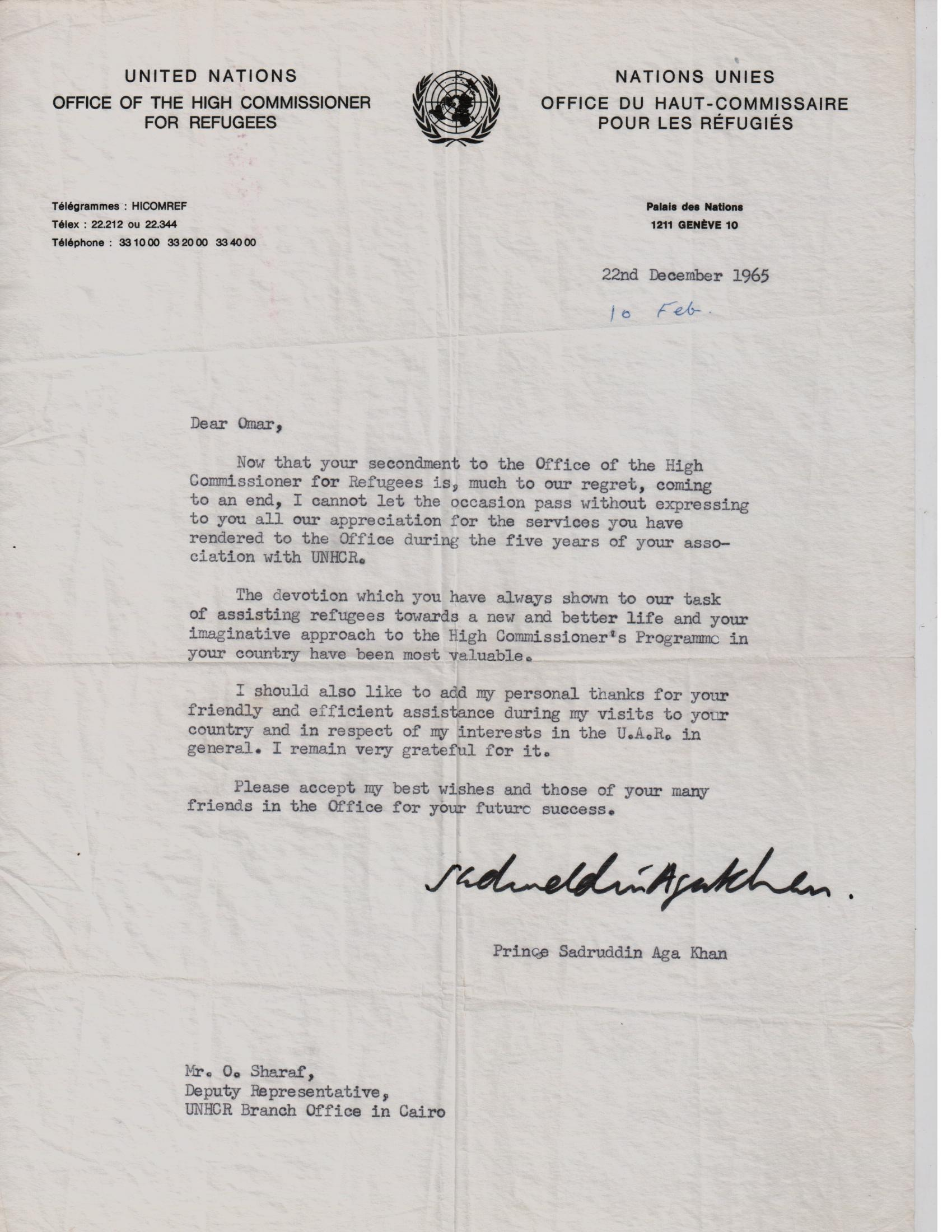
Letter from Prince Sadruddin Aga Khan, Dec. 1965

Prior to and upon assuming his new position as High Commissioner, Sadruddin Aga Khan had unsuccessfully lobbied the Egyptian government, from August till December 1965, to have Sharaf continue in his tenure as deputy representative of the UNHCR Middle East.

=== United Nations ===
Having completed his tour of duty at Ankara in 1957, Sharaf was posted to the Egyptian mission to the United Nations at New York City. At the United Nations, he was an alternate to his colleague Abdel Hamid Abdel-Ghani, on the 14-member country Sub-Commission on Prevention of Discrimination and Protection of Minorities. Distinguished members on the commission included Judge Philip Halpern of the United States. In January 1960, the sub-commission unanimously adopted a resolution condemning "Anti-Semitism, Religious and Racial Prejudices", amongst the first to be adopted by a sub-commission at the World Organization. Sharaf attended numerous commission meetings and conferences at the UN dealing with complex legal and human rights issues like non-refoulement, as well as one on the essential topic of the standardization of geographical names.

His colleagues at the United Nations mission included a group of outstanding Egyptian diplomats who would later in their careers assume positions of importance among them was Mohamed Riad, Egypt's Minister of State for Foreign Affairs, Abdel Raouf El Reedy, long-serving Ambassador to the United States, and Mohamed Shaker, Ambassador to the United Kingdom. When Sharaf joined the Egyptian mission at New York it was headed by ambassador Omar Loutfi, one of Egypt's most distinguished, accomplished and vocal diplomats. Loutfi was a fervent nationalist who opposed superpower expansion and involvement in the Middle East. He would instill in Sharaf a respect for the importance of upholding international law in an increasingly divided and polarized world. Loutfi would later assume the position of Under-Secretary-General of the United Nations for Special Political Affairs. Loutfi, a one-time President of the United Nations Security Council, would die on the premises of the UN building at New York of a heart attack on 17 May 1963.

Sharaf was in New York in May 1958 when his younger brother Sami, considered one of President Nasser's most trusted aides, arrived to assist in the resolution of the budding political crisis in Lebanon. Immediately upon his arrival at Idlewild Airport (since renamed JFK International Airport), Sami was approached with an invitation from the-then CIA Director Allen Dulles to be a guest of the agency while in New York. Sami politely declined the invitation and conveniently opted to stay at his elder brother's apartment instead. At the time Sharaf, first secretary at the Egyptian mission to the UN, was residing at 240 East 76th Street, New York. Sami was again in New York with his elder brother in September 1960, preparing for President Nasser's only visit to U.S. to attend and deliver a speech at the General Assembly of the United Nations.

=== Egyptian Soviet Friendship Society ===
In March 1987, attempts were made to thaw and revive Egyptian–Soviet relations by re-establishing the Egyptian Soviet Friendship Society. Sharaf, with his long experience in eastern bloc countries, was hand-picked by Boutros Boutros Ghali, then Egyptian Minister of State for Foreign Affairs, to become secretary of the friendship society. At the time, the society's president was Ghali himself. Prominent Egyptians from diverse fields of interest were invited to join the society. Both men would travel to Moscow to participate in the society's meetings and gatherings of prominent politicians, diplomats, businessmen, academicians, historians, linguists and enthusiasts of Egyptian Soviet relations. Sharaf's visits to Moscow and his extensive travels in the Soviet hinterland convinced him that the Soviet Union was not the superpower he once knew, he did not, however, predict its sudden collapse.

=== Politics ===
==== The Impact of May 1971 ====
Sharaf worked as a diplomat for nearly four decades under both royal and republican political regimes in Egypt. His younger brother Sami would exert influence on the political landscape of Egypt. Sami would eventually assume the position of minister for presidential affairs in the regime of president Nasser. Sami was one of Nasser's closest and most trusted aides, and considered the second-most powerful man after the president. His political demise came about when he tended his resignation from office in May 1971, after Nasser's death in September 1970, to president Anwar Sadat. He was put on trial in a "Military Revolutionary Court" and convicted of High Treason for attempting to overthrow the president. The court initially handed him a death sentence, which was commuted to hard labor for life. In Egypt this would be known as the Corrective Revolution. Sami's political demise naturally affected the prospects of Sharaf and the clan, including accusations made at them and their cousin, ambassador Essam Hawas. Sadat did not persecute the two elder Sharaf brothers, Omar and Ezz El-din, bestowing on Omar the Order of the Republic Second Class in February 1973, and appointing Ezz-Eldin as ambassador to Madagascar.

==== Relationship with Mubarak ====
Sharaf first came to the attention of then Vice-president Hosni Mubarak in 1979, when, as director of the Asian department at the MFA, both he and ambassador Dr. Osama El-Baz accompanied the vice-president on a tour of the Far East, which began with Indonesia. The tour included visiting Malaysia, Singapore, Bangladesh and India. Sharaf's extensive knowledge of Asian affairs, his wit and humor made him amenable to Mubarak. Mubarak would later appoint Sharaf as his ambassador to China. Mubarak would also make his first of several visits to China as president of Egypt during Sharaf's tenure in Beijing. Later, Mubarak would also consent to Sharaf's appointment to the position of Assistant Secretary General of the Arab League. Upon his death, the president and the Secretary General of the Arab League would both mourn Sharaf's loss.

== Lifestyle and legacy ==
As evident from photographs taken at various stages in his life, Sharaf was a strong built man, but light on his feet in spite of it, only losing substantial weight towards the end of his life as an indirect result of advanced diabetes. He was a chain smoker till well into his mid-fifties, and was regarded by many as a sanguine, gregarious, and happy-go-lucky person. He valued his family and often took them along on his various travels. He was a moderate person, with few enemies compared to some members of his family clan. Sharaf had no conflict furthering Egypt's interests including those with Israel by maintaining cordial and polite relations with his Israeli Counterpart in Stockholm, ambassador Mordecay Kidron, who also happened to be his next door neighbor. He also chose, out of the available pictures at his disposal, to have printed in a local Cairo monthly magazine a photograph taken of him welcoming, as doyen of the consular corps, Pope Paul VI to Hong Kong at Kai Tak International Airport in December 1970, reflecting his sense of religious tolerance as a Muslim.

He was a thinker, a prolific reader, especially of military history, and a linguist who was proficient in several languages. A conversationalist known for his charm and excellent social and people skills, he had an ability to establish rapport and win people over and achieve consensus. Sharaf could be obdurate, refusing to comply with the instructions of international border officials to postpone his travel till daylight and insisting on his right, as a diplomat, to free and unfettered movement across borders, only to be told of the impossibility of crossing the border at night due to dangers associated with the presence of active mine fields.

He was a keen Contract Bridge player, who regularly organized bridge tournaments at his residence. He was also an enthusiastic sportsman and a lifelong member of the Egyptian Shooting Federation, becoming chairman of the Rifle Committee in 1979 and elected, later in life, to its governing board of directors. He had a fondness for the culinary arts and gastronomy, and was a connoisseur of fine tea.

Sharaf's impact and legacy was varied: as director of the powerful Diplomatic and Consular Corps department at the MFA (1973–1974), he was pivotal in establishing a more egalitarian recruitment system, based on meritocracy, emphasizing the need for Egyptian diplomatic and consular corps officers to be committed, multi-disciplined, cultured, socially refined, with proven linguistic abilities, and an aptitude for foreign travel. Later, as director of the Asian department, he managed to develop a small following of diplomats and entice them to specialize in Asian affairs, especially China.

The three senior Sharaf brothers, Omar, Ezz-Eldin and Sami, would be occasional political commentators on international political affairs at the Egyptian Radio and Television Union (ERTU), as well as on Arabic-speaking regional satellite channels. Both Omar and Ezz-Eldin were also regular lecturers on Far Eastern and South Asian political and military affairs at Egypt's various military, national security, diplomatic, and academic institutions.

=== Death ===
Sharaf spent the last few years of his life living at his summer house west of Alexandria near Borg El Arab on the Mediterranean coast. He had been suffering from the painful effects of advanced diabetes. On 7 September 1993, his health suddenly deteriorated, and upon the advice of specialists was transferred and admitted to the intensive care unit at a hospital in Heliopolis, Cairo. He died of a massive heart attack on the evening of 8 September, surrounded by many of his family and friends.

== Honours ==
Honours
date	Award	Nation	Ribbon
1984	Order of the Polar Star, Grand Cross	Sweden	
1977	Order of Merit, First Class	Egypt	
1973	Order of the Republic, Second Class	Egypt	

Diplomatic posts
Unknown	Assistant Secretary General of the Arab League; 1984–1985	Succeeded by Ahmed Kadri
Preceded by Ezz El Arab Amin	Ambassador to the People's Republic of China; 1982–1985	Succeeded by Ahmed Selim
Diplomatic posts
Preceded by Aziz Hamza	Ambassador to the Kingdom of Sweden; 1979–1982	Succeeded by Hassan Allam
