= Allam =

Allam is a surname. Notable people with the surname include:

- Abdul Qadir al-Allam (1919–2003), Libyan politician
- Ahmad Allam-Mi (born 1948), Chadian diplomat
- Ahmed Issam Allam (born 1931), Egyptian gymnast
- Andrew Allam (1655–1685), English writer
- Assem Allam (1939–2022), Egyptian businessman
- Boumedienne Allam (born 1979), French-Algerian rugby player
- Dalia Allam (born 1980), Egyptian synchronized swimmer
- Ehab Allam (born 1971), British-Egyptian business executive
- Hannah Allam (born 1977), American journalist and reporter
- Hassan Allam (1903–1976), Egyptian builder
- Ibrahim Allam, Egyptian paralympic shot putter
- Jeff Allam (born 1954), British racing driver
- Magdi Allam (born 1952), Egyptian journalist and writer
- Mohamed Abdel Khalek Allam (1921–2011), Egyptian diver
- Mohamed Nasr Eldin Allam, Egyptian engineer
- Najla' Jalal Al Sayyed Allam, Egyptian writer and researcher
- Nida Allam (born 1993), American politician
- Peter Allam (born 1959), British sailor
- Rodney John Allam (born 1940), English chemical engineer
- Roger Allam (born 1953), English actor
- Shawki Allam (born 1961), 19th Grand Mufti of Egypt
