= Prostitution in Algeria =

Prostitution in Algeria is illegal under Article 343 (Ordinance of 17 June 1975) of the Algerian Penal Code. This article also prohibits the use of prostitution services, pimping, living with a prostitute, soliciting, and forcing others into prostitution.

According to the French Office for the Protection of Refugees and Stateless Persons (OFPRA), until 2011, there were 19 brothels under police control out of the 171 that had previously existed in Algeria during the French colonial period, as was the case in Tunisia.

Despite the de jure prohibition by the Algerian Penal Code, clandestine prostitution exists in contemporary Algerian society. Men are also involved in homosexual and heterosexual prostitution.

== History ==
=== Ottoman rule ===
During Ottoman rule, prostitution was tolerated and regulated.

A class of prostituted women was established in order to serve the celibate corps of janissaries sent to Algeria after the Ottoman occupation in the 16th century, mostly composed of Black (usually slave) women who had left their enslavers.

An official called the Mezouar was in charge of regulating prostitution. This official was always a Moor. The position was lucrative, as he collected a monthly levy per prostitute. He kept a register of prostitutes, and the women were not allowed to leave the brothels and public baths they worked in. A request for a prostitute was processed by the official, who authorized the prostitute to make an appointment and then taxed the fee for state revenue; however, prostitutes selected to serve ethnic Ottoman Turks were exempted from taxation. Any free Algerian woman, including a prostitute, could be killed by drowning if she violated the law by having sex with a European male slave.

Prostitution was also connected to slavery in Algeria. The Islamic Law formally prohibited prostitution. However, since the principle of concubinage in Islam in Islamic Law allowed a man to have sexual intercourse with his female slave, prostitution in the Islamic world was commonly practiced by a pimp selling his female slave on the slave market to a client, who was then allowed to have sex with her as her new owner; the client would then cancel his purchase and return the slave to her pimp on the pretext of discontent, which was a legal and accepted method for prostitution in the Islamic world.

Prior to the French takeover in 1830, it was estimated that there were 300 to 500 prostitutes in Algiers. The women were Moorish, Arab, and sub-Saharan Africans. Jews were not permitted to become prostitutes.

=== French rule ===
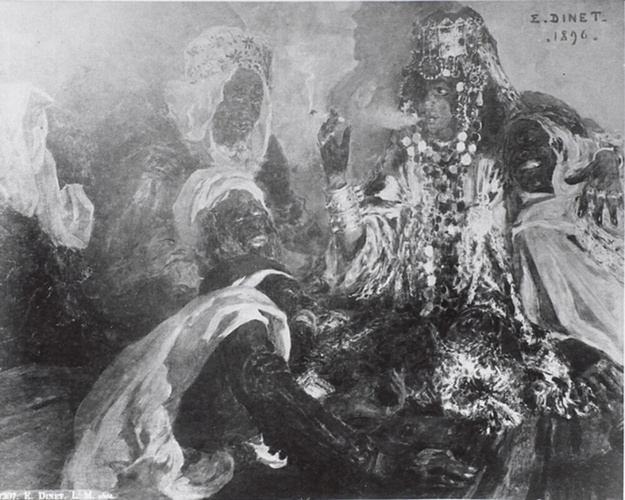
The Courtesan by Nasreddine Dinet (1896).

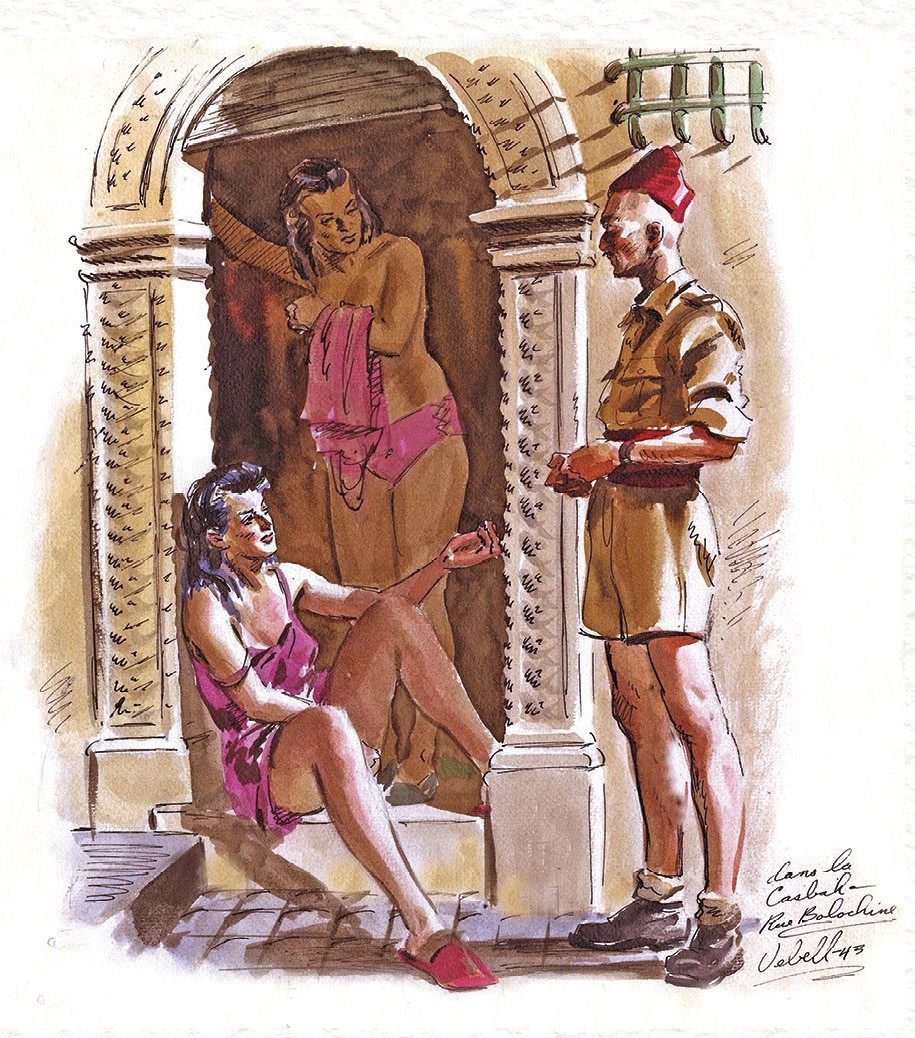
Imaginary drawing of French colonial soldier haggling for a better price from a prostitute on the Rue Balochine in the native Casbah of Algiers, North Africa – Edward Vebell – 1943

After French colonization in 1830, the French authorities introduced regulatory prostitution to try to prevent the spread of STIs. The regulation system was based on the Ottoman regulations that were previously in place, and the Mezouar was retained, although he had to pay an annual fee of 2,046 francs. Compulsory medical examinations for prostitutes were introduced by decree in July 1830. The main articles of the decree read:

"We, Civil Intendant of French possessions in North Africa; Having regard to Articles 10 and 46 of Title I of the Law of 19–27 July 1791, considering that experience has made it necessary to revise the regulations in force concerning public girls; have stopped and stop the following:

Art. 1. Any girl known to be engaged in prostitution shall be registered by the Commissioner of Police, Head of the Central Office, in a register kept for that purpose in the said office.
Art. 6. As of 1 October, all public women will be required to be visited twice a month and at intervals of fifteen days to have their state of health ascertained.
Art. 7. This visit will take place at the clinic. However, public women who wish to be visited at home may obtain the faculty by paying an extraordinary fee of 3 francs per visit, as a fee, in favor of the doctor.
Art. 11. The public girls visited at the clinic and recognized as suffering from venereal diseases will be held in this establishment for immediate treatment. As for those who would be visited in their homes and who would be in the same situation, they will be taken to the dispensary by the Police Commissioner.
Art. 12. To meet the expenses which will result from both the visit and the treatment of the public wives, it will be paid for and by each of these women, at the time of the visit, a remuneration of 5 francs, or 10 francs a month.
Art. 22. No public girl will be able to leave the city to visit the surrounding tribes without the written permission of the Police Commissioner, head of the Central Office; the same permission will be required to go to the feasts that are given either in the interior or outside the city.
Art. 24. The remuneration to be paid for each of the girls whose application will be made remains fixed, for the exterior, at 10 francs, and for the interior, at 5 francs."

In spite of the regulations, there were women who worked on the streets illegally. As there was no longer a prohibition for Jewish women, some turned to prostitution.

Number of registered prostitutes and their ethnicity in Algiers by year (data from the dispensary of Algiers)
	1838	1839	1840	1841	1842	1847	1848	1849	1850	1851
Indigenous	254	257	254	299	282	203	181	183	248	170
European (Non-French)	63	67	91	95	97	93	77	90	89	60
French	31	34	44	51	70	107	78	82	113	81
Jewish	27	38	37	43	38	26	28	22	19	12
Black	0	17	20	19	23	22	23	24	24	16
Total	375	413	446	512	510	441	387	395	479	342

Brothels were established in all the main garrison towns, generally in the Muslim quarters so as not to offend the European residents. In 1942, the morality police recorded 46 brothels, 79 hotels, 600 furnished apartments, and a hundred clandestine houses used for prostitution in Algiers alone. These numbers remained about the same until independence in 1962.

==== Ouled Naïl ====
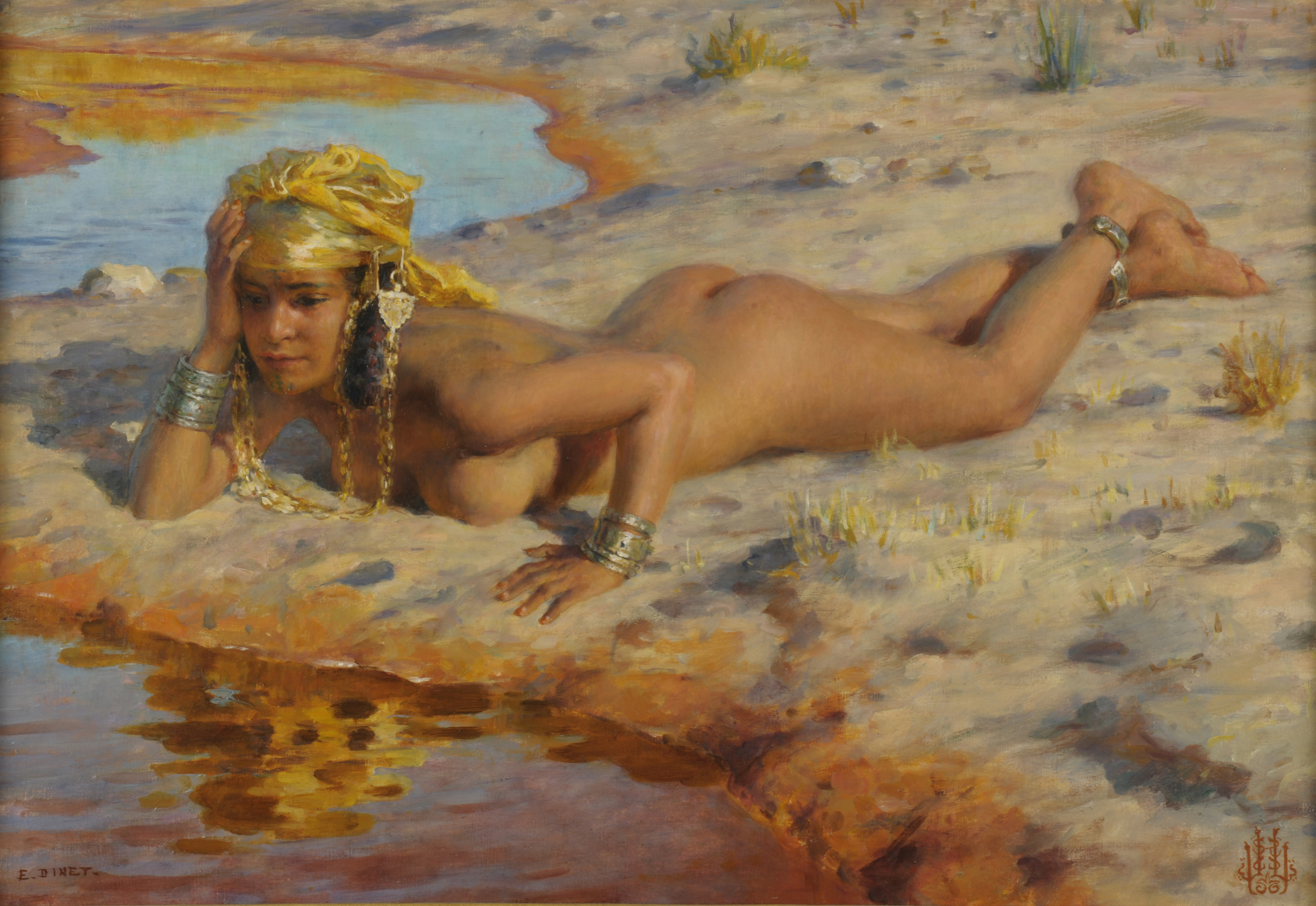
On the Banks of the Wadi (1898).

Scholars further situate such representations within a broader colonial and orientalist sexual imaginary that cast "the Orient"—and particularly Arab and Muslim societies—as spaces of heightened sensuality, harems and readily available women, thereby naturalising the idea that non-European women were exceptionally erotic and accessible to Western men. Malek Alloula has shown how early twentieth-century French picture postcards of "Algerian" women, often staged in pseudo-harems and posed for a metropolitan male gaze, produced a "colonial harem" that owed more to European fantasy than to Algerian domestic realities. Christelle Taraud's studies of colonial prostitution and of "Mauresques" in photography, together with Marnia Lazreg's work on Algerian women, demonstrate how eroticised images of North African women circulated alongside regulatory systems of sex work, turning Arab and Berber women into symbols of imperial domination and into commodities in a racialised sexual marketplace. This wider pattern of colonial "sexual romanticism" about the Arab and Muslim East helped popularise stock figures such as the Ouled Naïl dancer-courtesan in travel writing, painting and tourism, often with little relation to the actual diversity of women’s lives in Algerian society.

Some historians claim that some women from the Ouled Naïl tribal confederation, an Arab, Hilali-descended, Arabic-speaking pastoral group from the highlands of central Algeria, became well known in the colonial period as dancers and entertainers in towns such as Biskra and Bou Saâda; many of those who entered this milieu appear in the sources as socially marginal women, effectively detached from their tribal communities and male kin, including runaways, repudiated wives, urban migrants and, in some cases, former slaves or other dependants. Recent historical and feminist studies argue that their position cannot be reduced either to “dancers only” or equated in a simple way with prostitution: their work combined paid performance and hospitality with, in some cases, sexual relationships organised as long-term patronage or concubinage rather than per-act commercial sex work.

When the French authorities imposed a system of regulated prostitution, many of these performers were registered as filles publiques and concentrated in tolerated quarters, fixing an association between the name “Ouled Naïl” and prostitution in colonial administrative and popular discourse. Travel accounts and visual sources describe their elaborate dress and jewellery, while later tourist literature accentuated a more eroticised and spectacular image of these dancers, a change often interpreted as a product of colonial economies of spectacle rather than an original tribal custom.

By the late nineteenth and early twentieth centuries the term Nailiya (from Ouled Naïl) could designate a registered prostitute irrespective of actual tribal origin, and streets or red-light districts named Rue des Ouled Naïl functioned as centres of regulated sex work in towns such as Biskra and Bou Saâda. Archival and military sources further indicate that some North African women – frequently labelled “Ouled Naïl” in French military slang, whether or not they belonged genealogically to the confederation – were recruited or coerced to work in bordels militaires de campagne in Algeria and Indochina, including at Điện Biên Phủ; many of the Nailiyat involved were socially marginal women effectively detached from male kin authority, such as widows, repudiated wives, migrants and, in some cases, former slaves or other dependants.

=== Rahbat al-Jammal ===
During Ottoman rule, resting stops, khans, were built for travellers and their horse and camels. In Constantine, the khans were located at Rahbat al-Jammal. Following the French occupation, the buildings were turned into brothels for the French soldiers. The city elders forbade Algerian women from entering the street. Although the brothels closed down in the 1980s, the ban on women entering the street continues to the present times.

=== Post-independence ===
As a result of Arabization of the country, the rise of Islamism and the civil unrest following the economic downturn caused by the 1980s oil glut, brothels were banned in 1982, forcing many of the prostitutes to work on the streets. However, some of the country's 171 brothels were allowed to remain open under the close scrutiny of the police. In 2011 there were 19 supervised brothels operating. By 2015, the number of brothels operating with the complicity of the Algerian authorities had reduced to two.

== Sex trafficking ==
Human traffickers exploit domestic and foreign victims in Algeria for sex trafficking. Undocumented sub-Saharan migrants, primarily from Mali, Niger, Burkina Faso, Cameroon, Guinea, Liberia, and Nigeria, are most vulnerable to sex trafficking in Algeria, mainly due to their irregular migration status, poverty, and language barriers. Unaccompanied women and women travelling with children are also particularly vulnerable to exploitation.

Sub-Saharan African women, often en route to neighbouring countries or Europe, enter Algeria voluntarily but illegally, frequently with the assistance of smugglers or criminal networks. Many migrants, impeded in their initial attempts to reach Europe, remain in Algeria until they can continue their journey. While facing limited opportunities in Algeria, many migrants illegally engage in prostitution to earn money to pay for their onward journey to Europe, which puts them at high risk of exploitation.

Some migrants become indebted to smugglers, who subsequently exploit them in sex trafficking upon arrival in Algeria. For example, female migrants in the southern city of Tamanrasset, the main entry point into Algeria for migrants and for the majority of foreign trafficking victims, are subjected to debt bondage as they work to repay smuggling debts through forced prostitution.

Some migrants also fall into debt to fellow nationals who control segregated ethnic neighbourhoods in Tamanrasset; these individuals pay migrants’ debts to smugglers and then force the migrants into prostitution. Foreign women and children, primarily sub-Saharan African migrants, are exploited in sex trafficking in bars and informal brothels, typically by members of their own communities, in Tamanrasset and Algiers.

The government did not investigate, prosecute, or convict any perpetrators for sex trafficking crimes in 2018, despite reports that sex trafficking occurred in Algeria, especially among the migrant population.

In 2020, the United States Department of State Office to Monitor and Combat Trafficking in Persons downgraded Algeria's rank from "Tier 2 Watch List" to a "Tier 3" country.
