= Nasruddin (name) =

- Gender: masculine
- Language: Arabic

Origin
- Meaning: 'defender of the faith'

Other names
- Variant forms: Nasir al-Din, Naseeruddin, Nasiruddin, Nasir ad-Din, Nasir ud-Din, Naser el-Din
- Related names: Nasr, Nasir, Nasrallah

Nasruddin (Arabic: نصرالدین, lit. 'defender of the faith') was originally an honorific title and is a masculine given name and surname of Arabic origin. There are many variant spellings in English due to transliteration including Nasir al-Din, and Nasiruddin.

The most notable person with this name is the 13th-century philosopher, Sufi and wise man from Turkey, Nasreddin Hodja. Other people with the title or name include:

== People with the given name Nasruddin ==
- Nasreddin or Nasreddin Hodja, 13th century Seljuq satirist, populist philosopher, Sufi and wise man
- Nasruddin (reigned 1690–1710), 15th Sultan of Brunei
- Nasruddin Khan, emir of Kokand 1875–1876
- Nasruddin Mohseni (fl. from 2002), Afghan politician

== People with the surname Nasruddin ==
- Azman Nasruddin (born 1972), Malaysian politician
- Nadhirah Nasruddin (born 1994), Malaysian cricketer

== See also ==
- ad-Din, Arabic name suffix
- Nasir al-Din (disambiguation)
- Nasreddin (crater)
- Molla Nasraddin (magazine)
- Nimatnama-i-Nasiruddin-Shahi, 16th-century medieval Indian cookbook, written in Persian language
