= Nasir al-Din Mahmud =

Nasir al-Din Mahmud may be:

- Nasir ad-Din Mahmud, Zengid Emir of Mossul 1219–1234
- Nasir al-Din Muhammad (r. 1261–1318), Mihrabanid malik of Sistan.
- Nasir al-Din Mahmud (Artuqid) (r. 1200–1222) of the Artuqids of Hisnkeyfa.

== See also ==
- Nasir al-Din (disambiguation), various meanings including a given name
