= Muezzin (Dinet) =

1922 portrait by Nasreddine Dinet

- Muezzin (English)
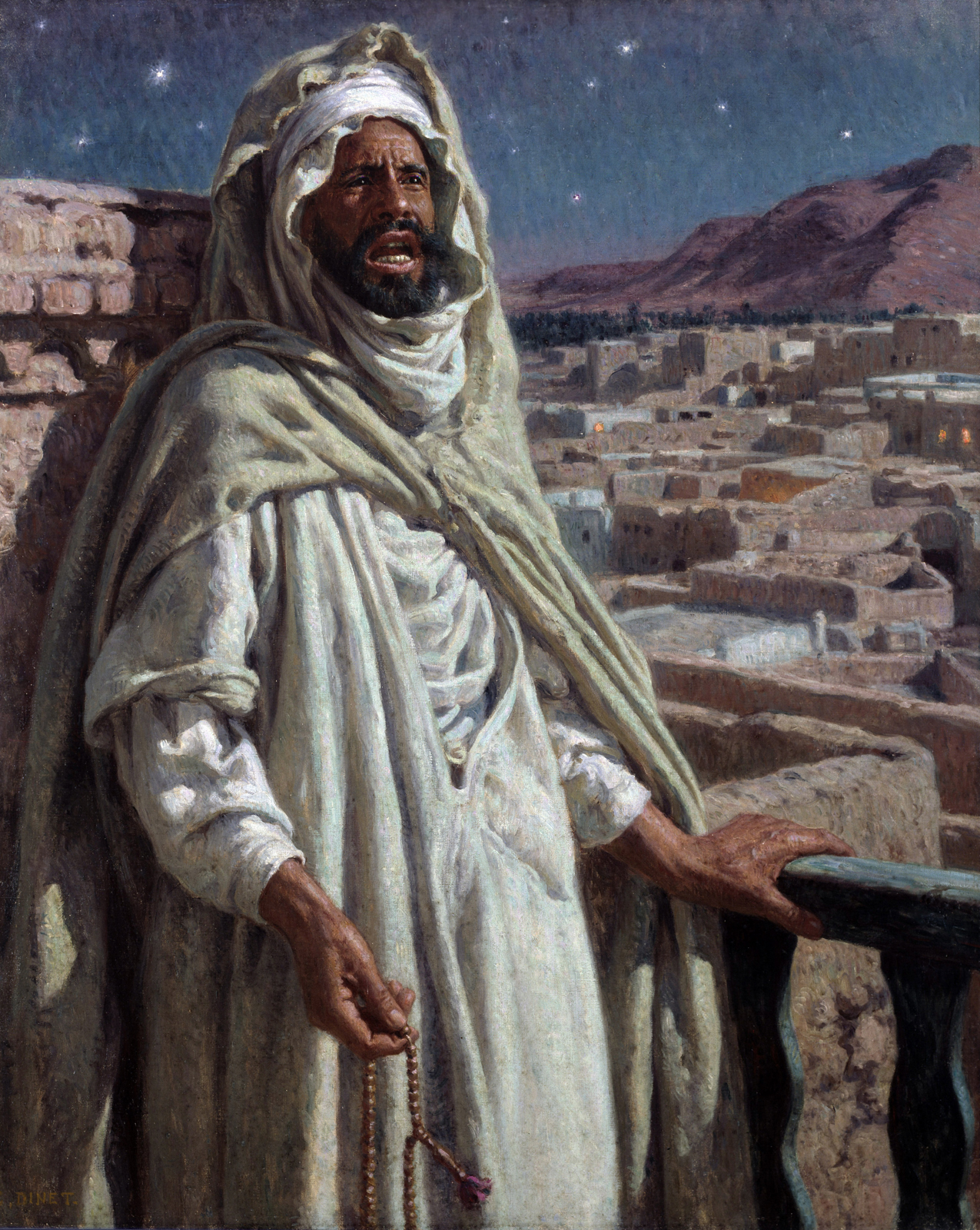
- Artist: Nasreddine Dinet
- Year: 1922
- Medium: Oil-on-canvas
- Dimensions: 100 cm × 81 cm (39 in × 32 in)
- Location: Musée des beaux-arts de Marseille, Marseille

Muezzin is a portrait created in 1922, by the French artist Nasreddine Dinet.

== Description ==
Muezzin is an oil painting by Nasreddine Dinet, created in Algeria in 1922, depicting a muezzin’s call to prayer at night. The work has been the property of the City of Marseille since 1944, following a bequest, and is part of the collection of the Musée des beaux-arts de Marseille ·.

In 2024, the painting is being presented among the works in the exhibition Nasreddine Dinet, Algerian Passions at the Institut du monde arabe.

== See also ==
- Orientalism
- Islam
