= Nasiruddin =

- Gender: masculine
- Language: Arabic: نصرالدین

Origin
- Meaning: 'defender of the faith'

Other names
- Variant forms: Nasir al-Din, Nasruddin, Naseeruddin, Nasir ad-Din, Nasir ud-Din, Naser el-Din
- Related names: Nasir, Nasrallah

Nasiruddin (Arabic: نصرالدین, lit. 'defender of the faith') was originally an honorific title and is a masculine given name and surname of Arabic origin. There are many variant spellings in English due to transliteration including Nasir al-Din, and Nasruddin. Notable people with the title or name include:

== People with the given name Nasiruddin ==
- Nasiruddin Mahmud (eldest son of Iltutmish) (died 1229), ruler of Bengal
- Nasiruddin Mahmud Shah, Sultan of Delhi (1246–1266), Muslim Turkic ruler
- Nasiruddin Bughra Khan, governor and then Sultan of Bengal (1281–1291)
- Nasiruddin Chiragh Dehlavi (1274–1356), mystic-poet and Sufi saint
- Nasiruddin Mahmud Shah of Bengal (died 1459), sultan of Bengal
- Nasiruddin Nasrat Shah (died 1532), sultan of Bengal
- Nasiruddin Khan (c. 1948 – 2018), an Indian politician from West Bengal
- Nasiruddin Ahmed Pintu (1967–2015), Bangladeshi politician
- Nasiruddin Yousuff (fl. from 1973), Bangladeshi stage and film director
- Nasiruddin Faruque (born 1983), Bangladeshi cricketer
- Nasiruddin Chowdhury (born 1985), Bangladeshi footballer
- Nasiruddin Nasir (born 1992), Malaysian actor

== People with the middle name or father's name ==
- Ismail Nasiruddin of Terengganu (1907–1979), Yang di-Pertuan Agong of Malaysia
- Muhammad Nasiruddin al-Albani (1914–1999), Syrian-Albanian Islamic scholar

== People with the surname Nasiruddin ==
- Advocate Nasiruddin (1892–1949), lawyer and political and social leader from Bhopal, India
- Mir Mohammad Nasiruddin (fl. from 1990s), Bangladeshi politician
- Mohammad Nasiruddin (1888–1994), Bangladeshi journalist
- Shaikh Nasiruddin (1916–1991), an Indian cricketer
- Syed Nasiruddin, a Sufi saint and military leader associated with the spread of Islam in Bengal in the 14th century

== See also ==
- ad-Din, Arabic name suffix
- Nimatnama-i-Nasiruddin-Shahi, 16th-century medieval Indian cookbook, written in Persian language
- Nasir al-Din (disambiguation)
