= Slave of love and Light of the eyes =

1900 painting by Nasreddine Dinet

Esclave d'amour et Lumière des yeux : Abd-el-Gheram et Nouriel-Aîn, Légende arabe
- Slave of Love and Light of the Eyes: Abd-el-Gheram and Nouriel-Aîn, an Arabic Legend (English)
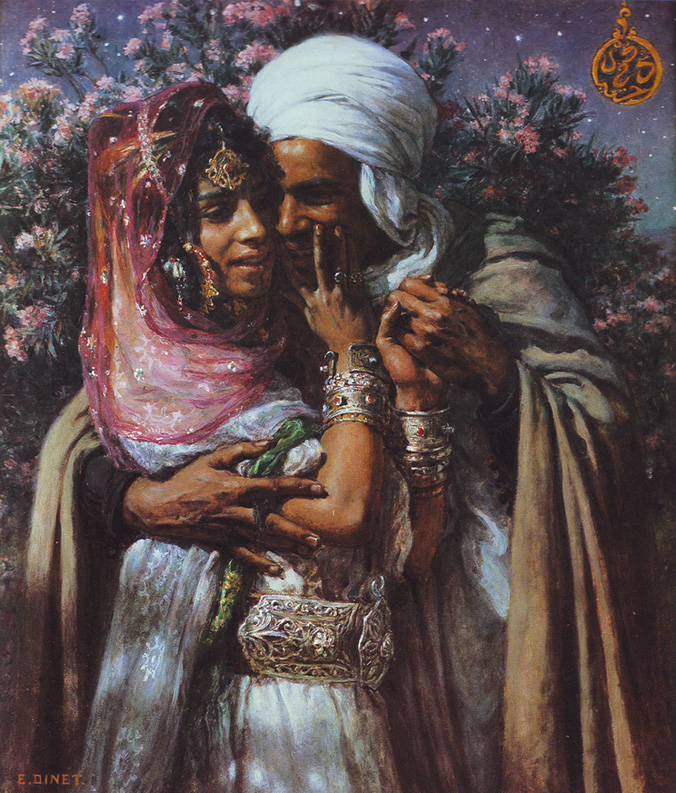
- Artist: Nasreddine Dinet
- Year: 1900
- Medium: Oil-on-canvas
- Dimensions: 56,5 cm × 49,5 cm (222 in × 195 in)
- Location: Musée d'Orsay, Paris

Slave of love and Light of the eyes (French: Esclave d'amour et Lumière des yeux Arabic: أسيرُ الحبِّ ونورُ العيون) is a 1900 genre painting by the French artist Nasreddine Dinet.

== Description ==
Slave of love and Light of the eyes is an oil painting by Nasreddine Dinet, created in 1900. The painting depicts the Arab legend of two lovers: Abd-el-Gheram and Nouriel-Aîn. It is housed at the Musée d'Orsay in Paris.

The painting was purchased by the French Third Republic in 1901.

Based on the painting by Étienne Dinet, the engraver Camille-Alexandre Lesage produced a print in 1913 titled Esclave d'amour. A copy of it is held at the Petit Palais in Paris.

In 2024, the painting is being presented among the works in the exhibition Nasreddine Dinet, Algerian Passions at the Institut du monde arabe.

== See also ==
- Orientalism
