= Schremser =

Brewery in Schrems, Austria

- Native name: Bierbrauerei Schrems GmbH
- Industry: Brewery
- Founded: 1410
- Headquarters: Niederschremserstrasse 1, 3943 Schrems, Austria
- Website: schremser.at

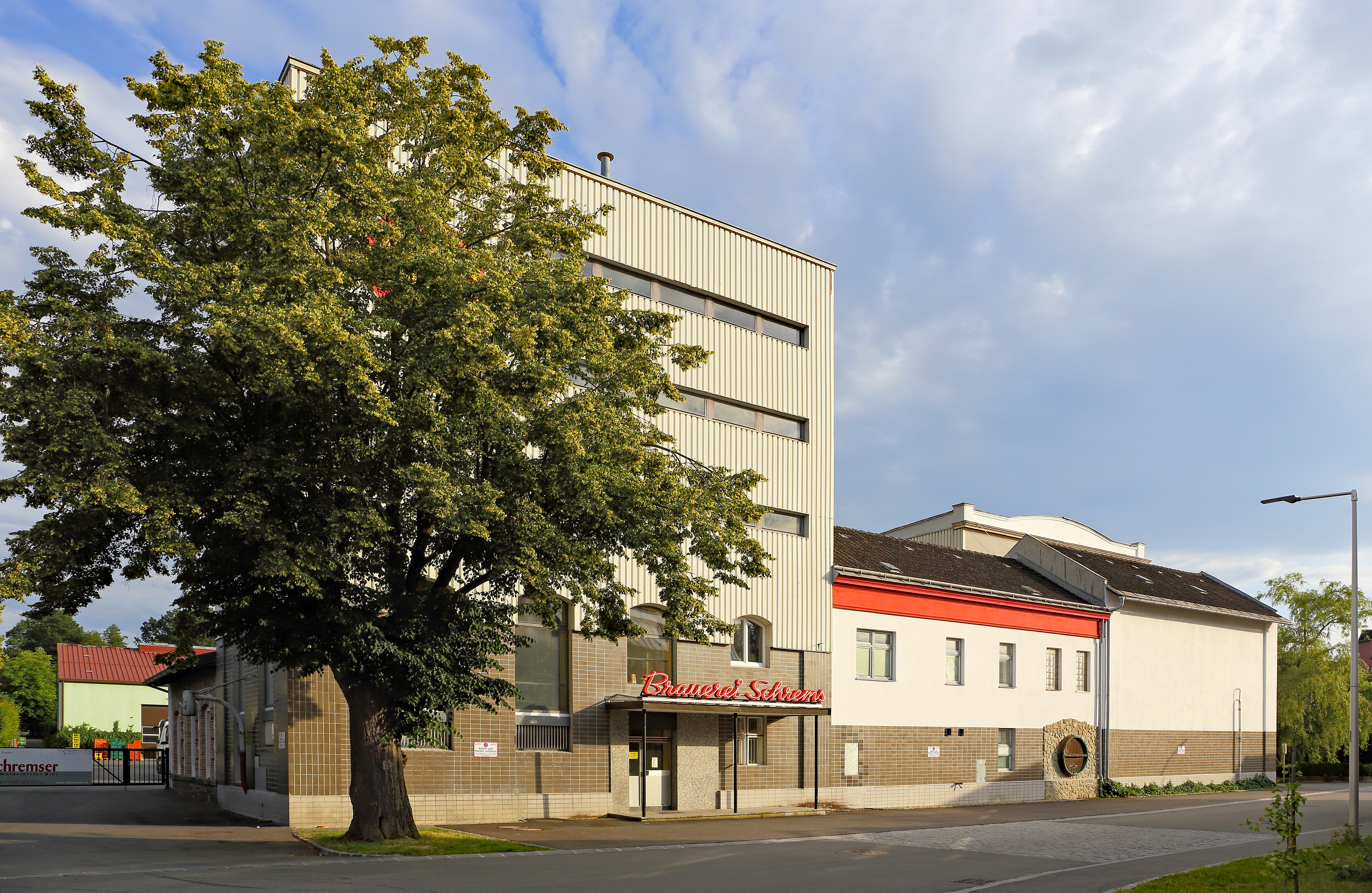
Private brewery Trojan (Schremser Bier) in Schrems

Schremser is a traditional brewery in Schrems town, Waldviertel region in Austria, first written record about it is from 1410.

In 1838 Jakob Trojan acquired the Schrems brewery and since then, the company has been family-owned.

In 1875 Theodore Trojan understood the need for a machine-driven brewery and installed a steam engine. Today the beer is naturally brewed to the purity from 1516 and under constant quality tests in the brewery laboratory.

== See also ==
- List of oldest companies
