= Nasir al-Din =

- Gender: masculine
- Language: Arabic

Origin
- Meaning: defender of the faith

Other names
- Variant forms: Nasruddin, Naseeruddin, Nasiruddin, Nasir ad-Din, Nasir ud-Din, Naser el-Din
- Related names: Nasir, Nasrallah

Nasir al-Din (Arabic: نصیر الدین or ناصرالدین or نصر الدين, 'defender of the faith'), was originally a honorific title and is a masculine given name and surname of Arabic origin. There are many variant spellings in English due to transliteration including Nasruddin, and Nasiruddin. Notable people with the title or name include:

== Politics and government ==
- Nasir ad-Din Mahmud I of Great Seljuq, sultan of the Seljuk Empire 1092–1094
- Al-Afdal Shahanshah (1066–1121), Fatimid vizier of Egypt, nicknamed Nasir al-Din
- Nasir ad-Din Qabacha, Muslim Turkic governor of Multan from 1203
- Nasir al-Din Mahmud (reigned 1201–22), of the Artuqids of Hisnkeyfa
- Nasir ad-Din Mahmud, Zengid Emir of Mosul 1219–1234
- Nasir ad-Din al-Malik al-Mansur Ibrahim bin Asad ad-Din Shirkuh (died 1246), emir of Homs under the Ayyubid dynasty
- Nasir al-Din Abu al-Fath Abd al-Rahim ibn Abi Mansur (died 1257), Nizari Ismaili governor of Quhistan
- Al-Malik al-Said Nasir al-Din Barakah (1260–1280), Mamluk Sultan of Egypt and Syria
- Nasr al-Din (died 1292), a provincial governor of Yunnan in China during the Yuan dynasty
- Al-Nasir Nasir al-Din Muhammad ben Qalawun, or just Al-Nasir Muhammad (1285–1341), Mamluk sultan of Egypt
- Nasir al-Din Muhammad (died c. 1318), Mihrabanid malik of Sistan
- Nasir ud din Muhammad Shah III, a ruler of the Tughlaq dynasty 1390–1394
- Nasir-ud-Din Mahmud Shah Tughluq, the last sultan of the Tughlaq dynasty to rule Delhi, 1394–1413
- Nasir-ud-din Nusrat Shah Tughluq, a ruler of the Tughlaq dynasty
- An-Nasir ad-Din Muhammad (1411–1422), the son of Sayf ad-Din Tatar, and a Mamluk sultan of Egypt 1421–1422
- Nasir ad-Din al-Qasri Muhammad ibn Ahmad (died 1547), the young son of the Sultan of Fez, Sultan Ahmad
- Nasir ud-din Muhammad, or Humayun (1508–1556), Mughal Emperor
- Nasr ad-Din (died 1674), leader of the Berber tribes during the Char Bouba war
- Nasir-ud-Din Haidar Shah (1803–1837), King of Oudh
- Naser al-Din Shah Qajar (1831–1896), Shah of Persia
- Amal Nasser el-Din (born 1928), Druze Israeli author and politician
- A J M Nasir Uddin (born 1957), Bangladeshi politician
- Nasser al-Din al-Shaer, or Nasser al-Shaer, (born 1961), Palestinian politician
- Ghazi Nasr Al-Din (born 1962), Venezuelan diplomat and alleged Hezbollah supporter
- Nasir Uddin Chowdhury (fl. from 1990s), Bangladeshi politician
- Nasir Uddin (Naogaon politician) (died 2017), from Bangladesh
- Nasir Uddin (Jessore politician) (fl. from 2018), from Bangladesh

== Scholars and writers ==
- Sayyed Nasir-ud-deen Abu Yusuf Bin Saamaan (1038–1067 CE), Sufi Saint
- Sheykh Nasreddin Abul Hakayik Mahmud bin Ahmed al-Hoyi, or Ahi Evren (1169–1261), Turkish Muslim preacher
- Nasir al-Din al-Tusi (1201–1274), Persian scientist, mathematician, philosopher, physician and theologian
- Nāṣir ad-Dīn al-Albānī, Major Islamic scholar and Muhaddith.
- Nasir al-Din Nasir Hunzai (born 1917), Pakistani writer and poet
- Naseeruddin Naseer Gilani (1949–2009), a Pakistani poet and Islamic scholar of the Chishti Sufi order
- Nasreddin Lebatelier, pseudonym of Yahyah Michot (fl. from 1995), Belgian Muslim writer

== Sports ==
- Nasreddine Akli (born 1953), Algerian footballer
- Nor Saiful Zaini Nasir-ud-Din (born 1966), Malaysian hockey player
- Alain Nasreddine (born 1975), Canadian ice hockey player
- Nasreddine Kraouche (born 1979), Algerian footballer
- Ali Nasseredine (born 1983), Lebanese footballer
- Nasserredine Fillali (born 1984), Algerian boxer
- Nasr Eldin El Shigail (born 1985), a Sudanese footballer
- Nasreddine Megdich (born 1991), Qatari handball player
- Nur Nadihirah (born 1994), Malaysian cricketer
- Nassourdine Imavov (born 1995), Russian–French UFC middleweight fighter

== Other people ==
- Naseeruddin Mauzi (died 1920), Indian Khilafat Movement activist
- Nasreddin Murat-Khan (1904–1970), Russian-born Pakistani architect
- Naseeruddin Shah (born 1949), Indian film actor and director
- Mohamed Nasr Eldin Allam (born c. 1954), Egyptian water engineer and politician
- Nasreddine Dinet (1861–1929), French orientalist painter
- Naseeruddin Saami (fl. from 1950s), classical singer from Pakistan
- Nasrdin Dchar (born 1978), Dutch-Moroccan actor
- Nasir Uddin (anthropologist) (born c. 1978), Bengali anthropologist
- Attia Nasreddin, Ethiopian businessman
- Räshid Nasretdin (1920–2010), Finnish Tatar photographer, entrepreneur
