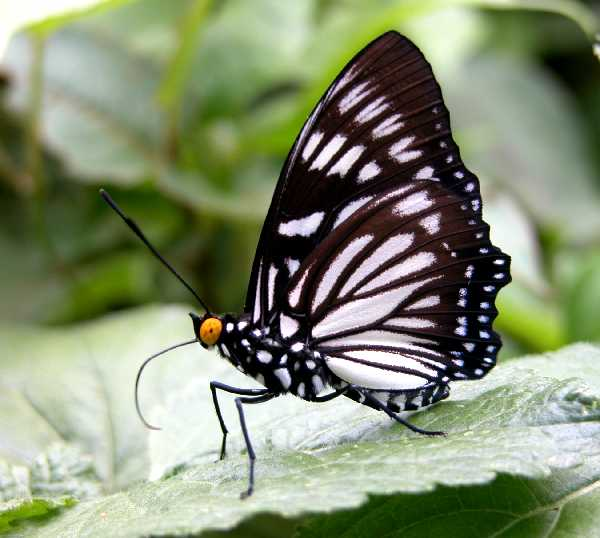
- female

Scientific classification
- Kingdom: Animalia
- Phylum: Arthropoda
- Clade: Pancrustacea
- Class: Insecta
- Order: Lepidoptera
- Family: Nymphalidae
- Genus: Euripus
- Species: E. consimilis

Binomial name
- Euripus consimilis (Westwood, 1850)

= Euripus consimilis =

Painted courtesan

Species of butterfly

Euripus consimilis, the painted courtesan, is a species of nymphalid butterfly found in India, Myanmar and Thailand.

== Description ==
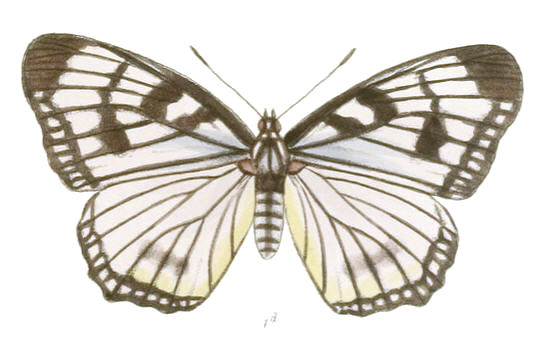

Male. Upperside: forewing black with the following white streaks and spots: a long streak from base, outwardly broadened and diffuse in interspace 1, a short slender streak in cell with a minute elongate spot below it, a broad, short, very oblique, in the middle broadly interrupted, median band, an oblique short row of slender paired streaks beyond in interspaces 3, 4 and 5, followed by a more complete postdiscal series of similar streaks from costa to interspace 2, and a terminal row of small dots turning into obscure streaks towards the apex. Hindwing white, traversed by the black veins, with the termen anteriorly narrowly, posteriorly broadly black, the broad portion traversed by a subterminal series of four or five crimson spots, and beyond by a terminal row of white spots. Underside similar; the markings broader, larger, and more clearly defined, the hindwing with a small patch and two spots of crimson at base. Antennae black; head, thorax and abdomen above black; the head and thorax beneath, the abdomen beneath and on the sides marked with white.

Female: Upperside: forewing similar, the white streaks much broader, single, not paired. Hindwing also similar, but the black on the terminal margin not at all or very slightly widened posteriorly, entirely without the crimson spots; there is instead a marked dilatation of the black bordering the veins 2, 3 and 4. Underside similar to the upperside.

Wingspan 70–88 mm.

== Distribution ==
The painted courtesan is found in southern and northeastern India, including the states of Sikkim, and Assam. Additionally, these butterflies are found in Tenasserim, Myanmar and Thailand.

== Gallery ==
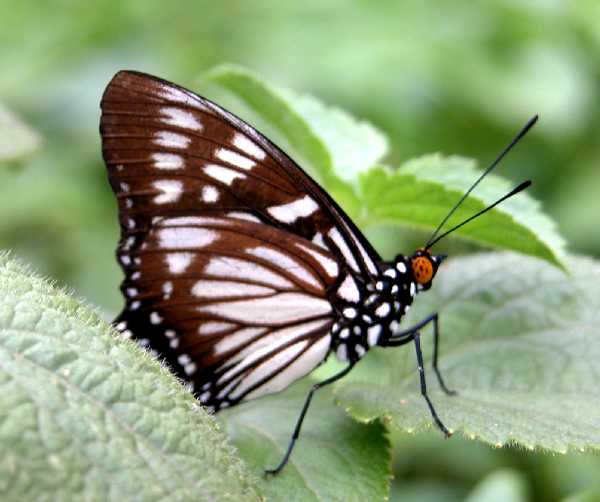

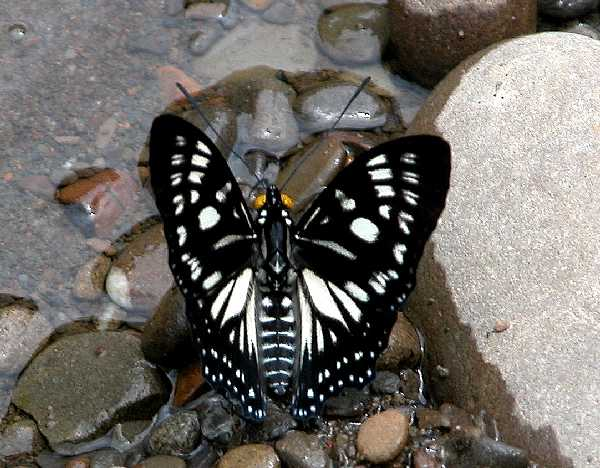

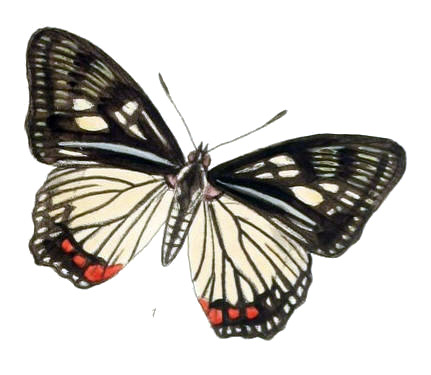
Male
