= On the Banks of the Wadi =

1898 painting by Nasreddine Dinet

Au bord de l'oued
- On the Banks of the Wadi (English)
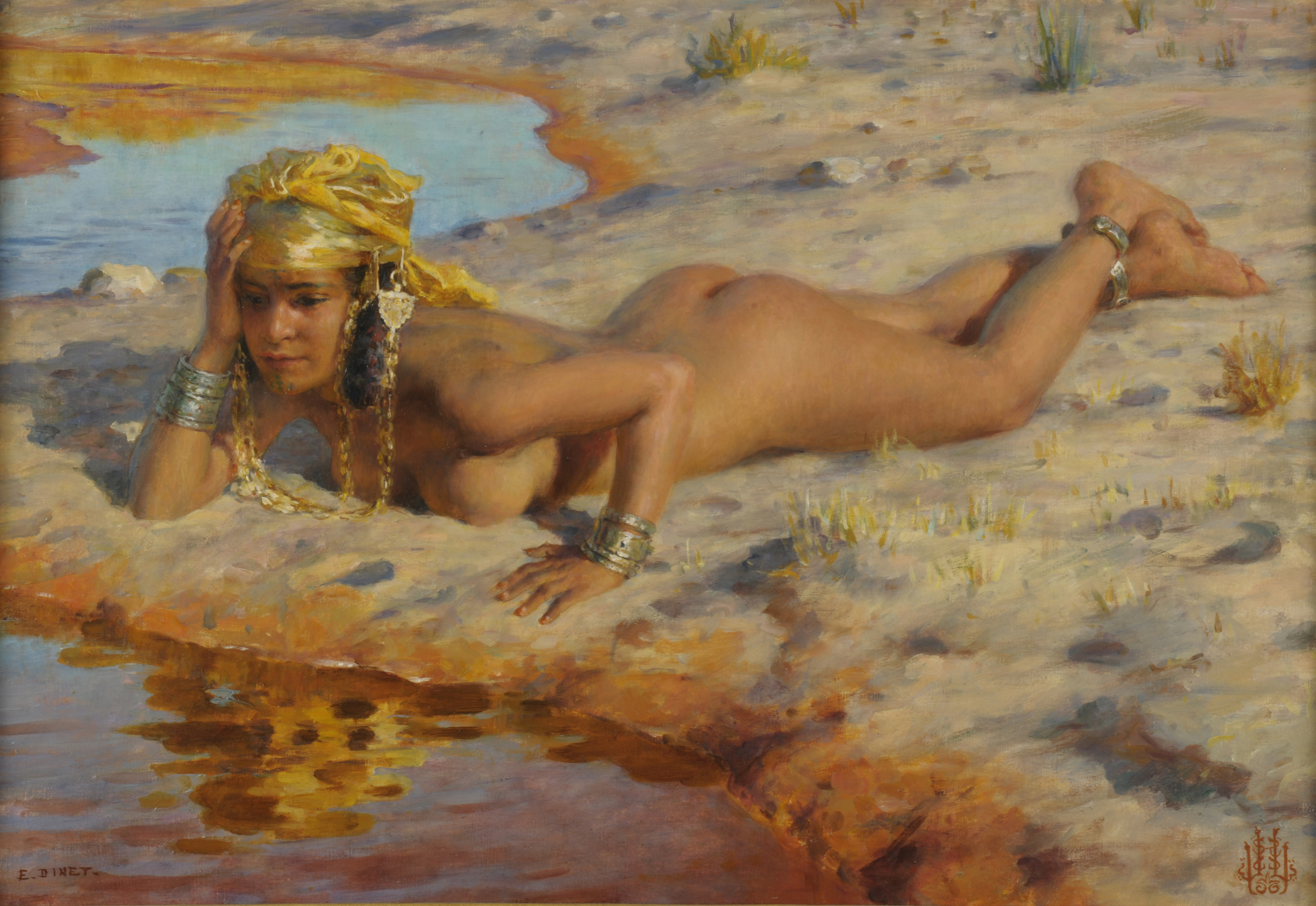
- Artist: Nasreddine Dinet
- Year: 1898
- Medium: Oil-on-canvas
- Dimensions: 49,8 cm × 73,5 cm (196 in × 289 in)
- Location: Museum of Fine Arts, Reims, Reims

On the Banks of the Wadi (French: Au bord de l'oued) is a genre painting created in 1898, by the French artist Nasreddine Dinet.

== Description ==
On the Banks of the Wadi is an oil painting created in Algeria by the painter Étienne Dinet. It has been kept at the Museum of Fine Arts in Reims since 1907, following its bequest to the city of Reims by Henry Vasnier. The latter had owned the painting since 1899.

In 2020, Valérie Susset of Le Républicain Lorrain observed that by taking the nude dancers of the Ouled Naïl tribe of Bou Saâda as his models, Nasreddine Dinet attracted as much criticism... as buyers! The models for the painter's nudes were generally prostitutes from the designated district, just as was the case for Eugène Delacroix and Gustave Achille Guillaumet; Nasreddine Dinet thus follows in the tradition of these painters.

In 2024, the painting is being presented among the works in the exhibition Nasreddine Dinet, Algerian Passions at the Institut du monde arabe.

== See also ==
- Orientalism
