= Nasir Uddin (anthropologist) =

Bangladeshi anthropologist

- Born: Cox's Bazar
- Other name: Rahman Nasir Uddin
- Occupation: Anthropologist

Nasir Uddin (Bengali: ড.নাসির উদ্দিন) is a cultural anthropologist, post-colonial theorist and prolific writer on topics ranging from human rights, Adivasi (indigenous people) issues, rights of non-citizens, refugees, and stateless people, common forms of discrimination, government in everyday life, media, democracy, and the state-society relations in Bangladesh and South Asia. Uddin is now widely known and globally acclaimed as a "Refugee and Migration Scholar". Uddin is a professor of anthropology at the University of Chittagong.

== Education ==
Uddin graduated with a BSS with honours in anthropology in 1997 and a master's degree in anthropology in 1998 from the University of Dhaka.

Later in his career, he studied at the Graduate School of Asian and African Area Studies as a Ph.D. in area studies with a major in cultural anthropology at Kyoto University in 2004. From November 2005 to April 2007, he carried out ethnographical fieldwork in the Chittagong Hill Tracts (CHT) toward writing his dissertation for his Ph.D. degree, which was eventually conferred in March 2008. The dissertation was about indigenous mobility, transitions in everyday life, politics of marginality, and engendering leadership among the marginalized Adivasis of the CHT. His dissertation was published as I ndigeneity, Marginality and the State in Bangaldesh: Homeless as Home by Routledge. Apart from his intensive works on ethnicity, indignity, marginality and the state, Uddin has been actively involved in doing ethnographic research on the Rohingya people living in the borderland of Bangladesh and Myanmar for more than two decades.

== Career ==
In January 2001, Uddin joined the Department of Anthropology of the University of Chittagong as a lecturer and was promoted to assistant professor in 2003. In 2004, he was awarded a Monbukagakusho Scholarship.

He was soon promoted to associate professor at the University of Chittagong in mid-year 2009. In the same year, Uddin was awarded a British Academy visiting Fellowship for postdoctoral level research at the University of Hull in the UK. During this time, Uddin carried out research in several university libraries in the UK, including the University of Cambridge, Durham University, University of Oxford, University College London (UCL), Londong School of Economics and Political Science (LSE), School of Oriental and African Studies (SOAS) and University of Manchester. Soon after finishing his project in the country, Uddin conducted advanced research on "The State of Ethnic Minority in the State-formation in Post-colonial State: Experience from Bangladesh" as an affiliate of the Department of Sociology at Delhi School of Economics The University of Delhi.

In 2012, Uddin was awarded an Alexander von Humboldt Foundation fellowship to do another postdoctoral research at the Ruhr-Universität Bochum in Germany. During this time, Uddin taught courses in the Faculty of Social Sciences (2012–2013) while researching the anthropology of the state. He also did research at Heidelberg University, Germany, and Vrije Universiteit Amsterdam, the Netherlands as a visiting fellow in 2013. Later Uddin joined the Department of Anthropology at the London School of Economics and Political Science (LSE) as a visiting Scholar to continue his research on indigeneity, state-making, and marginality in the context of Bangladesh and South Asia in January 2014. Then, Uddin joined the Refugee Studies Centre (RSC) at the University of Oxford as a visiting research fellow in 2018. At the same time, he worked as a Research Consultant at the School of Oriental and African Studies (SOAS), University of London. During his affiliation with Oxford University and SOAS, he worked on the ethnicity, identity, and representation of the Rohingya people. In addition, Uddin had been traveling across the world and giving lectures and presentations on his research on indigeneity, the state in everyday life, and refugee studies (particularly on the Rohingya people) regularly in many renowned universities of many countries, including the US, UK, Canada, Germany, France, the Netherlands, Japan, Australia, Indonesia, Malaysia, India and China.

After the emergency of COVID-19 was lifted from across the world, Uddin was awarded an Asia Studies Visiting Fellowship at The East-West Center, Washington DC in 2022. He then worked as a visiting scholar in the Department of Anthropology at Johns Hopkins University, USA. In mid-2023, Uddin took up a visiting professor position as a James Fellow in SSSHARC at The University of Sydney, Australia. Then he was awarded a distinguished visiting professorship at CSEAS, Kyoto University, Japan. In 2025, Uddin was awarded a Visiting Scholar at the Mittal Institute at Harvard University. Later in 2015, Uddin was appointed as a Visiting Professor in the Department of Anthropology at South Asia Institute, Heidelberg University. Bedies, Uddin worked as a Mittal Institute Associate at Harvard university for six months from October 2025 to March, 2026.

== Fields of research ==
His current fields of research include:

- Statelessness, (Non)Citizenship and Refugeehood
- Migration and Refugee Studies
- Ethnicity and the Formation of Ethnic Category in De-territorialised world
- Mobility and Transition in Identity and Cultural Entity
- Indigeneity, Identity-politics and Belongingness
- Subaltern Studies and the Politics of Marginality
- Dialectics between Colonialism and Post-colonialism
- Peace and Conflict Studies
- Notions of Power and State in Everyday Life
- Islam and Secularism
- Dynamics of Regionalism and Area Studies
- Paradox of Modernity and Globalization
- Interface of Local Wisdom and Global Doctrine

== Journal articles and books ==
Uddin has published numerous journal articles, edited volumes and written books on the Chittagong Hill Tracts, colonialism and post-colonialism, anthropology of the state, adivasi Issues, and Rohingya refugees issues among others. His recently edited books, Life in Peace and Conflict: Indigeneity and State in the Chittagong Hill Tracts (Delhi: Orient BlackSwan, 2017) and Indigeneity on the Move: Varying Manifestation of a Contested Concept (Oxford & New York: Berghahn, 2017) have earned tremendous international attention and recognition.

Uddin also edited a couple of widely known books including “Deterritorialised Identity and Transborder Movement in South Asia” (Springer, 2019 [co-edited with Nasreen Chowdhory]), “The Rohingya Crisis: Human Rights Issues, Policy Concerns and Burden Sharing” (SAGE, 2021), “Palgrave Handbook of Social Fieldwork” (Palgrave, 2023 (co-edited with Alak Paul), “Refugee and Media: Local and Global Perspective” (Palgrave MacMillan, 2024 [co-edited with Delaware Arif), "Reshaping Rohingya Futures: Coping Strategies and Emerging Agencies" (Palgrave MacMillan, 2025) and "Scattered Lives of 'Stateless' People: The Rohingyas in SAARC and AREAN Counties" (Springer, 2025).

His latest books include “The Rohingya: An Ethnography of ‘Subhuman’ Life” (The Oxford University Press, 2020), “Voices of the Rohingya People: A Case of Genocide, Ethnocide and ‘Subhuman’ Life” (Palgrave, 2022) and “Indigeneity, Marginality and the State: Homeless at Home” (Routledge, 2024). His book (The Rohingya: An Ethnography of ‘Subhuman’ Life) was short-listed as the best book in social sciences published in 2020-2021 & 2021-2022 by the International Convention of Asian Scholars (ICAS). Uddin's theory of “Subhuman” life is widely discussed in the area of scholarship on refugees, migration, non-citizens, asylum seekers, stateless people, IDPs, and forcibly displaced people.

== Theory of "Subhuman" ==
Uddin has been working for years to build a new theory of what is called "Subhuman" theory to understand the people living in acutely marginalized and atrocious conditions. 'Subhuman' is a theory to understand an acute vulnerable condition of the people and the nature of the state. It could also provide a new framework for understanding genocide, ethnocide, ethnic cleansing and domicide. Uddin argues that 'subhuman' is a category of people who are born in human society but have no space in the human community. 'Subhuman' does not receive treatments that a human deserves, and does not lead a life like a human being. 'Subhumans' are born in the world, but the world does not own them in any state-structure. 'Subhuman' are treated as like o-manush (non-human) since they do not exist in the legal framework of any state. 'Subhuman' is a particular category of people who live in the borderland of 'life' and 'death'. 'Subhumans' are not human in their due dignity, rights and voice as are dealt with as if less than human beings. Towards establishing his theory of "Subhuman", Uddin's monograph title The Rohingyas: A Case of "Subhuman" Life has been published by the Oxford University Press (2020) which contains the theory of 'subhuman' life with the reference of the Rohingya people living in the borderland of Bangladesh and Myanmar. His theory of "subhuman" is being widely spreading up across the world with huge appreciation. Recently, Uddin gave three consecutive talks on his theory of "Subhuman" at the Asia Institute at the University of Toronto, the International Migration Research Centre (IMRC) at Wilfrid Laurier University, Waterloo and Centre for Refugee Studies at York University. He also gave a lecture on his "subhuman theory" in the 8th Humboldt Foundation Winners Forum Meeting in Bonn, Germany on 18 October 2018. Uddin gave lectures on his "subhuman" theory at the Refugee Studies Centre (RSC) of Oxford University, Department of Anthropology and Sociology at SOAS and the Centre for Migration, Refugees, and Belonging at the University of East London (UEL) in November 2018. He recently was on a tour of a series of lectures at several universities in the USA where he gave lectures on his subhuman theory. The universities include Columbia University (on 10 October 2019), New York University(NYU) (on 11 October 2019), The New School for Social Research (on 16 October 2019), University of Delaware ( 17 & 18 October 2019) and Cornell University (on 21 October 2019). Uddin also gave a series of lectures in Australia including universities in Sydney, Melbourne and Adelaide in December 2019.

== Ethnography is a "joint product" ==
Uddin published an article titled "Decolonising Ethnography in the Field: An Anthropological Account" in the International Journal of Social Research Methodology where he articulated a theoretical proposition that ethnography is a "joint product". Uddin wrote, 'Colonialism does not end with the withdrawal of colony from occupied territories but it exists across time. There is a constant dialogue between colonial domination and post-colonial transformation both in principle and practice. Doing ethnographic fieldwork therefore involves justifiable positioning of a researcher in the interface between subjectivity and objectivity whilst ethnography itself is struggling with the question of representation in connection with the colonial tradition of imaging anthropological objects as 'uncivilised others'. There has been an overdue need for decolonising ethnography since Malinowski's field diary was published. However, an ethnographer still encounters colonial ideology in the field in making meaning of ethnographic data. How does an ethnographer encounter colonial inheritance in the field? How does s/he position herself/himself in the context of ethnographer's supremacy in object's world?'. All these questions could be answered if ethnography could become a "joint product" where the researcher and the people studied are equally reflected, represented with sensible position, and voiced reciprocally. Soon after the article was published, Uddin's theoretical proposition 'ethnography is a joint product' received wider academic attention in social sciences, particularly in anthropology across the world.

== Many faces of the state ==
Anthropology of the state has grown up as an emerging field of research in anthropology during the last three decades. In classical anthropology, political organisations and political systems in stateless societies constituted the major field of investigation, rather than the idea of the state. British social anthropology in particular paid attention to how political organizations and political systems used to function in African society without even the concept of what we now call the state. Since the late 1990s, anthropological understanding of the state has increasingly grown up under a specialized field of study providing perspectives from the margins of society. During the last three decades, anthropology of the state has come up with a very strong field of study where many scholars have contributed to building theories with their own ethnographic works from across the world. Uddin with his colleague Eva Gergarz has published an article titled "The Many Faces of the State: Living in Peace and Conflict in the Chittagong Hill Tracts, Bangladesh" in Conflict and Society: Advances in Research which has contributed a new theoretical framework to understand state from the margin phrasing "The Many Faces of the State". Uddin and Gerharz have argued that the state has many faces which become functional in dealing with the people who (re)define the many faces of the state amidst their everyday lived experience. Uddin and Gerhaz's theory is widely cited as the "state has many faces" in the anthropology of the state and the margins.

== Border is a Humanised Space ==
The classical notion of the border essentially denotes a state boundary as a spatial and territorial entity that connects and separates two states in terms of a physical lineup. The border has always been represented as a rigid, strict, patrolling, regimented, and policing as well as spaces of national security, human trafficking, illicit trade, transboundary militancy, and questions of sovereignty. Against this background, the theory redefines and retheorizes the border, proposing an alternative lens to see its humanitarian role in rescuing and saving lives in atrocious and deadly conditions. Theory argues that the border is not only a territorial and spatial entity with strict authority, power and force but also a “humanized space” for people in atrocious conditions. See for detail: “The Border as a Humanized Space: (Un)making Territoriality and Spatiality of State Boundary” (Francis & Taylor, UK & USA).
