= Elisabeth Adele Allram-Lechner =

Czech stage actress

Elisabeth Adele Allram-Lechner (1824-1861) was an actress. She was engaged at the Estates Theatre in Prague from 1846 to 1861, where she belonged to the theatre's star attractions. She was known for her heroine roles.
