= Najla' Jalal Al Sayyed Allam =

Egyptian writer and researcher

- Occupation: writer

Najla' Jalal Al Sayyed Allam (Arabic: نجلاء جلال السيد علام) is an Egyptian writer and researcher, editor-in-chief of "Qatr al-Nada Magazine" since 2018. She is a member of Egyptian Writers Union, The General Union of Arab Writers and Cairo Atelier.

Najla' Allam held several positions, including Director-General for Children's Culture in the Ministry of Culture, and rapporteur of the Child Culture Committee in Supreme Council of Culture. She is the supervisor of the Children's Literature Clubs of The General Organization of Culture Palaces. She has many novels, books and story collections, including "Speaking of the Heart", "Luminous wishes", "Qatr al-Nada", "The Prince of Stories", "A Hovering Spirit Coming", "Half Eye", and "Little Elephants Have Not Died Yet!»

== Education ==
She obtained a diploma in strategic planning in 2013 from Educational institution in Egypt, a diploma in theater studies in 1994 from Ain Shams University in Egypt, and a bachelor's degree in commerce in 1991 from the same university.

== Books ==
- "Little Elephants Have Not Died Yet!", (Arabic: 'afyal saghira lam tamut baed) a collection of short stories, The General Egyptian Book Organization, in 1996.
- "Half Eye" (Arabic: Niṣf ʻayn), a novel, The General Egyptian Book Organization in 2000.
- "A Hovering Spirit Coming" (Arabic: ruh tuhawwm atyta) a collection of short stories, the General Egyptian Book Organization, in 2004.
- "The Development of Children’s Magazines in Egypt and the Arab World" (Arabic: tatawur majalaat al'atfal fi misr walealam alearabii)The General Egyptian Book Organization in 2006.
- "The Prince of Stories" (Arabic: 'amir alhawadit), Stories for Children, The General Organization of Culture Palaces, in 2007.
- "The Mother's Touch" (Arabic: lamsat al'umi), a children's novel, El Dar El Arabeya For Book, in 2012.
- "Jameela's Eyes" (Arabic: Oyoun Jamilah) Children's Stories, Al-Dar Al- Masriah Al-Lubnaniah, 2012, Sheikh Zayed Book Award longlist in Children’s Literature.
- "Qatr al-Nada" (Arabic: qatar alnadaa), in 2012.
- "Luminous wishes" (Arabic: al'umniaat almudiya), in 2013.
- "Going Out to the Day" (Arabic: alkhuruj 'iilaa alnahar) is a novel, Dar Al-Adham for Distribution and Publishing, with a grant from Al-Mawred Al-Thaqafi Foundation, first edition in 2013.
- "We have a secret.. a big secret" (Arabic: baynana sirun .. sirun kabir) a collection of short stories for children, from 4 to 7 years old, The General Egyptian Book Organization, in 2016.
- "Speaking of the Heart" (Arabic: sirat alqalb), a collection of short stories, Badael Publishing House, in 2018.
- "My Doll" (Arabic: earusati) is a children’s novel, Sanabel series, The General Egyptian Book Organization, in 2019.
- "With My Father" (Arabic: eind 'abi) is a children’s story, Shagara Publishing House, in 2019.
- "Miss Possible" (Arabic: alansat mumkin) is a children's story, Badael Publishing House, in 2020.
- "The Secret of Happiness City" (Arabic: sir madinat alsaeada), a children's play, The General Egyptian Book Organization, in 2020.
- "The Gifted Child's Guide to the Arts of Writing" (Arabic: dalil altifl almawhub 'iilaa funun alkitaba) Study, The National Center for Child Culture, in 2021.
- "Like My Voice" (Arabic: mithl sawti), a children's story, Badael Publishing House, in 2021.
- "Toyo's Song" (Arabic: 'ughniat tuyu), a story for children, Future e-learning and printed, in 2021.
