= Abdel-Raof el-Reedy =

Egyptian writer and diplomat (born 1933)

Abdel-Raof al-Reedy
- Born: 1933 (age 91–92); Damietta, Egypt

Abdel-Raof el-Reedy (born 1933) is an Egyptian writer and diplomat, born in 1933 in Damietta Governorate, Egypt.

== Career ==
- He was a member of the delegation led by the president Gamal Abdel Nasser at the first summit of the non-aligned countries held at Belgrade.
- He was also a member of the Egyptian delegation that attended the tripartite meeting that included the president Abdel Nasser, president Josip Broz Tito of Yugoslavia and the Indian prime minister Indira Gandhi in New Delhi November 1966.
- He was a member of the Egyptian delegation at the Camp David conference headed by the President Anwar Sadat in August–September 1978.
- In 1954 he obtained a law degree. He also got a master's degree from the University of Colombia in Peaceful Uses of Outer Space.
- He was one of the founders of the Egyptian Public Library and chaired its board of directors since its opening in 1995.
- In 1955 he worked in the Ministry of Foreign Affairs.
- He was appointed as an attaché in the Egyptian mission to the United States.
- He worked in the management of the International board.
- He worked as a director of the Department of research and policy planning at the ministry of foreign affairs.
- He was appointed as Egypt's delegate to the United States in Geneva.
- He worked as Egypt's ambassador in Pakistan in 1979 .
- He worked as general Secretariat of the Arab league.
- He was as the Advisor to the Egyptian Mission to the United States.
- He was the director of the international organizations department in 1983.
- He worked as Egypt's Ambassador in the United States from 1984 to 1992.

He was honoured on his 90th birthday by the Minister of Culture for his long career, as well as his role in enriching Egyptian cultural life.

== Works ==
- The journey of life (original title: Rehlat al-Omr)
- Egypt and America (original title: Misr wa Amreeca)
- The battles of war and peace (original title: Ma’arek al-Harb was al-Salam)
