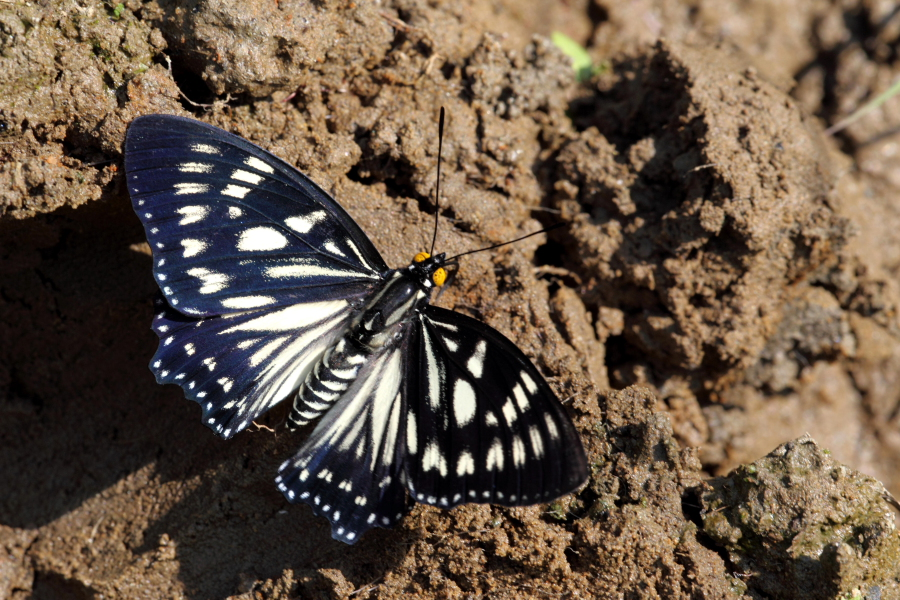

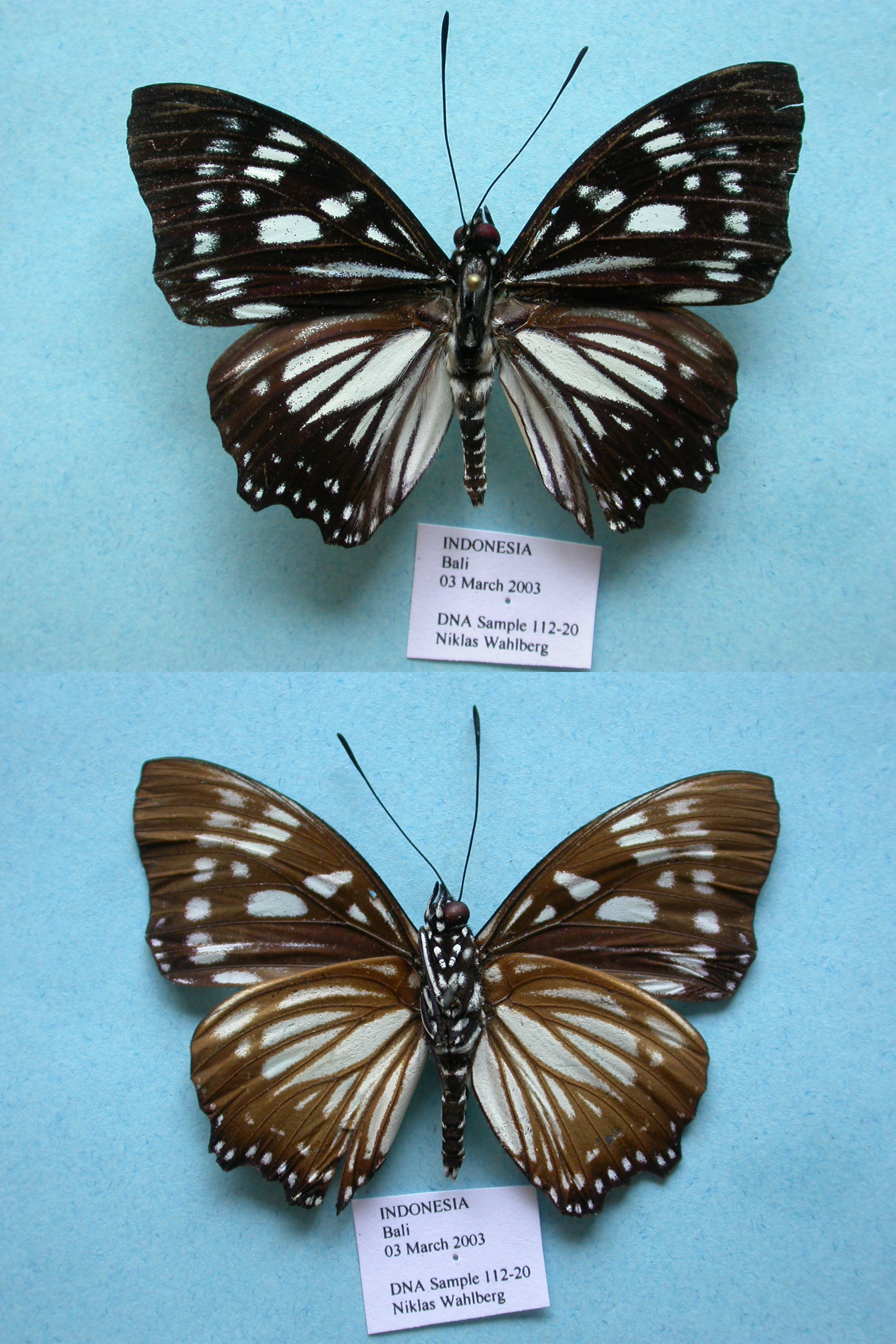

Scientific classification
- Kingdom: Animalia
- Phylum: Arthropoda
- Clade: Pancrustacea
- Class: Insecta
- Order: Lepidoptera
- Family: Nymphalidae
- Genus: Euripus
- Species: E. nyctelius

Binomial name
- Euripus nyctelius (Doubleday, 1845)

= Euripus nyctelius =

Species of butterfly

Euripus nyctelius, the courtesan, is an Indomalayan butterfly of the family Nymphalidae. It was first described by Henry Doubleday in 1845. The females mimic Euploea species. The larva feeds on Trema orientalis.

== Subspecies ==
- E. n. nyctelius Sikkim, Assam, Myanmar, northern Thailand
- E. n. mastor Fruhstorfer, 1903 Mainland Southeast Asia
- E. n. euploeoides C. & R. Felder, [1867] Peninsular Malaya, southern Thailand, Singapore, Langkawi, Sumatra, southern Yunnan
- E. n. niasicus Fruhstorfer, 1899 Nias
- E. n. javanus Fruhstorfer, 1899 Java
- E. n. borneensis Distant & Pryer, 1887 Borneo
- E. n. palawanicus Fruhstorfer, 1899 Palawan (Philippines)
- E. n. clytia C. & R. Felder, [1867] Luzon (Philippines)
- E. n. orestheion Fruhstorfer, 1914 Mindoro (Philippines)
- E. n. nysia Semper, 1887 Bohol, Mindanao (Philippines)
- E. n. sumatrensis Fruhstorfer, 1914 Sumatra
- E. n. ophelion Fruhstorfer, 1914 Bangka
