= Josef Allram =

Austrian poet and teacher (1860–1941)

Josef Allram (22 November 1860 in Schrems – 29 December 1941 in Mödling) was an Austrian writer and teacher. He studied education sciences.

== Works ==
- Waldviertler Geschichten, 1900
- Der 1000. Patient, 1903
- Hamerling und seine Heimat, 1905
- Der letzte Trieb, 1911

== External links and references ==
- "Allram Josef". In: Österreichisches Biographisches Lexikon 1815–1950 (ÖBL). Vol. 1, Austrian Academy of Sciences, Vienna 1957, p. 15.
- Josef Allram in Austria-Forum (in German) (at AEIOU)
- Josef Allram in the German National Library catalogue
- https://web.archive.org/web/20140504015552/http://www.waldviertlersepp.at/geschichte/geschichte-waldv-sepp.html
