= Schrems, Lower Austria =

Schrems
- Municipality
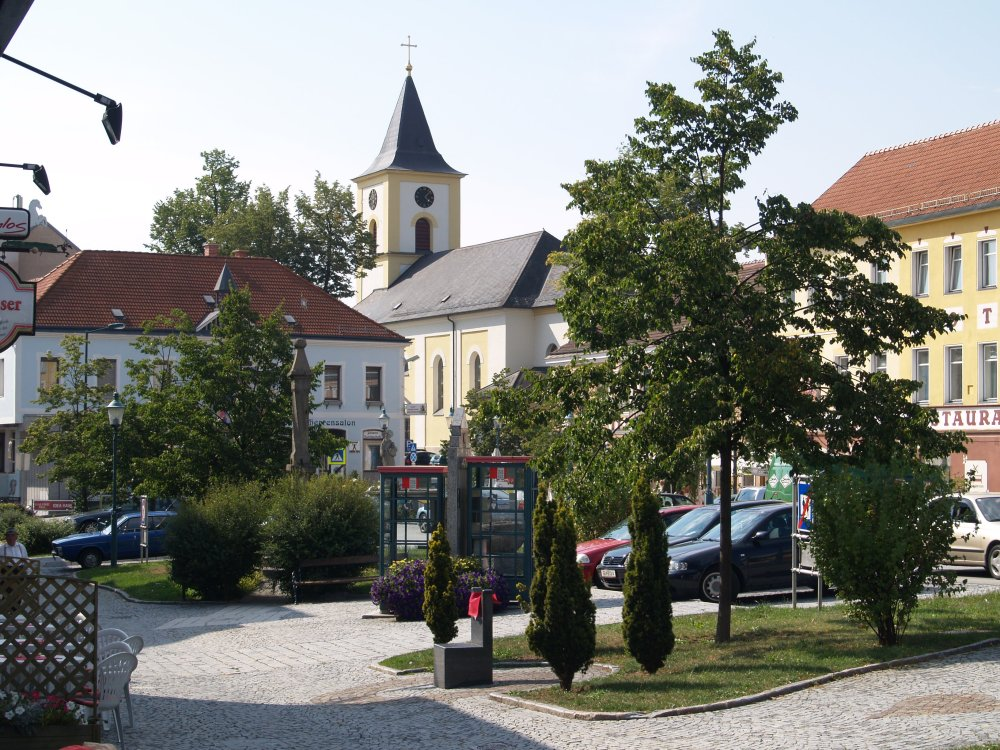
- Town square

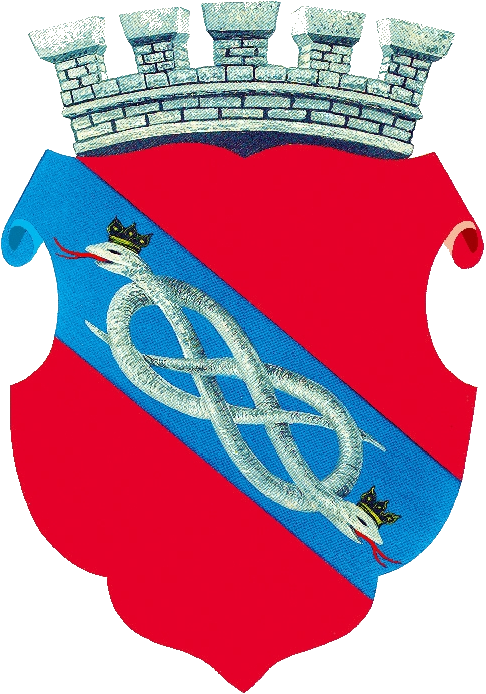
- Coat of arms

- Location within Austria Schrems (Austria)
- Coordinates: 48°47′N 15°4′E
- Country: Austria
- State: Lower Austria
- District: Gmünd

Government
  - Mayor: Karl Harrer (SPÖ)

Area
  - Total: 60.84 km^{2} (23.49 sq mi)
- Elevation: 532 m (1,745 ft)

Population (2018-01-01)
  - Total: 5,404
  - Density: 88.82/km^{2} (230.1/sq mi)
- Time zone: UTC+1 (CET)
  - Summer (DST): UTC+2 (CEST)
- Postal code: 3943
- Area code: 02853
- Website: www.schrems.gv.at

Schrems (German pronunciation: [ʃʁɛms]) is a town in the district of Gmünd in Lower Austria, Austria.

== Notable people ==
- Josef Allram (1860–1941), writer and teacher
