= The Courtesan =

1896 painting by Nasreddine Dinet

La Courtisane
- The Courtesan (English)
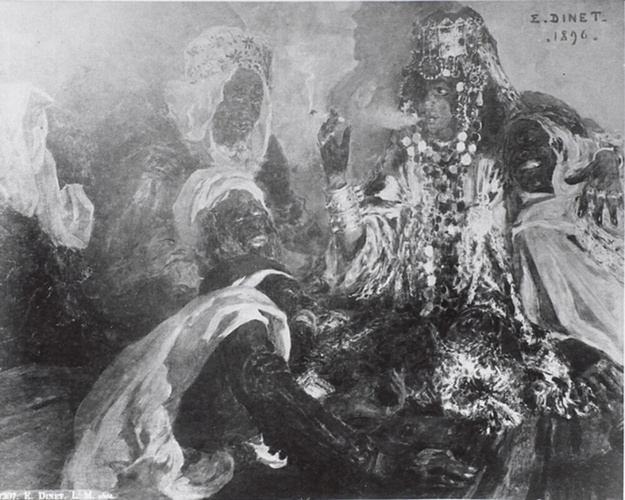
- Artist: Nasreddine Dinet
- Year: 1896
- Medium: Oil-on-canvas
- Dimensions: 120 cm × 145 cm (47 in × 57 in)
- Location: Musée d'Orsay, Paris

The Courtesan (French: La Courtisane) is a 1896 genre painting by the French artist Nasreddine Dinet.

== Description ==
The Courtesan is an oil painting by Nasreddine Dinet, created in 1896, depicting an Algerian courtesan smoking while surrounded by men pressing upon her with their desire. It is housed at the Musée d'Orsay in Paris.

The painting is signed and dated at the top right: "E. DINET 1896". The Courtesan was purchased by the French Third Republic for 3,000 francs at the 1897 Salon des Artistes Français.

The painting was featured in several exhibitions: the Salon and exhibition of the Société Nationale des Beaux-Arts in 1897, the exhibition of the Société Coloniale des Artistes Français in 1921, the exhibition marking the centenary of the conquest of Algeria in 1930, and the Nasreddine Dinet retrospective in 1931. This final exhibition is presided over by President Paul Doumer himself; it is intended to highlight Nasreddine Dinet as a key figure in the ties between France and Islam.

The drawings Head of an Arab Man and Head of a Young Arab Woman are preparatory studies for the painting The Courtesan ·.

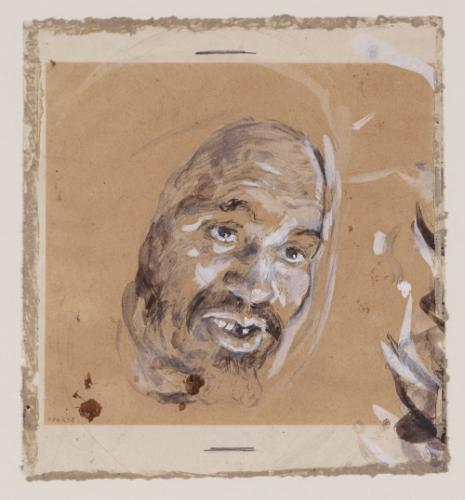
Tête d'arabe, preparatory drawing.

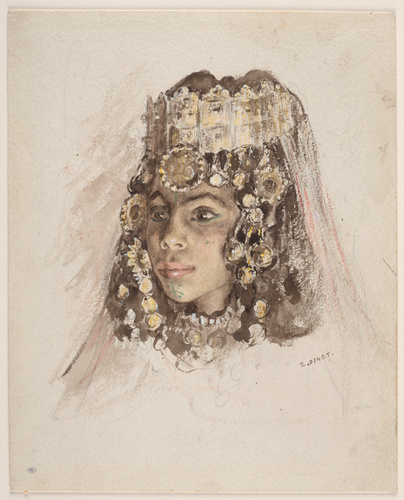
Tête de jeune femme arabe, preparatory drawing.

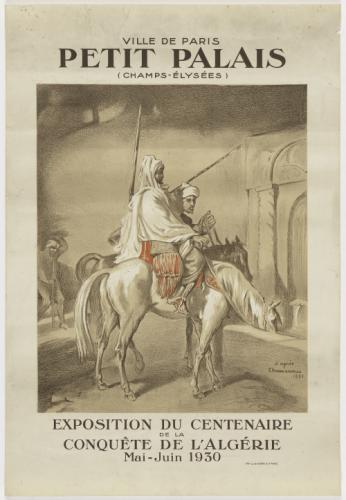
Exhibition marking the centenary of the conquest of Algeria in 1930.

== See also ==
- Orientalism
- Prostitution in Algeria
