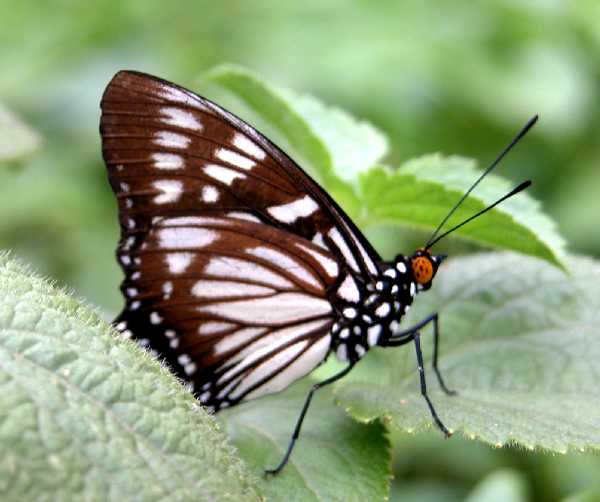

Scientific classification
- Kingdom: Animalia
- Phylum: Arthropoda
- Clade: Pancrustacea
- Class: Insecta
- Order: Lepidoptera
- Family: Nymphalidae
- Subfamily: Apaturinae
- Genus: Euripus; Doubleday, 1848

= Euripus (butterfly) =

Genus of brush-footed butterflies

Euripus is a genus of butterflies in the family Nymphalidae. The three species in the genus are native to South and Southeast Asia.

== Species ==
- Euripus consimilis (Westwood, 1850) – painted courtesan
- Euripus nyctelius (Doubleday, 1845) – courtesan
- Euripus robustus Wallace, 1869 – Wallace's courtesan
