= Mohamed Nasr Eldin Allam =

Egyptian politician and engineer

Mohamed Nasr Eldin Allam (Arabic: محمد نصر الدين علام) was appointed as Egyptian Minister of Irrigation and Water Resources by President Mohammed Hosni Mubarak on 11 March 2009, replacing Mahmoud Abu Zeid.

He was previously Professor of Irrigation and Drainage Engineering in the Cairo University Faculty of Engineering, and was founder and general manager of Nile Consultants, an engineering consulting firm in Cairo.

== Qualifications ==
- B.Sc. (1975) "Civil Engineering" Cairo University (Egypt)
- M.Sc. (1980) "Irrigated agricultural expansion planning in developing countries" Massachusetts Institute of Technology, Cambridge (USA)
- Ph.D. (1982) "Irrigated agricultural expansion: investment scheduling, income redistribution & resilient system design" Massachusetts Institute of Technology, Cambridge (USA)
