= Hassan Allam =

Egyptian businessman

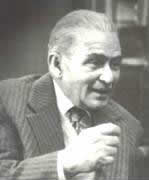
Hassan Allam

Hassan Mohammed Allam (1903 – 3 January 1976) was one of the pioneers of modern construction in Egypt.

== Early life and career ==
Hassan Allam was born in Port Said and subsequently moved to the Upper Egyptian town of Al Minya with his family. His father owned a small shop that sold construction materials including tiles and ceramics imported from Great Britain. Allam attended primary school but did not continue his education, joining his father's business instead.

In 1924 at the age of 19, he immigrated to Cairo where he formed a small informal contracting outfit. In 1936, he founded Hassan Mohammed Allam & Co. for General Contracting - a limited partnership company. Despite having received no formal education in the field of construction, his managerial and technical expertise were substantial. He was also widely popular with construction labourers and engineers.

== First major contracts ==
In 1938, King Farouk was on his way to Ismalia when he was injured in a car accident and was whisked to the nearby village of Kassassin to be treated in a small medical facility. As a result of the incident, the King ordered that a hospital be built in the area. Hassan Allam thus landed his first major contract and El Kassaseen Hospital was built on the Cairo-to-Ismaïlia agricultural road. Other early contracts included the Mebara hospital in Port Said, a power station in Damanhur, and the first Egyptian oil refinery in Suez. His firm was beginning to seriously compete with El Abd Pasha, Ahmad Bakir (a road contractor) and Ali Ibrahim Pasha (whose work include the Television Building and the Tahrir Office Complex in Cairo). Eventually the company became one of the largest in the construction field in the country together with Osman Ahmed Osman's Arab Contractors Co.

== An unknowing early supporter of Anwar el-Sadat ==
Allam unknowingly protected Anwar el-Sadat in his early years. In the 1940s, Sadat in an effort to evade political persecution, disguised himself as a truck driver and took a job in Hassan Allam's company. Sadat later became the third president of Egypt.

== Adjusting to political change over the years ==
After the 1952 revolution, the company continued to thrive and executed a number of major roads such as the Ismalia-Al 'Arish, Suez-Marsa Alam, and Alexandria-Marsa Matruh highways. Many projects were also completed in Port Said that included a large cathedral and a mosque. Prior to the construction of the Aswan High Dam, the company was in charge of building a new community for the Nubian people whose villages lay in the area that was later to become Lake Nasser.

In 1961, the company was nationalized under President Gamal Abdel Nasser’s new socialist policies to become Nasr General Contracting - Hassan Mohammed Allam with Hassan Allam losing ownership and becoming its general manager.

In 1975, taking advantage of the Infitah or open-door policies adopted by President Anwar el-Sadat’s government, he established his second company - Hassan Allam Sons. Shortly after, the new company submitted a bid for building a large sewage network in Mecca, Saudi Arabia. However Hassan Allam did not live to see the result of the bid. His funeral was held at the Omar Makram Mosque in Tahrir Square and was attended by thousands of mourners. The crowd extended from the mosque almost up to the Ramesses Hilton.

There are currently two streets named after Hassan Allam; one in the Heliopolis district and the other in Downtown Cairo.
