= Nasir al-Din (disambiguation) =

Nasir al-Din (Arabic: نصیر الدین or ناصرالدین or نصر الدين, 'Defender of the Faith') was an honorific title, and is an Arabic masculine given name.

Nasir al-Din or variant spellings may also refer to:

- Nasir ad-Din, Palestine, a former Palestinian Arab village
- Nasr ol Din, a village in South Khorasan Province, Iran
- Nasireddin (crater), on the Moon
- Nasreddin (crater), on Pluto's moon Charon
- Nasirdîn, a Yazidi holy figure

== See also ==
- ad-Din, a suffix component of some Arabic names
- Molla Nasraddin, an early 20th century Azerbaijani satirical periodical
- Nasreddin in Bukhara, a 1943 Soviet comedy film
- Nasrettinhoca, a town in Eskişehir Province, Turkey
