= Nasreddine Dinet =

French painter

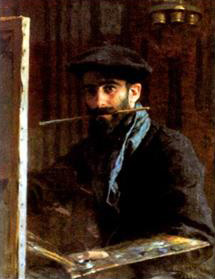
- Nasreddine Dinet, Self Portrait (1891), Musée Nasreddine Dinet à Bou-Sâada
- Born: Alphonse-Étienne Dinet; 28 March 1861; Paris, France
- Died: 24 December 1929 (aged 68); Paris, France
- Education: Lycée Henry IV; Académie Julian; École nationale supérieure des Beaux-Arts
- Known for: painting, translating Arabic literature
- Movement: Orientalist themes

Nasreddine Dinet (born as Alphonse-Étienne Dinet on 28 March 1861 – 24 December 1929, Paris) was a French orientalist painter and was one of the founders of the Société des Peintres Orientalistes Society for French Orientalist Painters. He became so enchanted with Algeria and its culture, that he converted to Islam, and was proficient in Arabic. In addition to his paintings, he translated Arabic literature into French. After converting to Islam, he chose the name Nasr ad-Din, which means "defender of the Dīn".

== Biography ==
Born in Paris, Alphonse-Étienne Dinet, was the son of a prominent French judge, Philippe Léon Dinet and Marie Odile Boucher. In 1865 his sister Jeanne, who would be his biographer, was born.

From 1871, he studied at the Lycée Henry IV, where the future president Alexandre Millerand was also among the students. Upon graduation in 1881 he enrolled in the École nationale supérieure des Beaux-Arts and entered the studio of Victor Galland. The following year he studied under William Bouguereau and Tony Robert-Fleury at the Académie Julian. He also exhibited for the first time at the Salon des artistes français.

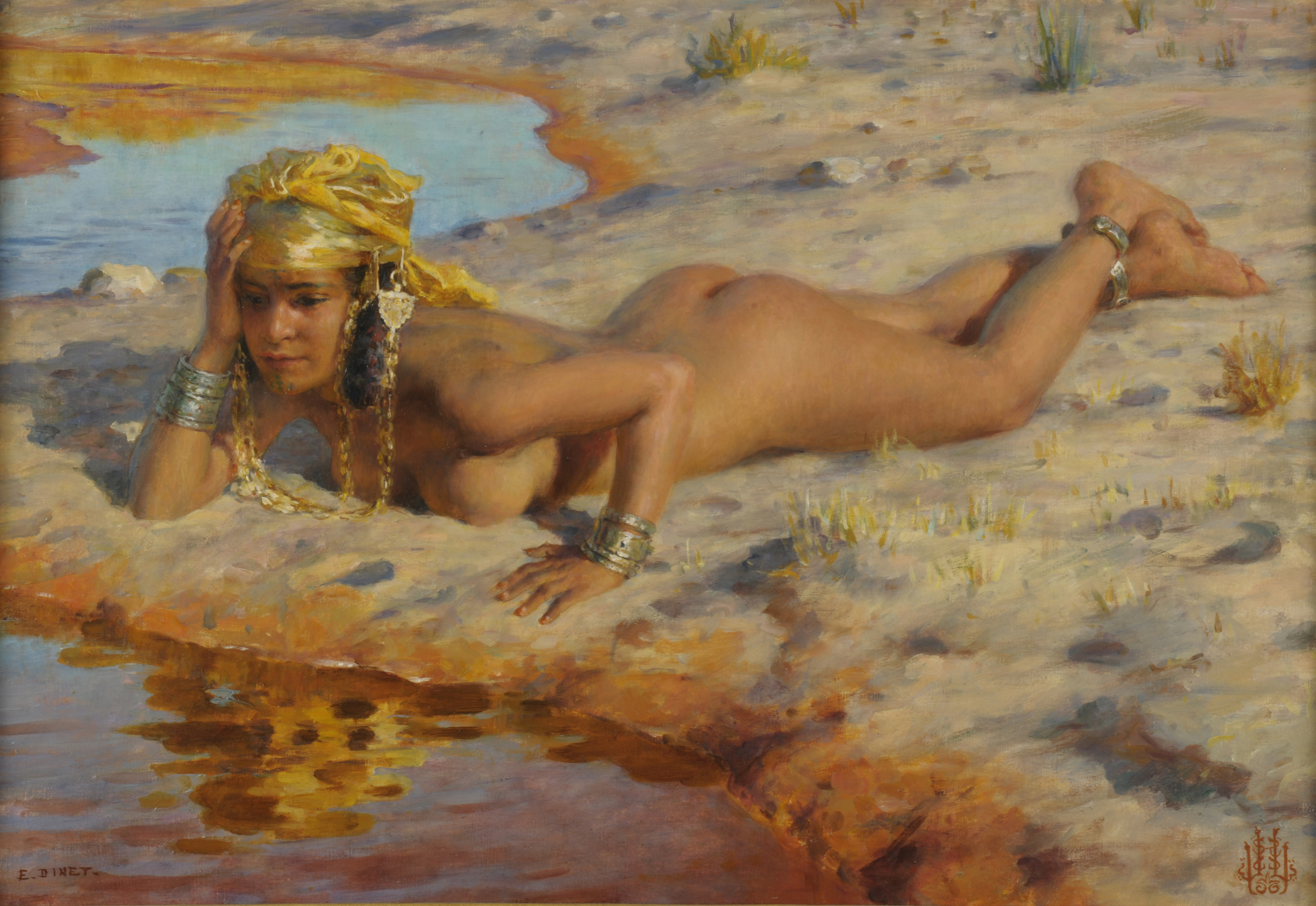
On the Banks of the Wadi (1898).

Dinet made his first trip to Bou Saâda by the Ouled Naïl Range in northern Algeria in 1884, with a team of entomologists. The following year he made a second trip on a government scholarship, this time to Laghouat. At that time he painted his first two Algerian pictures: les Terrasses de Laghouat and l’Oued M’Sila après l’orage.

He won the silver medal for painting at the Exposition Universelle in 1889, and in the same year founded the Société Nationale des Beaux-Arts along with Meissonier, Puvis de Chavannes, Rodin, Carolus-Duran and Charles Cottet. In 1887 he further founded with Léonce Bénédite, director of the Musée du Luxembourg, the Société des Peintres Orientalistes Français.

In 1903 he bought a house in Bou Saâda and spent three quarters of each year there. Dinet became so enchanted with North Africa and its culture, that he eventually converted to Islam. He announced his conversion to Islam in a private letter of 1908, and completed his formal conversion in 1913 in Zawiyet El Hamel, upon which he changed his name to Nasr’Eddine Dinet. In 1929 he and his wife undertook the Hajj to Mecca. In July 1896, he was named Chevalier of the Legion of Honour and participated in the international exhibition of the Centenary of Lithography (Paris). The respect he earned from the natives of Algeria was reflected by the 5,000 who attended his funeral on 12 January 1930 in Bou Saâda. There he was eulogized by the former Governor General of Algeria Maurice Viollette.

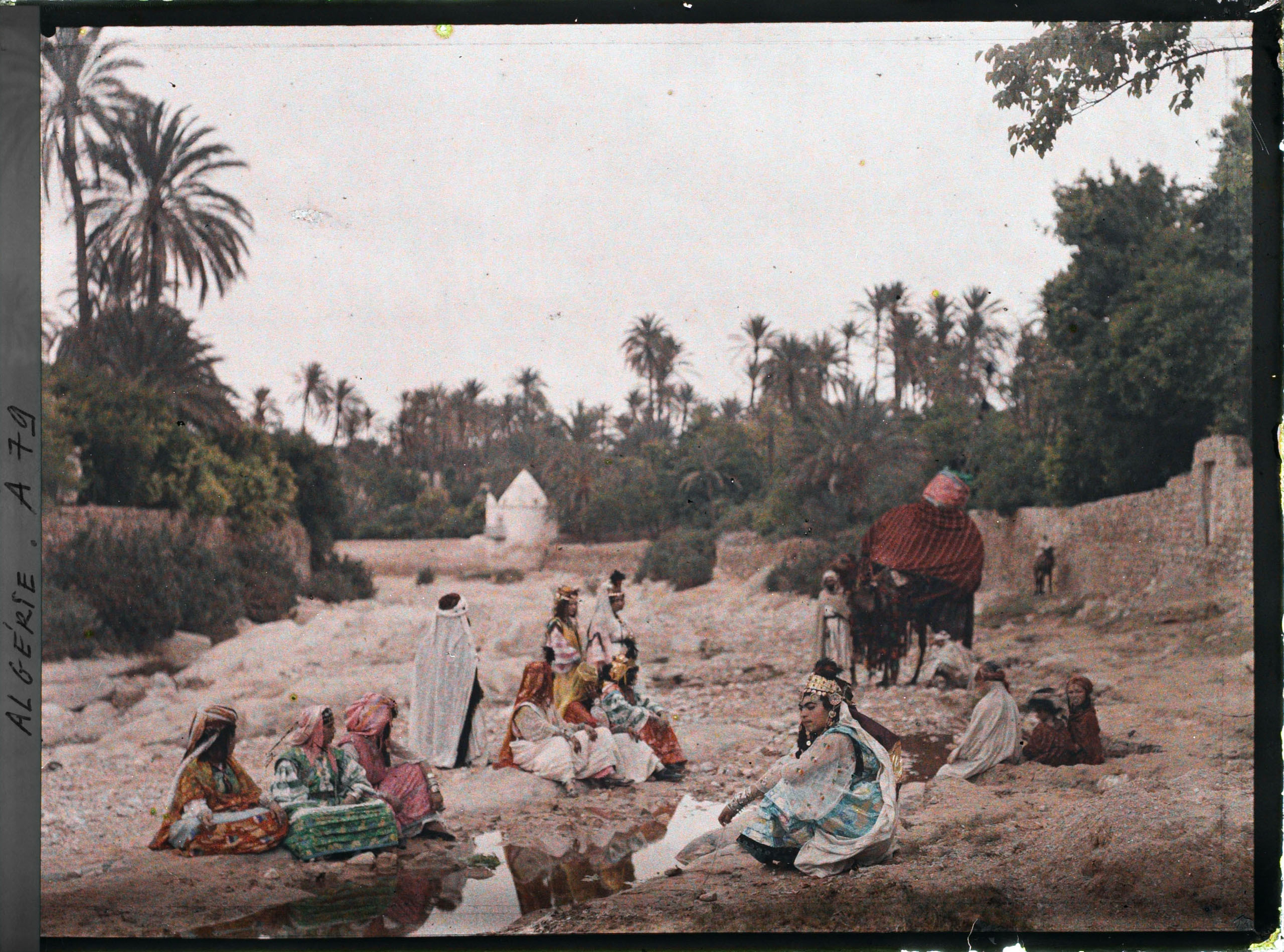
Ouled Naïl near Dinet's pavilion, Musée Albert-Kahn (c. 1910).

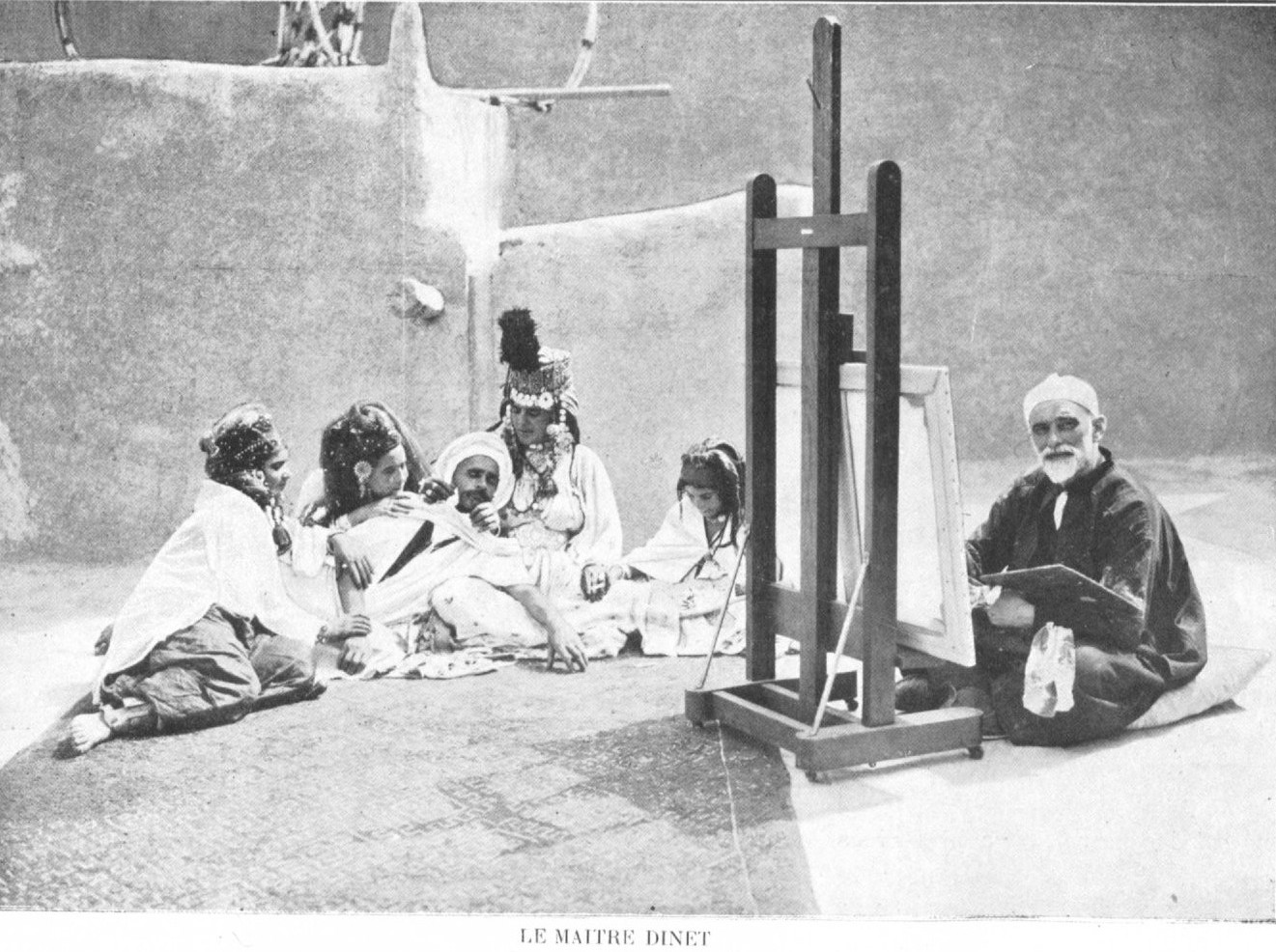
Étienne Dinet with his models (1923).

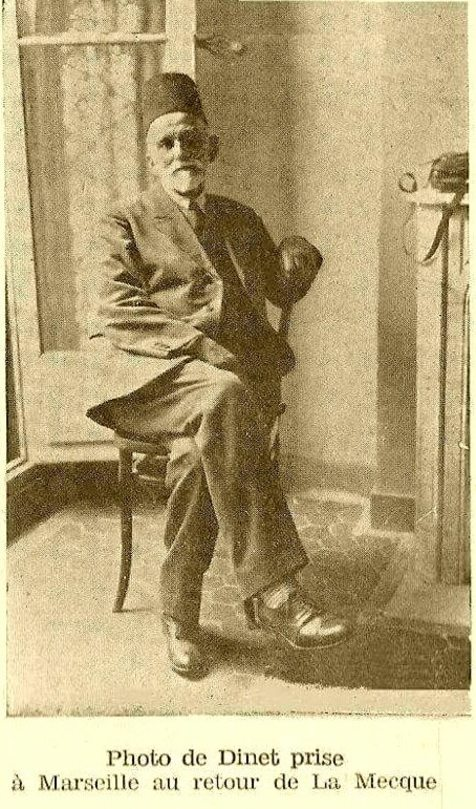
Return from Mecca (1929).

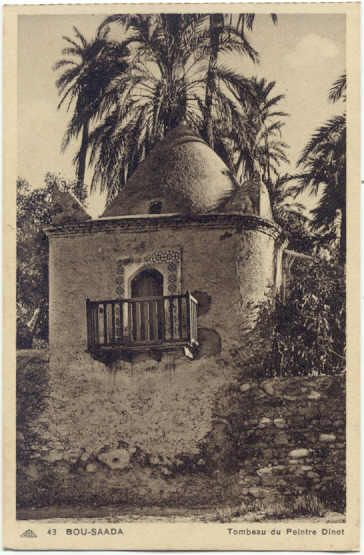
Mausoleum in Bou Saâda, wadi-facing façade.

== Work ==
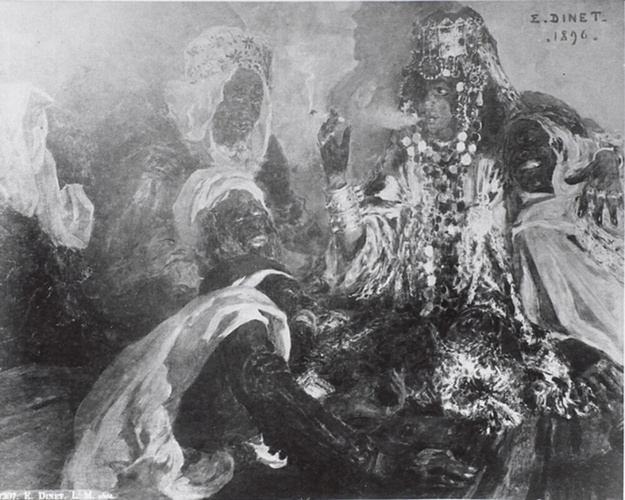
The Courtesan by Nasreddine Dinet (1896).

Compared to modernist painters such as Henri Matisse, who also visited northern Africa in the first decade of the 20th century, Dinet's paintings are extremely conservative. They are highly mimetic, indeed ethnographic, in their treatment of their subject.

Dinet's understanding of Arab culture and language set him apart from other orientalist artists because as an Arabic speaking visitor, he was able to find nude models in rural Algeria where the 'rule of the veil' was less frequently observed. Before 1900, most of his works could be characterized as "anecdotal genre scenes". As he became more interested in Islam, he began to paint religious subjects more often. He was active in translating Arabic literature into French, publishing a translation of an Arab epic poem by Antarah ibn Shaddad in 1898.

== Legacy ==
His life and work have been subject of several books, namely:

- Denise Brahimi and Koudir Benchikou, La Vie et l'oeuvre d' Etienne Dinet, [volume 2 in the series, Les Orientalistes], Paris, ACR edition, 1984 (Dinet’s Catalogue raisonné)
- J. M. Blades (ed.), The Art of Etienne Dinet, Shafik Gabr Collection, 2018

== See also ==
- List of Orientalist artists
- Orientalism
- Ouled Naïl
- Société des Peintres Orientalistes Français
