= Zamacois =

Zamacois is a surname of French Basque origins. (In Basque, with the current spelling, it is written: Zamakoitz).

== People with this surname ==
- Eduardo Zamacois y Zabala (1841–1871), Spanish painter
- Eduardo Zamacois (1873–1971), Cuban-Spanish novelist and journalist
- Elisa Zamacois (1838–1915), Spanish singer and actress
- Gloria Zamacois (1897–1946), Spanish short story writer
- Joaquín Zamacois (1894–1976), Spanish composer
- Miguel Zamacoïs (1866–1955), French writer
- Niceto de Zamacois (1820–1885), Spanish writer and historian
- Ricardo Zamacois (1847–1888), Spanish actor and singer
