= Julius LeBlanc Stewart =

American painter (1855–1919)

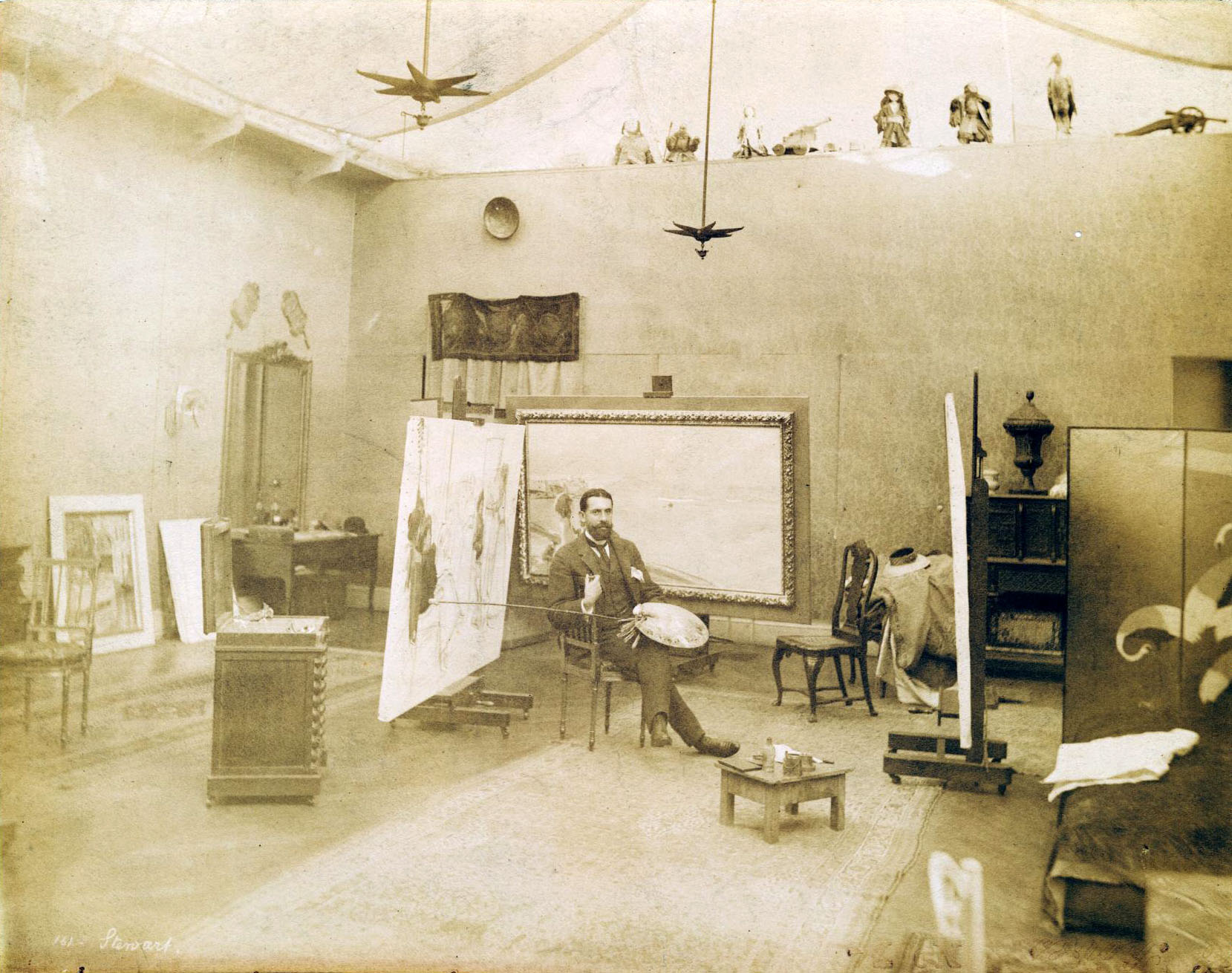
- Julius Leblanc Stewart in his Paris studio
- Born: September 6, 1855; Philadelphia, Pennsylvania
- Died: January 4, 1919 (aged 63); Paris, France
- Education: Eduardo Zamacois; Jean-Léon Gérôme; École des Beaux-Arts; Raymondo de Madrazo
- Known for: Painter
- Style: Barbizon school
- Movement: Orientalist

Julius LeBlanc Stewart (September 6, 1855, Philadelphia, Pennsylvania — January 4, 1919, Paris, France), was an American artist who spent his career in Paris. A contemporary of fellow expatriate painter John Singer Sargent, Stewart was nicknamed "the Parisian from Philadelphia".

== Biography ==
His father, the sugar millionaire William Hood Stewart, moved the family from Philadelphia, Pennsylvania to Paris in 1865, and became a distinguished art collector and an early patron of Marià Fortuny and the Barbizon artists. Julius studied under Eduardo Zamacois as a teenager, under Jean-Léon Gérôme at the École des Beaux-Arts, and later was a pupil of Raymondo de Madrazo.

Stewart's family wealth enabled him to live a lush expatriate life and paint what he pleased, often large-scaled group portraits. The first of these, After the Wedding (Drexel University Art Collection, 1880), showed Charles Stewart (no relation) and his bride Mae, daughter of financier Anthony J. Drexel, leaving for their honeymoon. Subsequent group portraits depicted his friends — including actresses, celebrities and aristocrats — often with a self-portrait somewhere in the crowd.

He exhibited regularly at the Paris Salon from 1878 into the early 20th century, and helped organize the "Americans in Paris" section of the 1894 Salon. The Baptism (Los Angeles County Museum of Art, 1892), which reportedly depicts a gathering of the Vanderbilt family, was shown at the 1893 Chicago World's Columbian Exposition, and received acclaim at the 1895 Berlin International Exposition.

He painted a series of sailing pictures aboard James Gordon Bennett, Jr.'s yacht Namouna. The most accomplished of these, On the Yacht "Namouna", Venice (Wadsworth Atheneum, 1890), showed a sailing party on deck and included a portrait of the actress Lillie Langtry. Another, Yachting on the Mediterranean (1896), set a record price for the artist, selling in 2005 for US$2.3 million.

Late in life, he turned to painting outdoor nudes and Venetian scenes, but Stewart is best remembered for his Belle Époque society portraits.

== Selected works ==
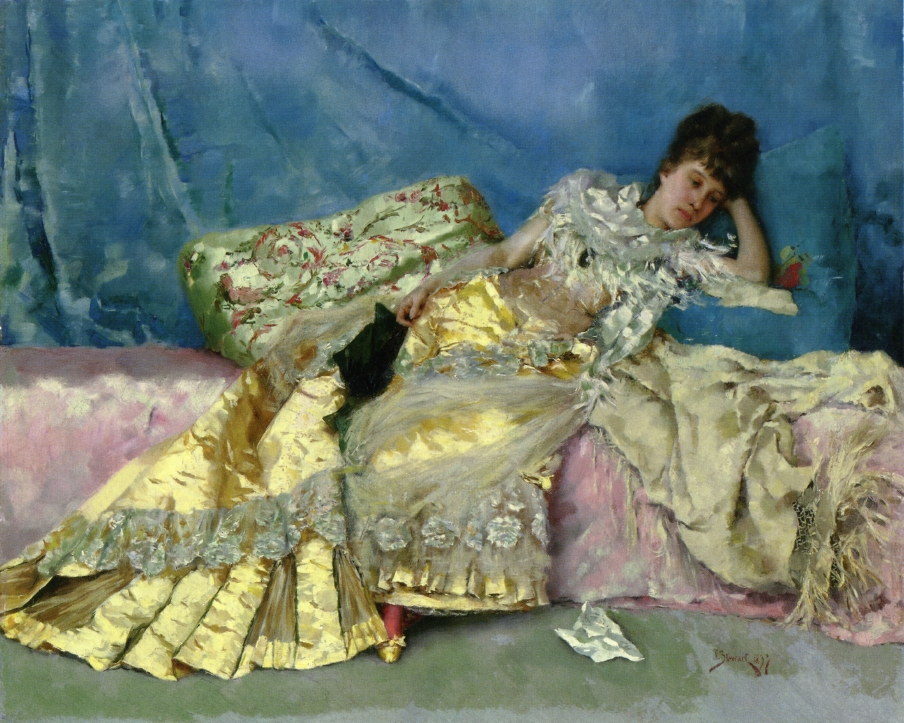
Lady on a Pink Divan (1877)

- Horse Trough on a Cuban Plantation (1876), Pennsylvania Academy of the Fine Arts, Philadelphia, Pennsylvania
- After the Wedding (aka Parisian Wedding) (1880), Drexel University Museum, Philadelphia, Pennsylvania
- Five O'Clock Tea (1884), Iris & B. Gerald Cantor collection, New York City
- The Hunt Ball (1885), Essex Club, Newark, New Jersey. Includes portraits of the actress Lillie Langtry and Baron Rothschild.
- On the Yacht "Namouna", Venice (1890), Wadsworth Atheneum, Hartford, Connecticut
- The Baptism (1892), Los Angeles County Museum of Art Reportedly, this shows a gathering of the Vanderbilt family.
- Yachting on the Mediterranean (1896), private collection
- The Goldsmith Ladies ... in a Peugeot (1897), Musée du Château de Compiègne, France
- La Clairiere (The Glade) (1900), Detroit Institute of Arts
- Les Nymphes de Nysa (The Nymphs of Nysa) (1900), Musée d'Orsay, Paris
- Portrait of Mrs. Francis Stanton Blake (1908), Walters Art Museum, Baltimore, Maryland
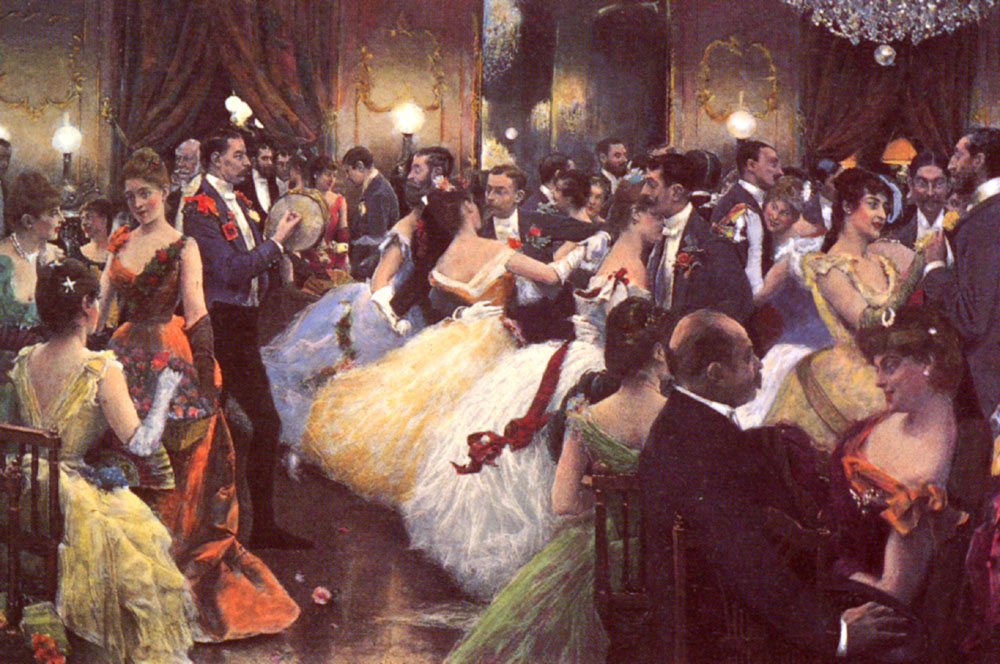
The Ball (1885)

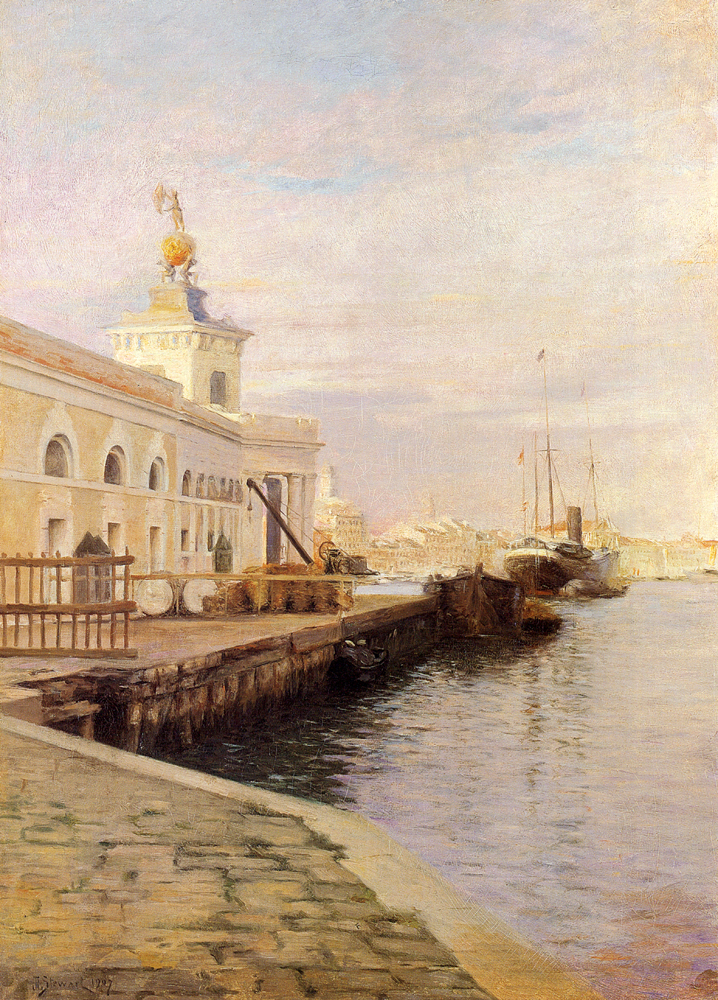
View Of Venice (The Dogana) (1907)

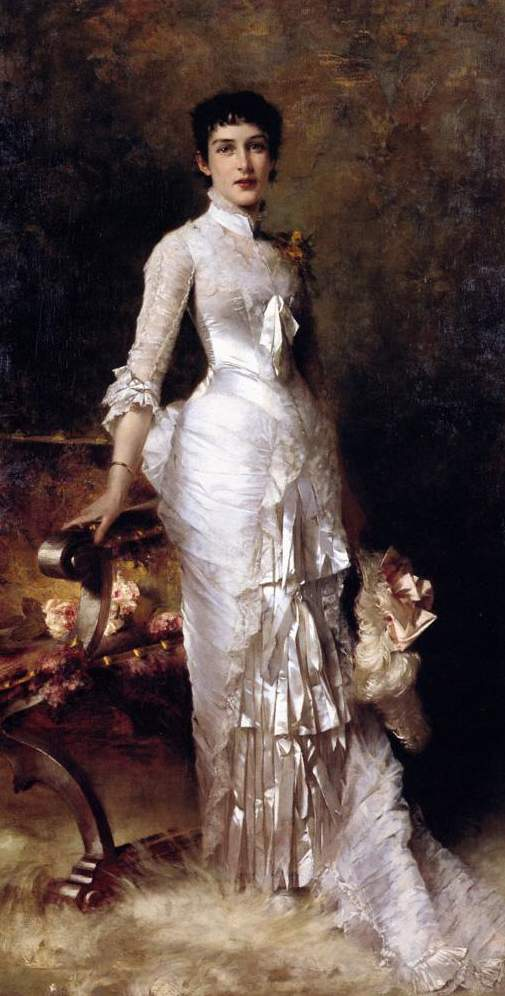
Young Beauty In A White Dress

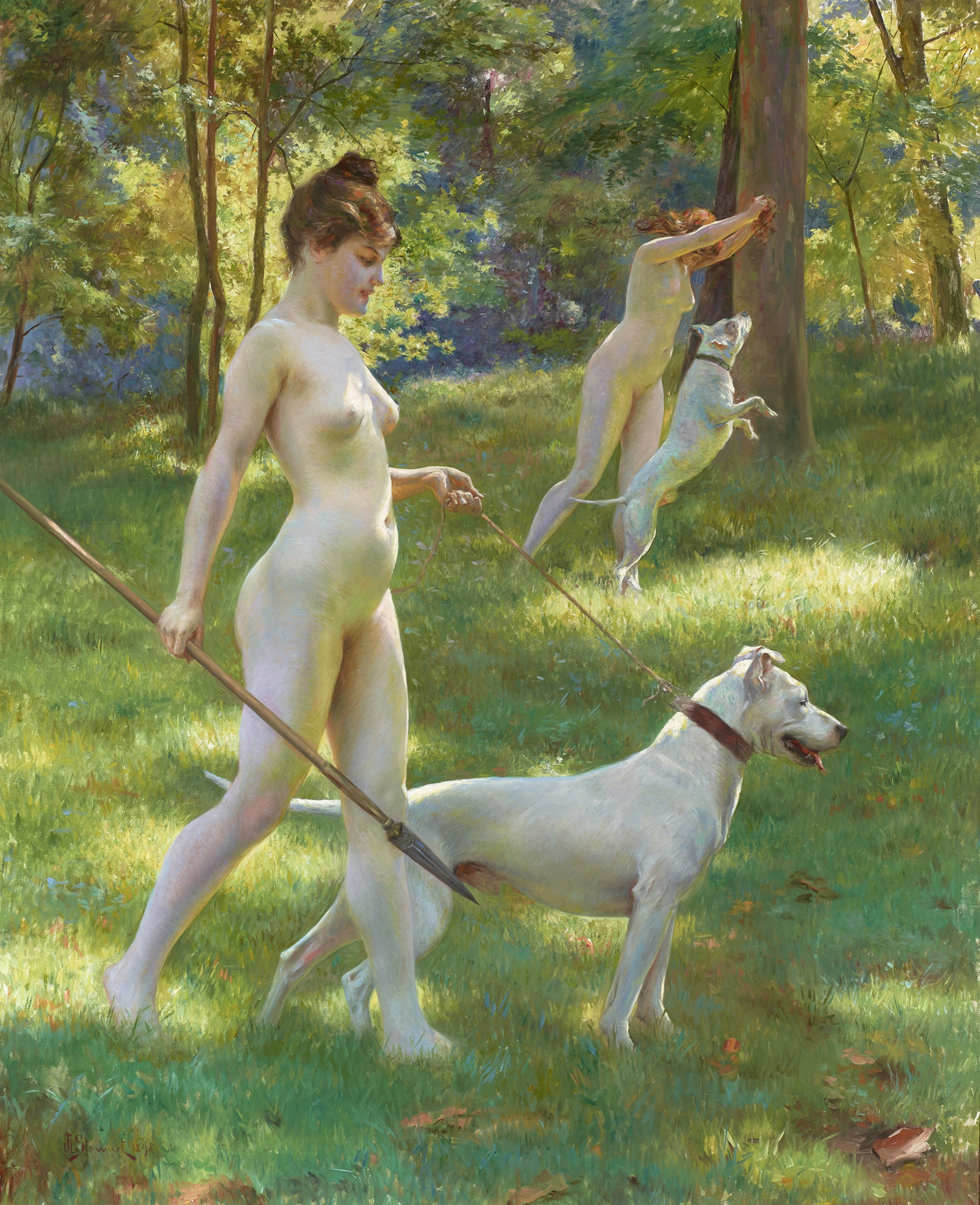
Nymphs Hunting or Hunting (1898)

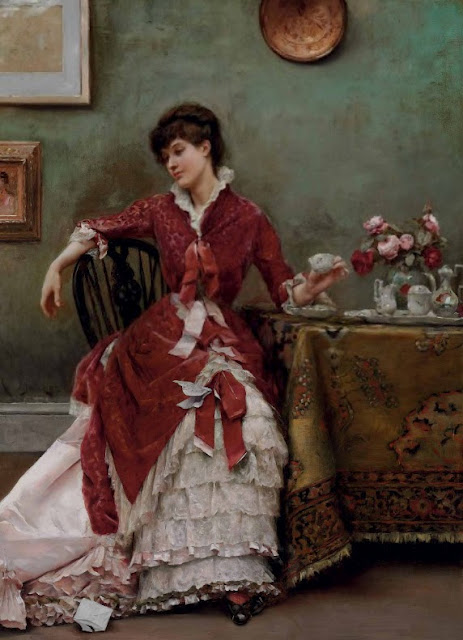
Disappointment: Portrait of Sarah Bernhardt (1882)

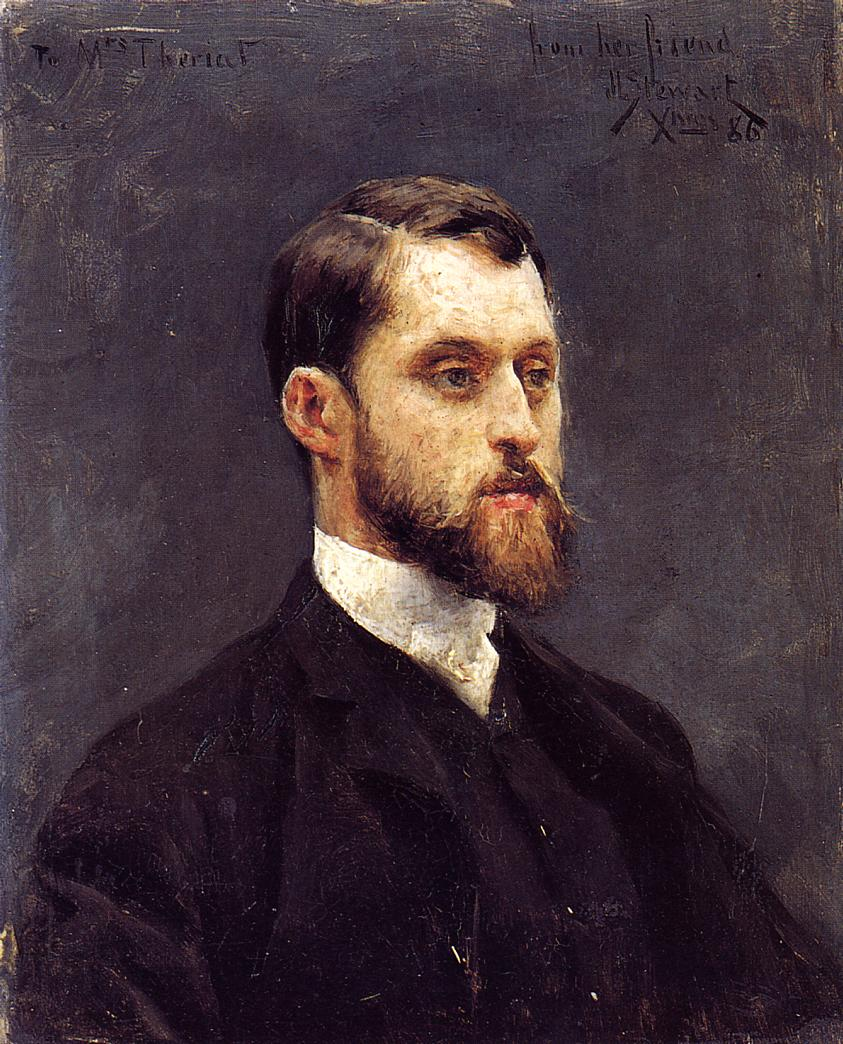
Self-portrait (1886)

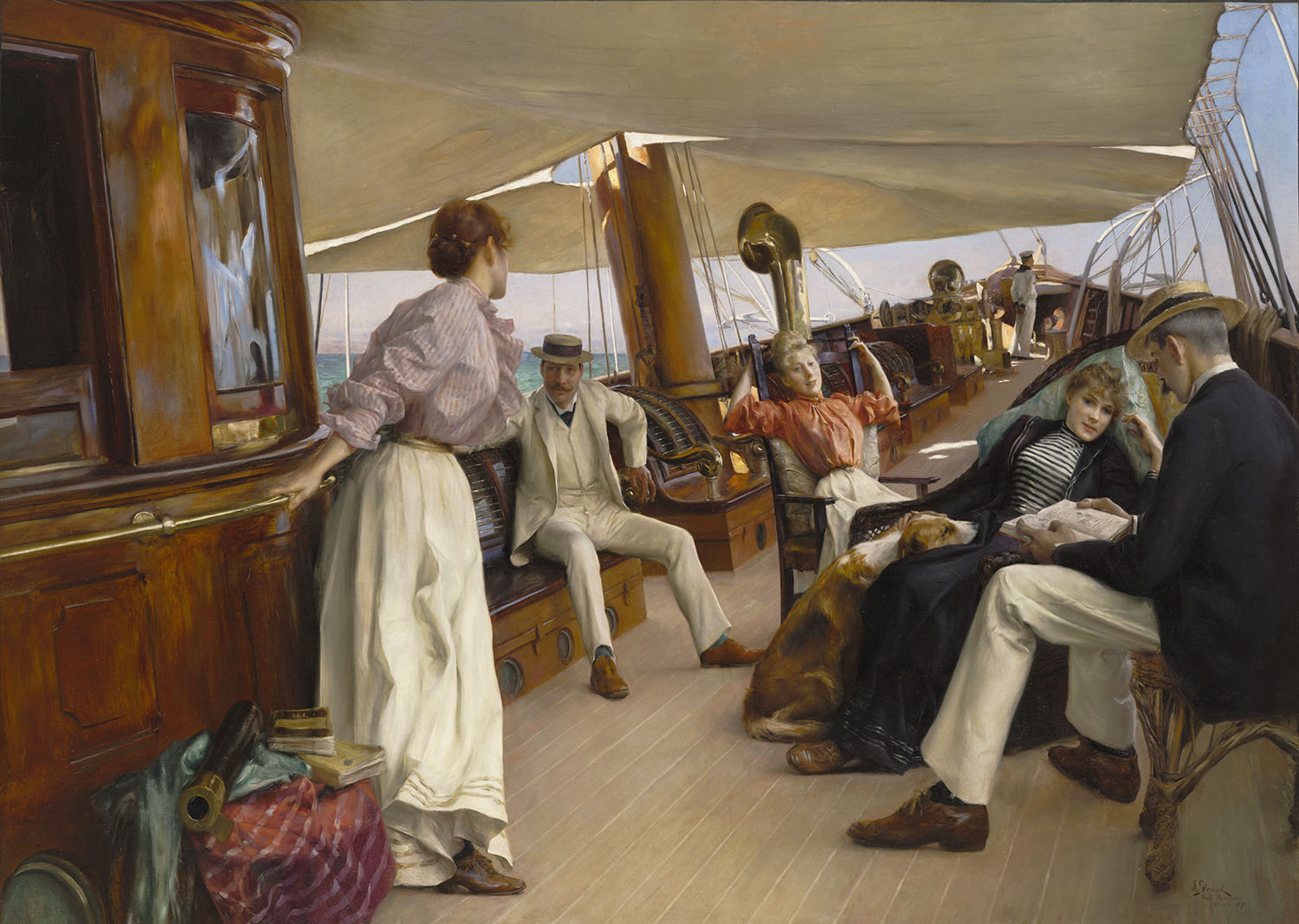
On the Yacht "Namouna", Venice (1890), Wadsworth Atheneum. Lillie Langtry is the seated woman, right.

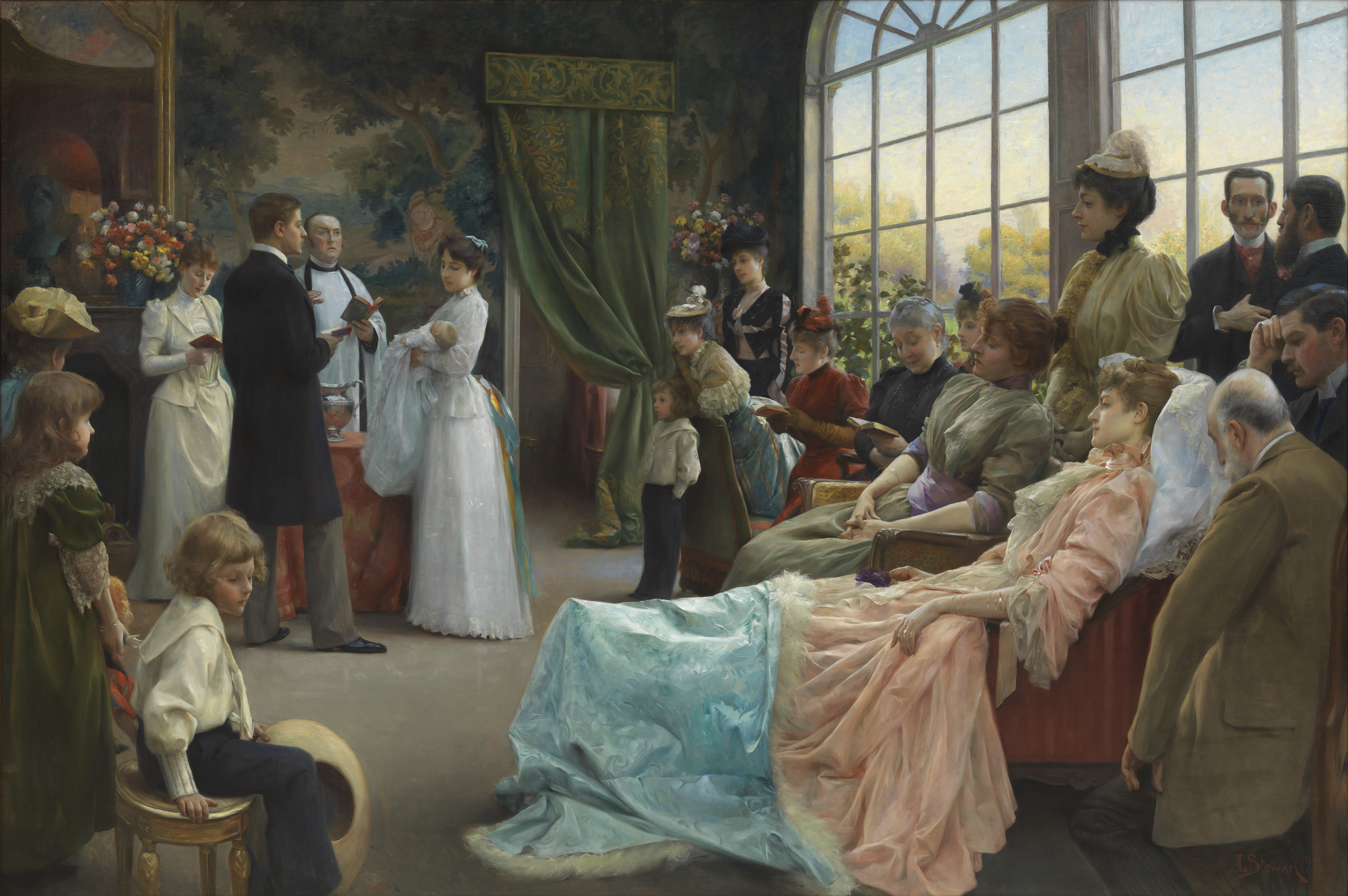
The Baptism (1892), Los Angeles County Museum of Art

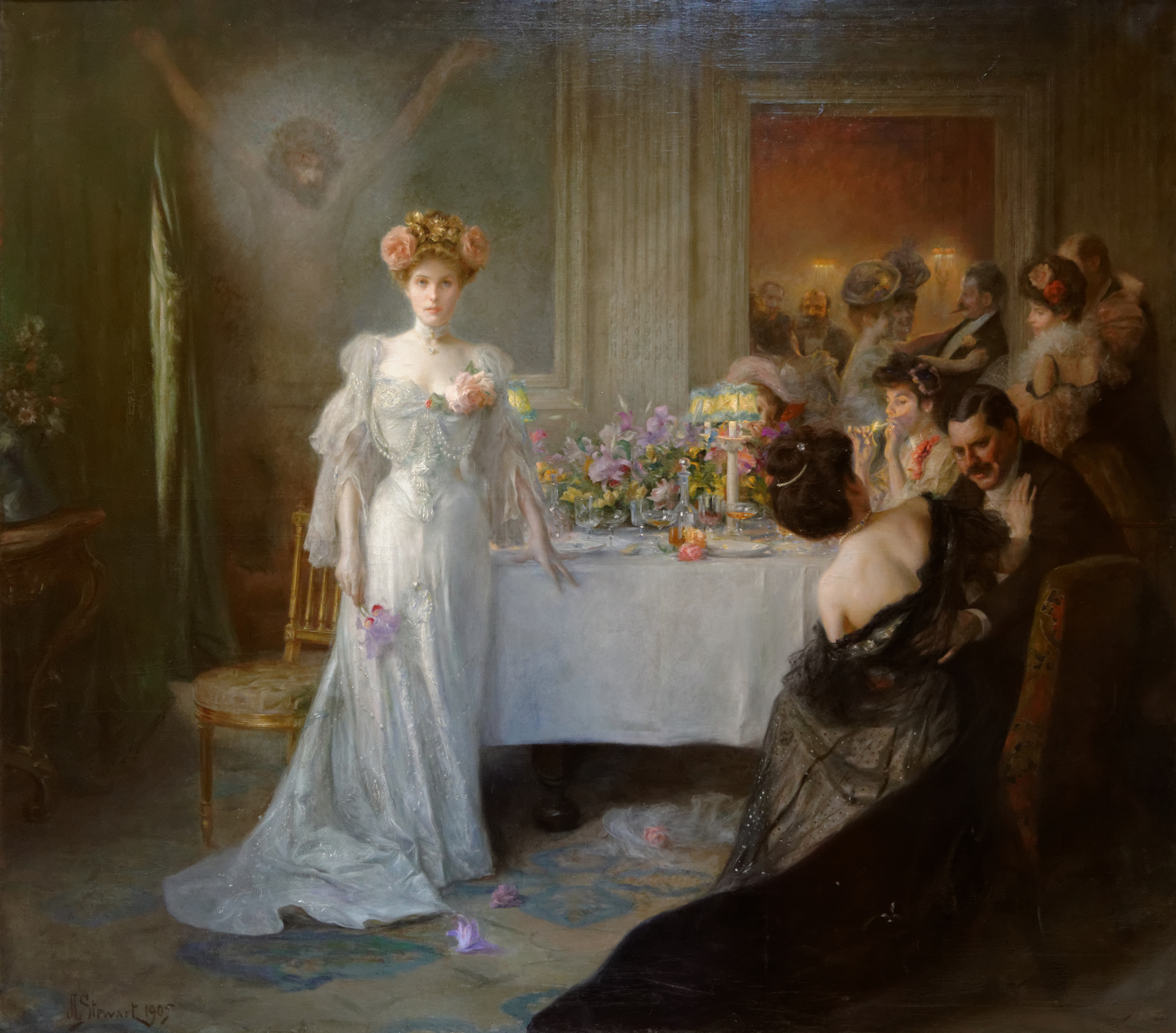
Rédemption (1895), Musée d'Art et d'Industrie, Roubaix, France

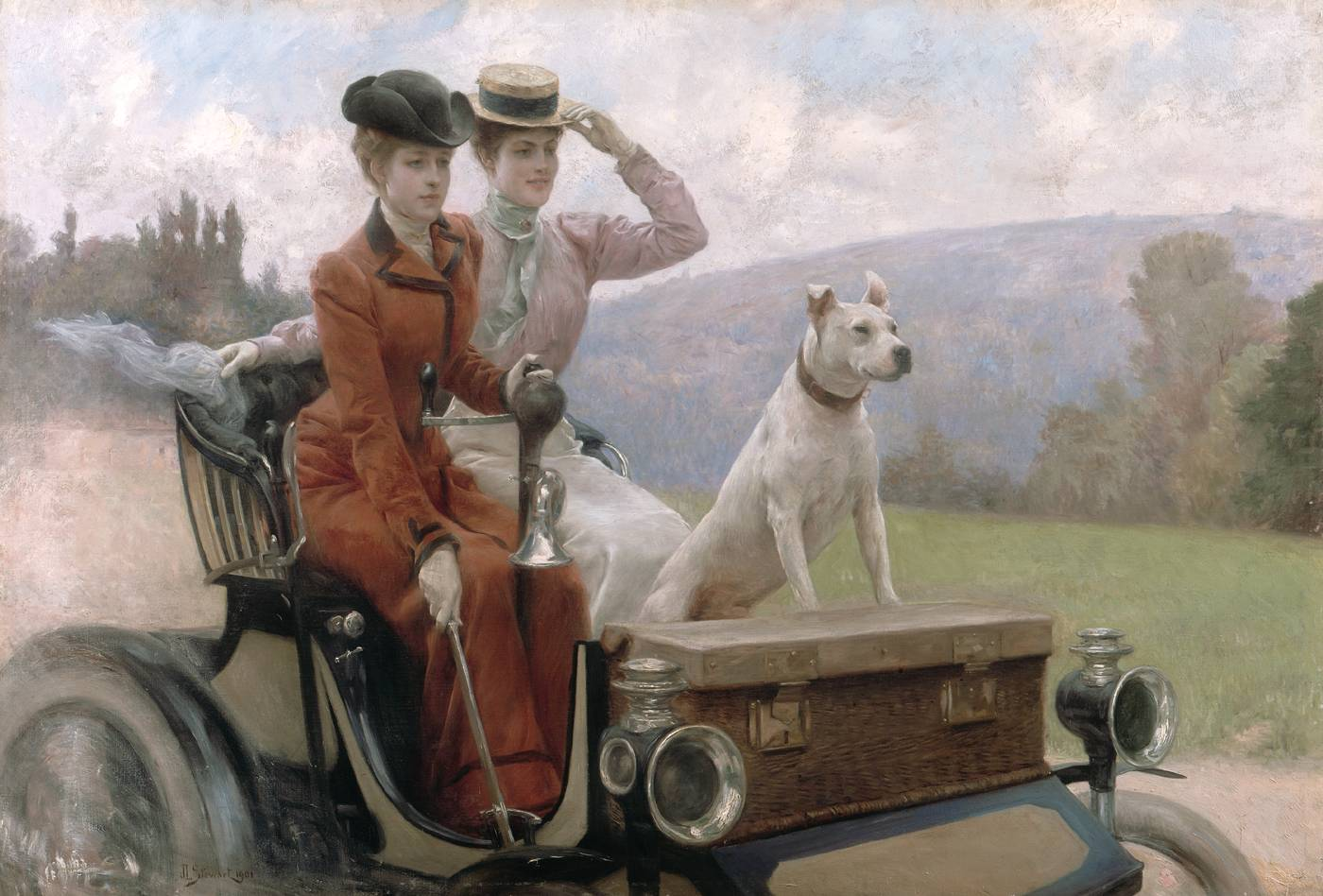
The Goldsmith Ladies ... in a Peugeot (1897), Musée du Château de Compiègne, France

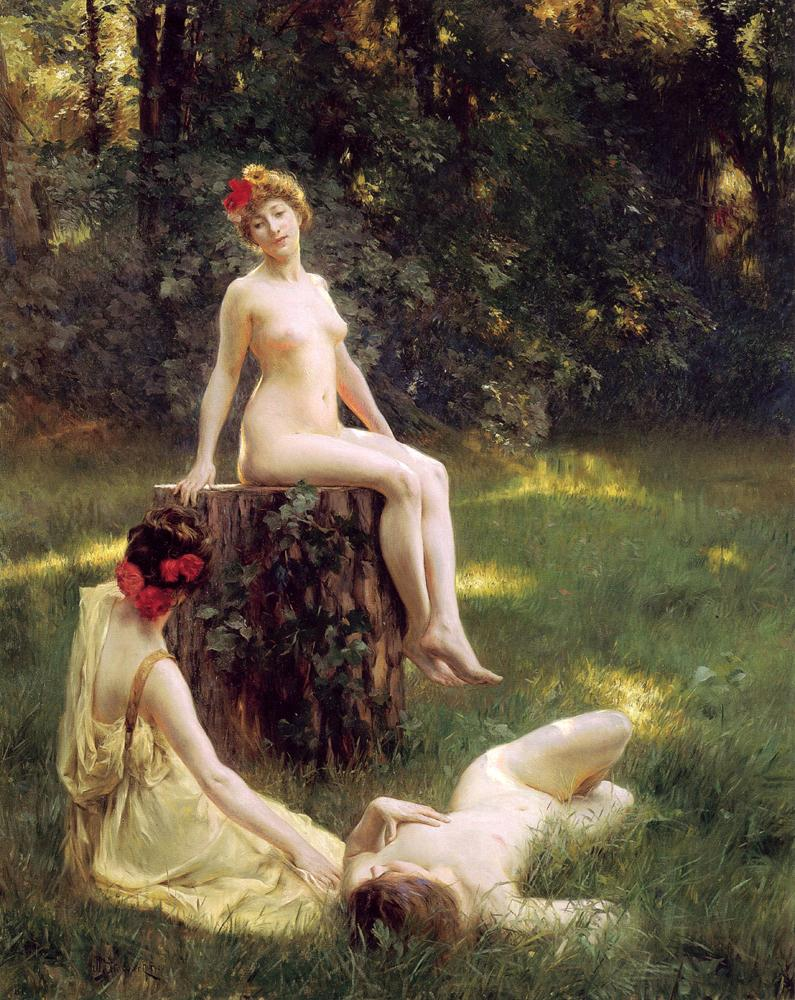
The Glade (1900), Detroit Institute of Art

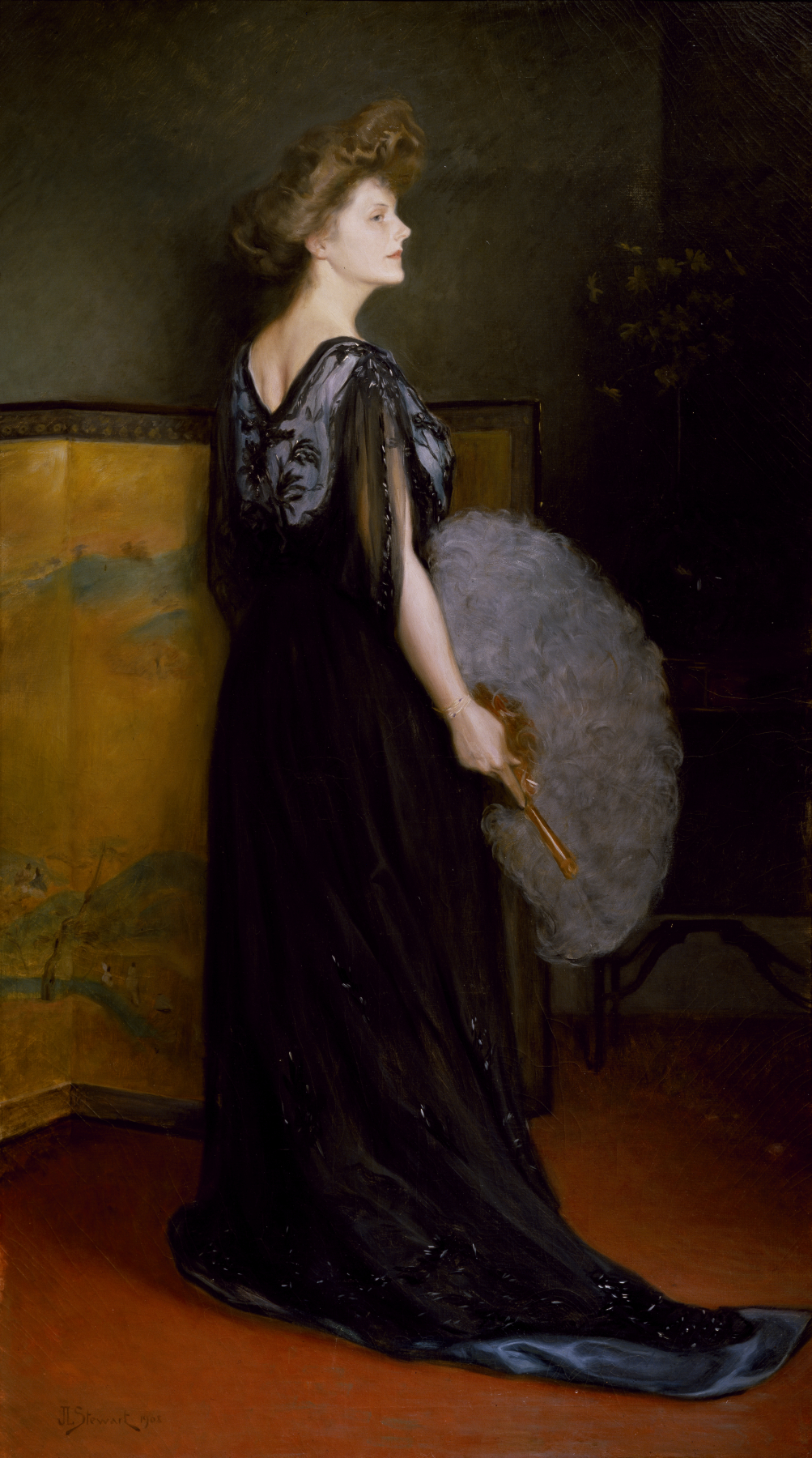
Portrait of Mrs. Francis Stanton Blake (1908), Walters Art Museum
