= Miguel Zamacoïs =

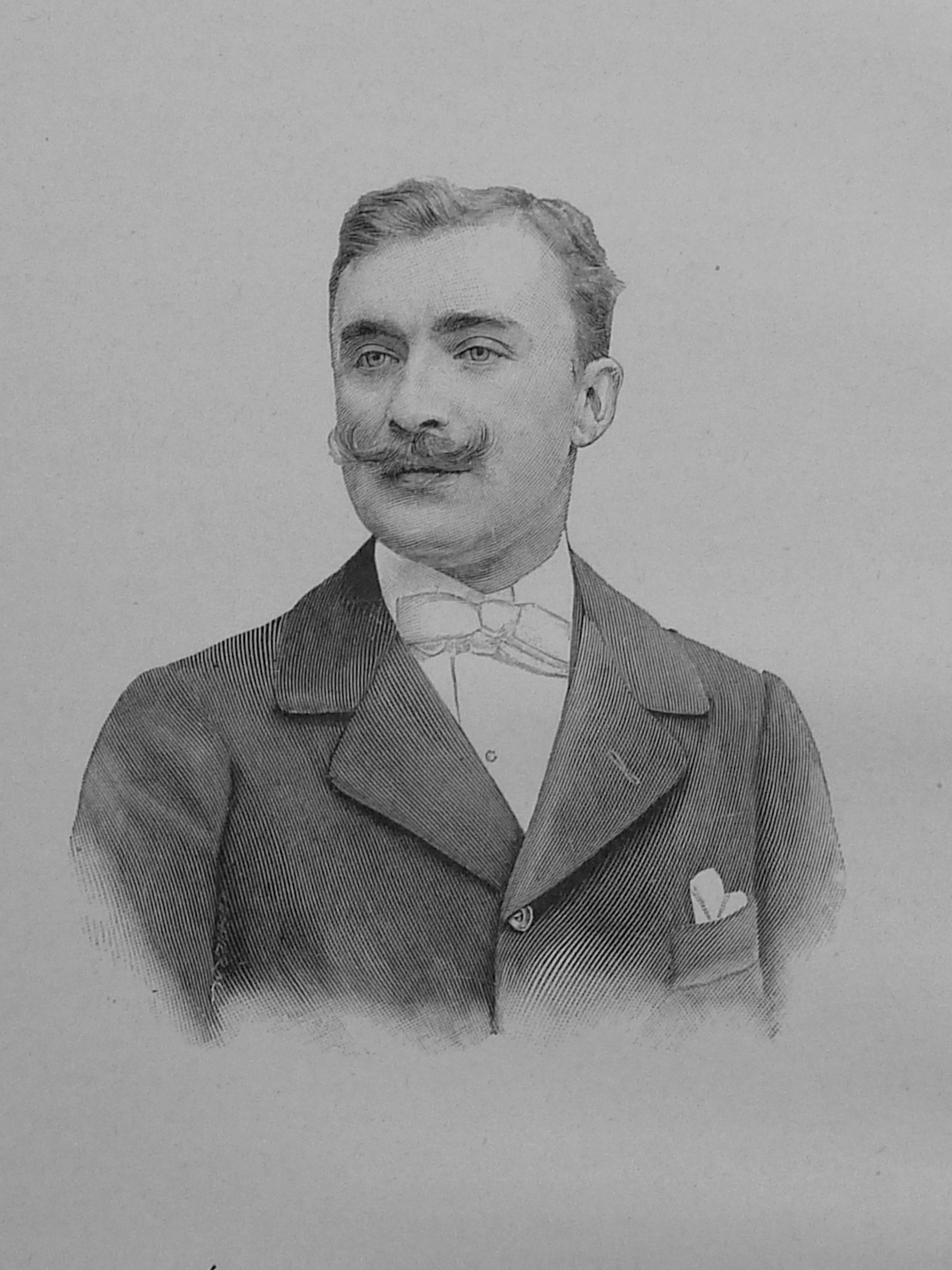
- Born: Miguel Louis Pascal Zamacoïs; 8 September 1866; Louveciennes, France
- Died: 22 March 1955 (aged 88); Paris, France
- Resting place: Père Lachaise Cemetery division 93
- Occupation: Writer
- Spouse: Marie Thérèse Ozanne

Signature
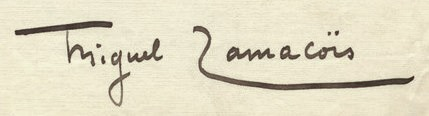

Miguel Zamacoïs (8 September 1866 in Louveciennes – 22 March 1955 in Paris) was a French writer, novelist, poet and journalist. He was the son of the Spanish painter Eduardo Zamacois y Zabala, nephew of the writer Niceto de Zamacois, the singer Elisa Zamacois, and the actor Ricardo Zamacois, and also was cousin of the writer Eduardo Zamacois and the music composer Joaquín Zamacois.

== Biography ==
Miguel Louis Pascal Zamacoïs, born on 8 September 1866 in Louveciennes, son of the Spanish Basque painter Eduardo Zamacois y Zabala and French Marie Louise Perrin. He had a sister Marie Hélène Zamacoïs, born after their father death. His father's relatives included numerous artists: writers, actors and musicians. Of Basque ancestry by his father, their surname originated in Hasparren, France, where their surname was spelled "Samacoys" at 18th century.

He is known as a novelist, he also wrote about 12 theater pieces, including Les Bouffons, created by Sarah Bernhardt, and is author of musical livrets and opera comic musics, tales and fantastical poems. He wrote L'Arche de Noé (1911), a book of poems about animals, and La Française (1915), military march with Camille Saint-Saëns for the music.

At 65, on 15 December 1931, he married Marie Thérèse Ozanne in Versailles. During the 1930s, he also wrote as a journalist in the newspaper Je suis partout.

In 1948, he edited his memoirs, Pinceaux et stylos, describing 60 years of Parisian life. He used to quite often visit his friend and neighbour, the sculptor Pierre-Nicolas Tourgueneff who had his studio in Château de Vert-Bois, situated in Rueil-Malmaison where he spent some time and had a house built in 1903. Among his others visitors were writers, artists, painters: Roger-Joseph Jourdain, Ernest Ange Duez, Jean-Louis Forain.

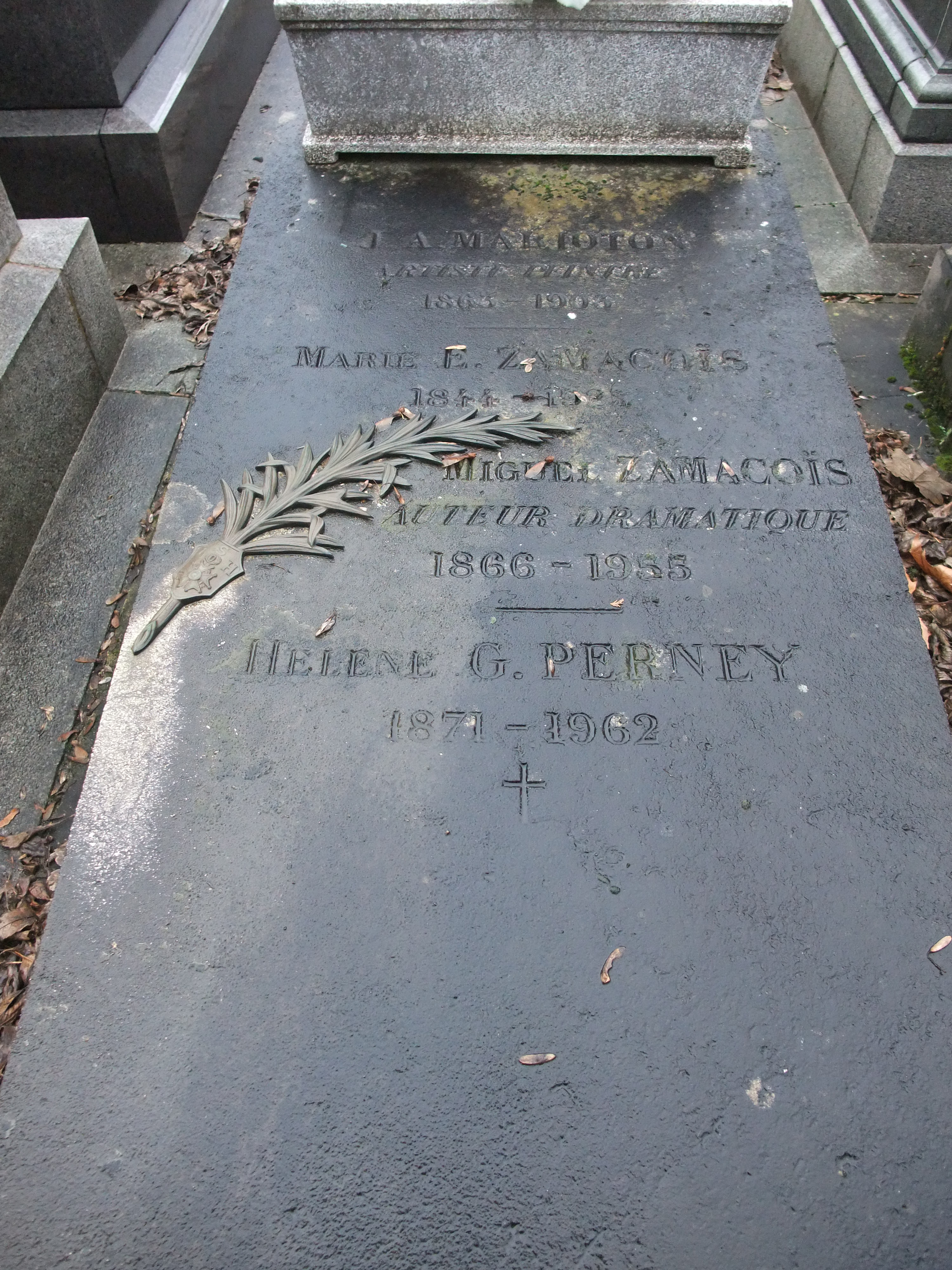
Zamacois grave, in Père Lachaise cemetery, Paris

In 1953 he was made commander in the Legion of Honour.

He died at 88, on 20 March 1955 in Paris, and is buried in Père Lachaise Cemetery division 93, in the family grave of his brother-in-law, the French painter Jean Alfred Marioton (1863–1903).

== Bibliography ==
- Le vélocipède à travers les âges (1893)
- Dites-nous donc quelque chose! (1896)
- Sang de navet (1901)
- Voyons voir (1901)
- L'agence Léa (1902)
- La Chemise (1902)
- Hier et demain! (1902)
- La Lavande philosophe! (1902)
- L'Oreiller (1902)
- Au bout du fil (1903)
- Au public (1903)
- Le Chou et la perdrix (1903)
- Soyons optimistes (1903)
- Bohèmos (1904)
- Le Gigolo (1905)
- Les plaintes du souffleur (1906)
- Redites-nous quelque chose! (1906)
- Les Bouffons (1907)
- L'arriviste (1908)
- Le roi arrive (1910)
- L'étoile en chambre (1910)
- La fleur merveilleuse (1910)
- La dame du second (1910)
- L'Arche de Noé (1911)
- Nos comédiennes jugées par leur écriture (1911)
- La dame au rendez-vous (1912)
- L'Enfant de sept ans (1915)
- L'Ineffaçable (1916)
- Le Signal (1917)
- Lettres de guerre, 1914–1915. Elle et lui (1917)
- Les Choses qui parlent, 1914–1918 (1918)
- L'Avant (1918)
- Les sacrifices (1918)
- Monsieur Césarin, écrivain public (1919)
- Les Rêves d'Angélique (1919)
- Deux femmes et un télé phone (1920)
- L'Inconsolable (1921)
- L'Homme aux dix femmes (1921)
- Le Passage de Vénus (1921)
- Le beau garçon de l'ascenseur (1922)
- Les petits lits blancs (1922)
- Feux follets et fantômes (1923)
- Une dame filée (1925)
- Qu'est-ce que l'humour? (1925)
- Seigneur Polichinelle (1925)
- Graphologue (1926)
- L'Hôtel des ventes (1926)
- Un singulier roman d'amour (1926)
- La Poule (1930)
- L'Averse et le parapluie (1927)
- Sur la tombe de Loti (1927)
- Le chat, la belette et le petit lapin (1929)
- Les Classiques ont menti (1929)
- La complainte du fromage (1931)
- Le Costume (1936)
- Annales du théâtre amateur (1946)
- Echec au Roi (1947)
- Pinceaux et stylos (1948)
- Chant nostalgique (1949)
- Alain de Kerogan, chevalier errant (1954)
