= Gloria Zamacois =

Spanish writer (1897–1946)

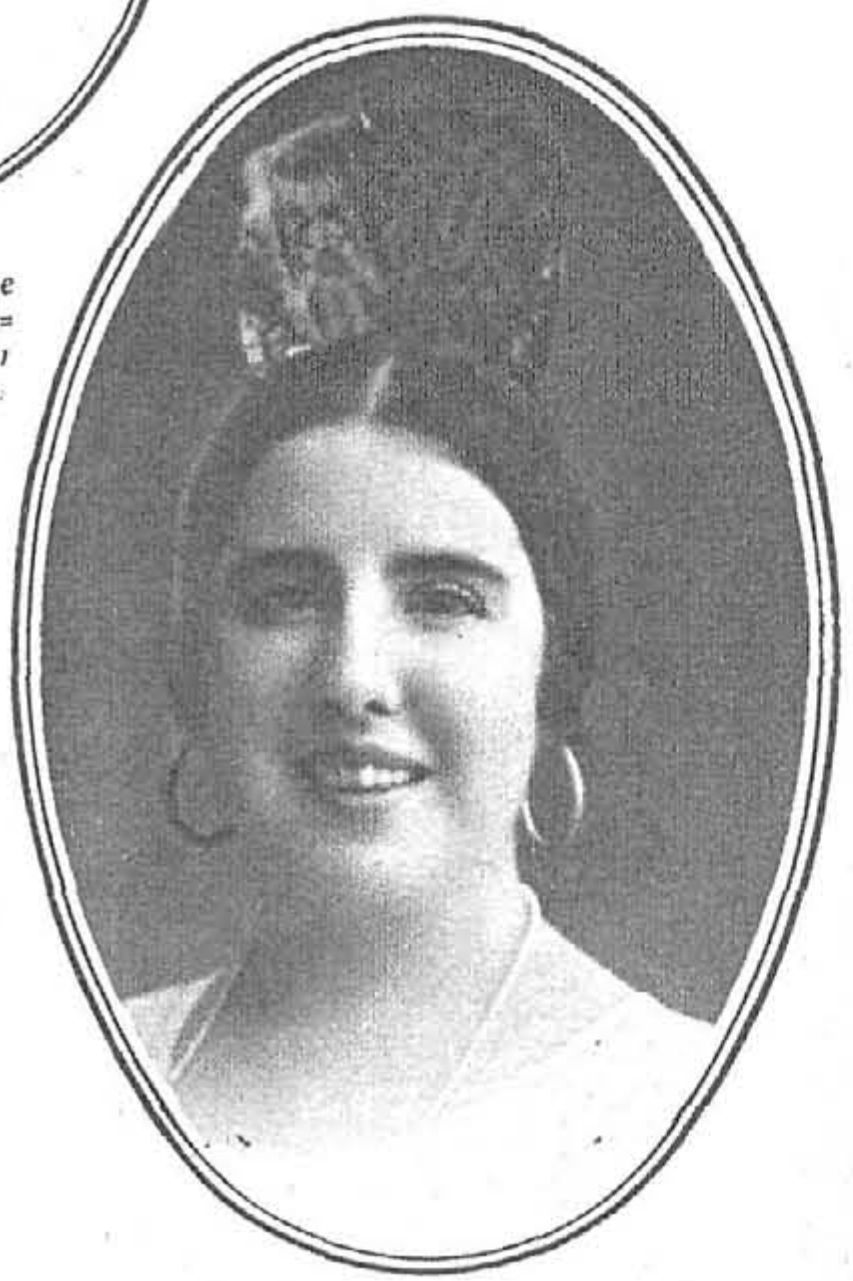
- Gloria Zamacois (Estampa, 1929)
- Born: Gloria Zamacois y Díaz; September 27, 1897 Madrid
- Died: August 1946 (aged 48)
- Occupation: short story writer
- Period: Spanish Civil War
- Spouse: Enrique Rodríguez y Compan (m. 1923)
- Children: 1

Gloria Zamacois (September 27, 1897 — August 1946) was a Spanish short story writer.

== Early life ==
Gloria Zamacois y Díaz was born on September 27, 1897 in Madrid. Her father was the writer and editor Eduardo Zamacois, who was a member of a family of artists, and his first wife Cándida Díaz Sánchez, a dressmaker. Gloria had two younger siblings, Elisa and Fernando. Although her paternal family was entirely from Bilbao, the origin of the family surname is located in Hasparren (French Basque Country), where the surname was transcribed Samacoys in the 18th century.

== Career ==
She wrote stories in several magazines such as Nuevo Mundo and Estampa.

In Nuevo Mundo, she published "Como la tierra" in 1922, "Demasiado cara" in 1928, "Golpe de maestro" in 1931, and "Por lo que died Ali-Bey" in 1933.

She was part of the Estampa editorial team as she appeared in a report published in El Heraldo de Madrid on November 6, 1929. Estampa named Zamacois as editor and collaborator along with the writers Magda Donato, Clara Campoamor, Sara Insúa, María de Lluria, Matilde Muñoz and Irene Falcón and the illustrators Alma Tapia and Viera Sparza. In an article, her portrait appears along with a note about her work. The note refers to her father. The youth of all of the collaborators is evident. The magazine stated that from its first issue, it paid special attention to the lives and interests of women, trying to show the work of Spanish women in universities and schools, at home, in workshops, clinics, offices and in sports. Salvador Bartolozzi illustrated his story "El Señor Sandrel", published in Estampa, on April 10, 1928, as he did with other stories published in the magazine.

== Personal life ==
She married Enrique Rodríguez y Compan, a quartermaster officer, in 1923. Ten months later, she had a son Enrique Rodríguez Zamacois. However, the marriage did not last long. She fled it, accompanied by her mother to France, while her father remained in Madrid. Upon returning, Gloria lived with her parents and son in a small hotel in Chamartín de la Rosa. Her father partly reflected this marriage in his novel La tragedia de un hombre que no sabía a dónde ir (The Tragedy of a Man Who Didn't Know Where to Go) (1926). Gloria's mother died on November 30, 1933. At the beginning of the civil war, she settled with her father and son in Valencia, later going into exile in France in 1939, from where they moved to Cuba with her father's lover Matilde Fernández y Fuertes. Gloria's name appears in the minutes of the Spanish Republican Aid Board (JARE), citing that in 1942, she was granted a medical-pharmaceutical card.

Gloria Zamacois died at the age of 48, in August 1946.
