= Eugène Marioton =

French sculptor

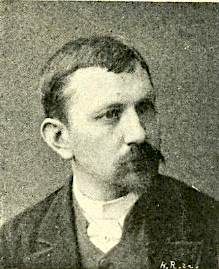
Eugène Marioton

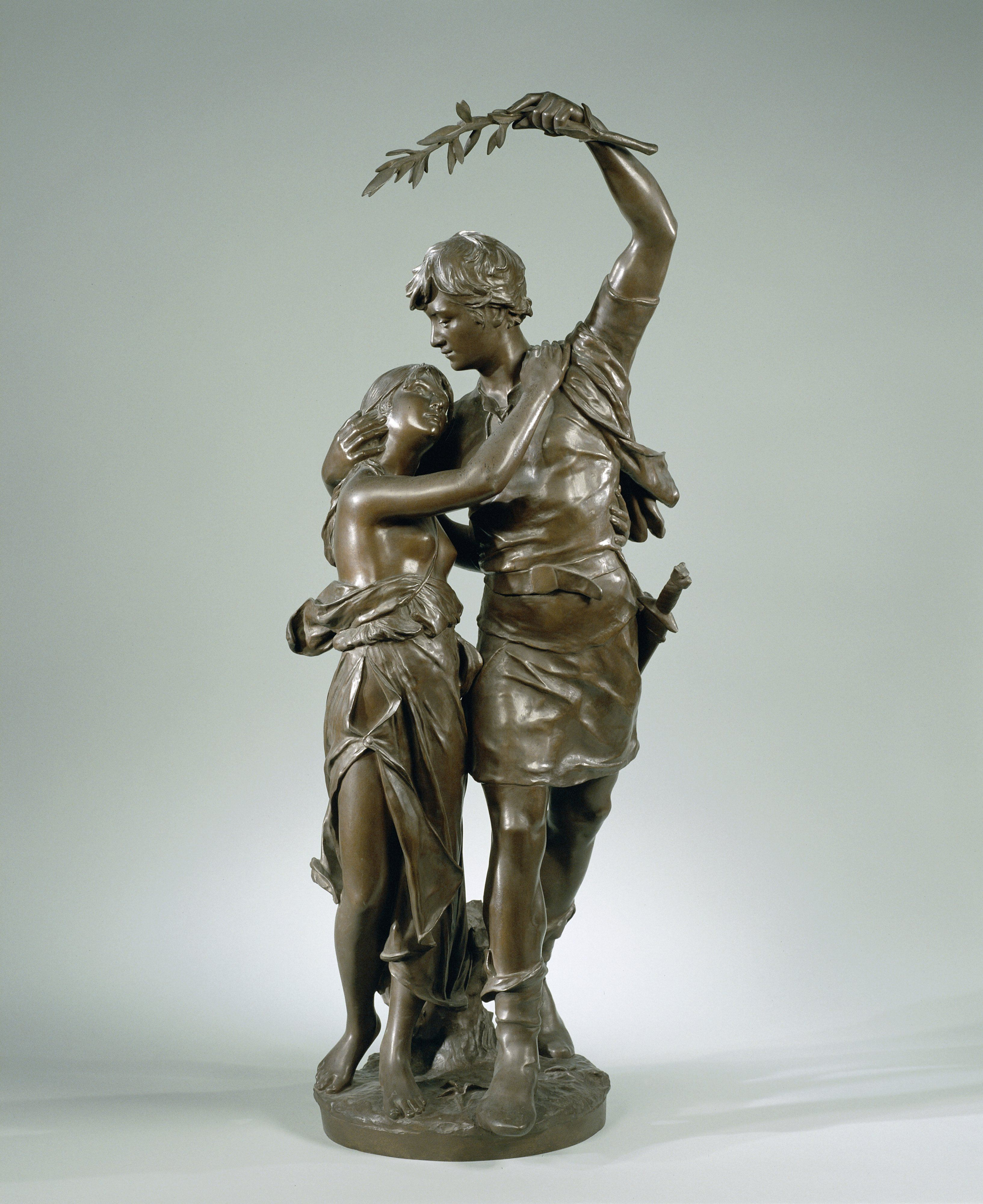
The return of the conqueror (Le retour du vainqueur), by Eugène Marioton

Eugène Marioton (7 April 1857, Paris - 1933) was a French sculptor and medalist. He was a brother of Claudius Marioton and Jean Alfred Marioton (both also artists) and a pupil of Auguste Dumont, Gabriel-Jules Thomas and Jean-Marie Bonnassieux. He mainly sculpted with bronze.
