= Claudius Marioton =

French sculptor

Claudius Marioton (2 February 1844–1919) was a French sculptor.

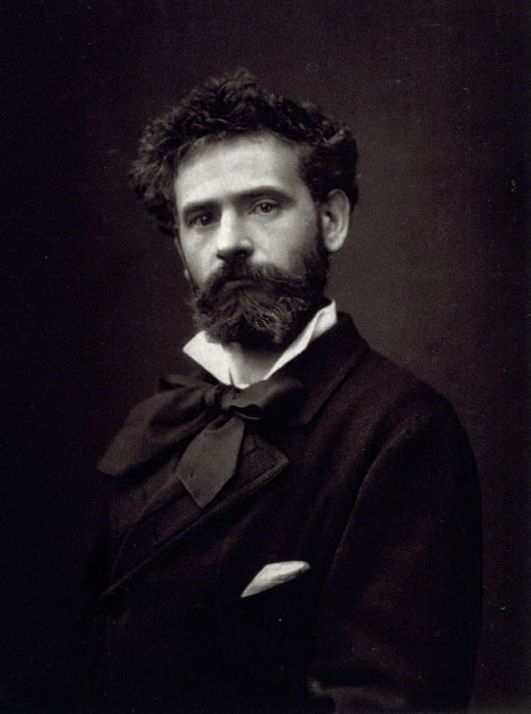
Claudius Marioton, around 1880

== Life ==
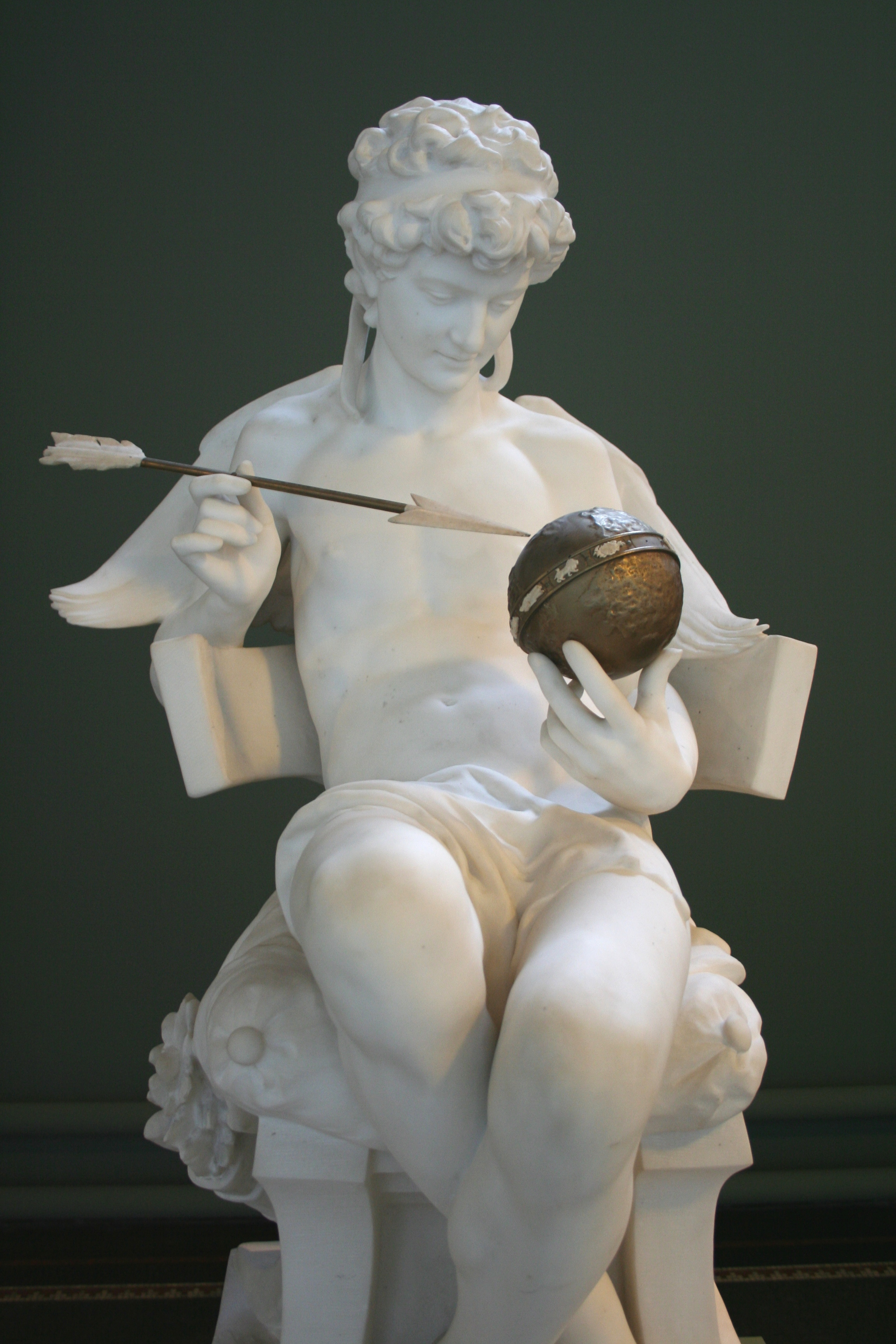
Eros Making the World Turn According to His Pleasure (Ny Carlsberg Glyptotek, Copenhagen)

The eldest child of the cook Jean Marioton and the metal-browner Catherine Magister, Claudius had two younger brothers who were also artists - the sculptor Eugène Marioton and the painter Jean Alfred Marioton. He exhibited at every Paris Salon from 1873 onwards, winning an honorary mention each year from 1879 to 1882, a 3rd class medal in 1883 and a 2nd class medal (outside the competition) in 1885. His first exhibit was "Le Plaisir" (Pleasure; plaster #6514) and Eros Making the World Turn According to His Pleasure (bronze #6515) at the Salon of 1879. He also won laureates in the Willemsens and Crozatier competitions in 1876 and 1879 respectively. In 1886, he decorated Carrier-Belleuse's cup (Musée d'Orsay)

Marioton won two gold medals and one silver medal at the 1889 Exposition Universelle. He was on the sculpture jury at the salon des Champs-Élysées in 1893 and 1894. In 1894 he produced "Byzance" (Byzantium) in gold and silver, The Satyr, a steel bas-relief with lapis lazuli inlay, and "L'offensive et Défensive" (The Offensive and the Defensive, a silver, gold and colour diptych). He won the collective first prize at the Lyon Exposition Universelle in 1894 and the following year was made a knight of the Ordre national de la Légion d'honneur. He was also a member of the overseeing committee of the École Boulle and director of the école de dessin de modelage et de ciselure de la réunion des fabricants de bronze in Paris.
