= Eduardo Zamacois y Zabala =

Spanish painter (1841–1871)

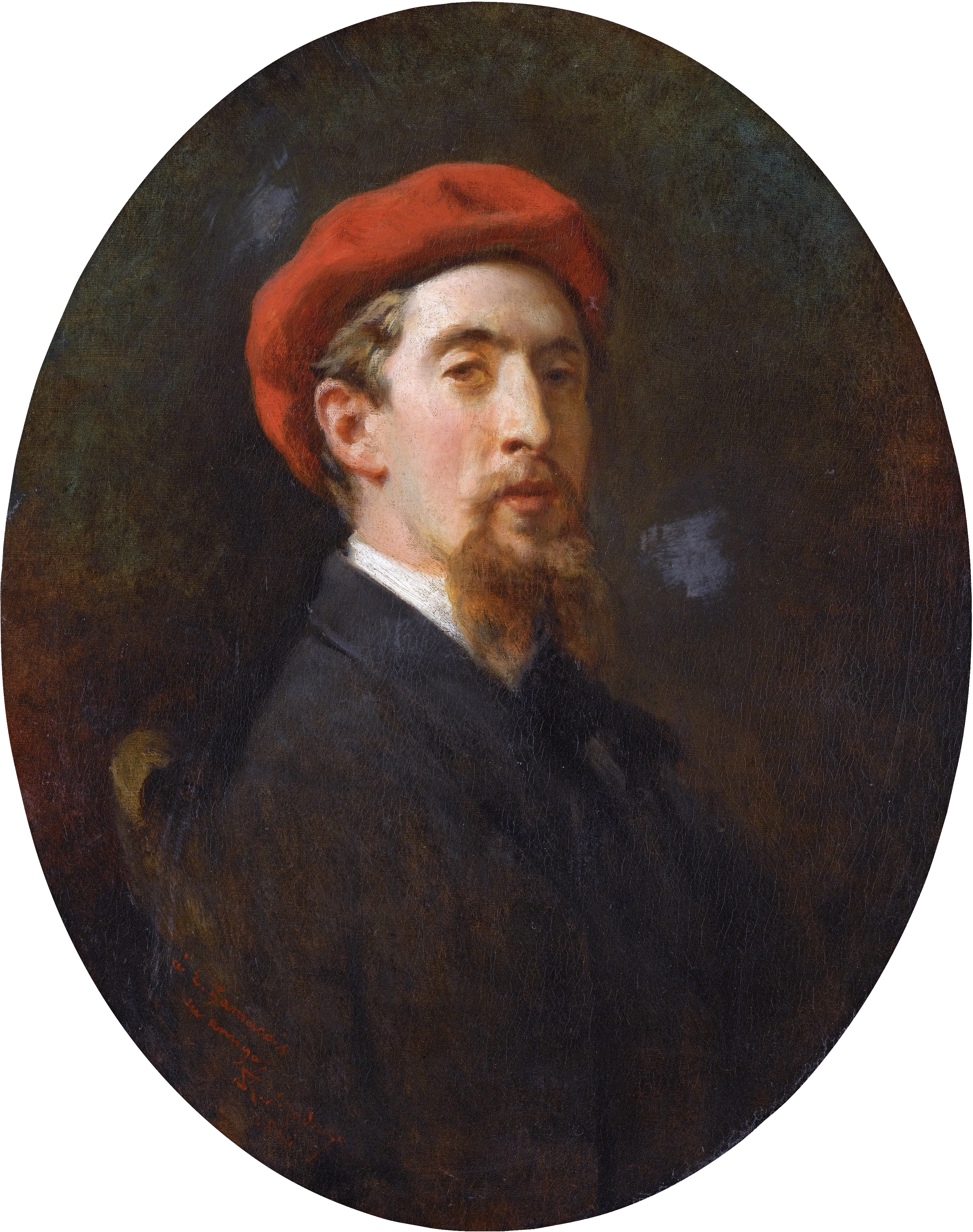
- His portrait by Raimundo de Madrazo (1863)
- Born: Eduardo María Zamacois y Zabala; July 2, 1841; Bilbao, Spain
- Died: January 12, 1871 (aged 29); Madrid, Spain
- Known for: painter
- Style: Genre painting
- Spouse: Louise Marie Héloïse Perrin

Eduardo Zamacois y Zabala (2 July 1841 – 12 January 1871) was a Spanish Academic painter who specialized in small-scale canvases. He was the father of the French writer Miguel Zamacoïs, brother of the writer Niceto de Zamacois, the singer Elisa Zamacois and the actor Ricardo Zamacois, and also an uncle of the writer Eduardo Zamacois and the music composer Joaquín Zamacois.

== Biography ==
Eduardo María Zamacois y Zabala was born in Bilbao, Spain; the son of Professor Miguel Antonio de Zamacois y Berreteaga (1794–1863), and his second wife, Ruperta María del Pilar de Zabala y Arauco. His father was the founder and director of the Santiago de Vizcaya School of Humanities. His relatives included numerous artists: writers, actors and musicians. Of Basque ancestry, their surname originated in Hasparren, France, where it was originally spelled "Samacoys".

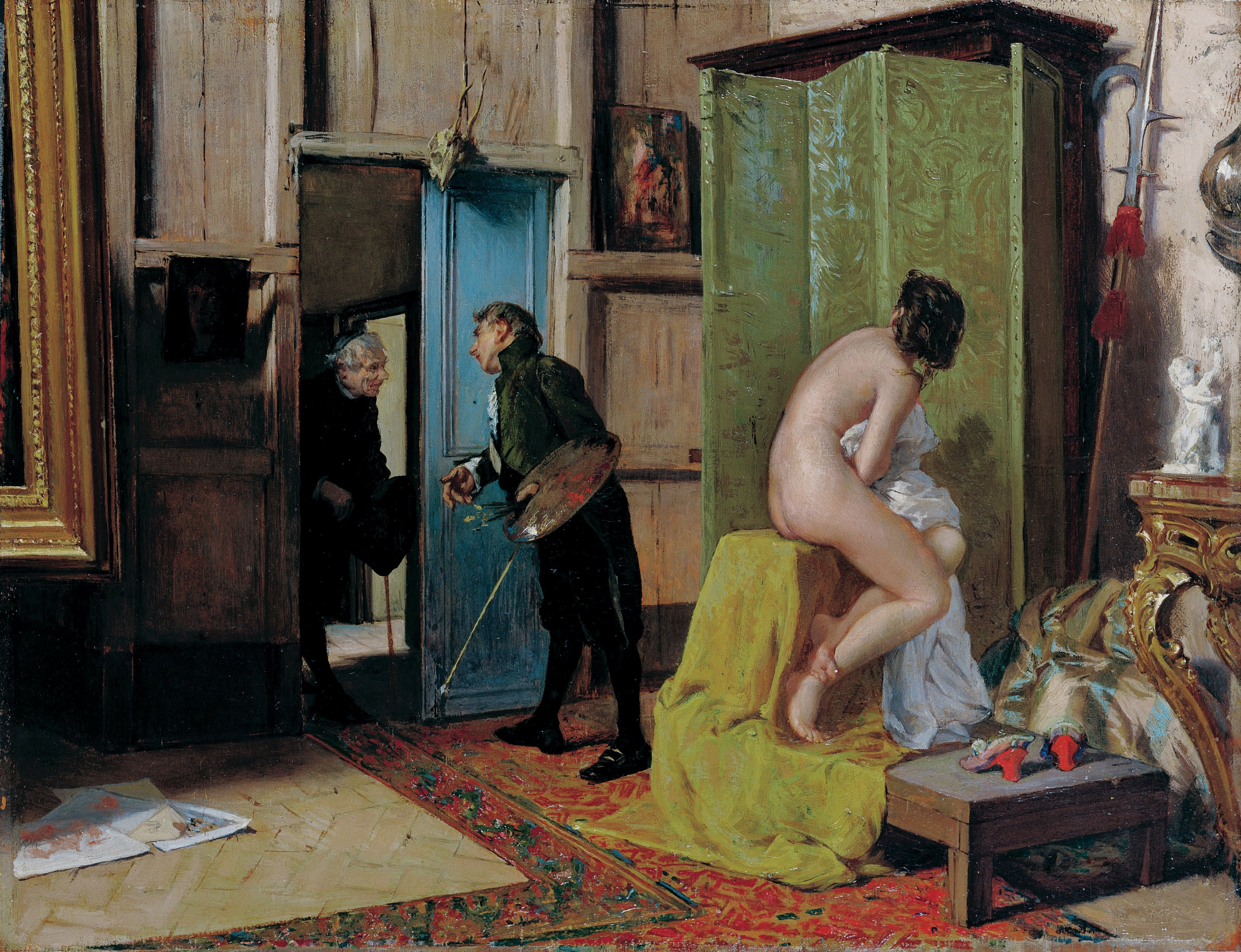
The Inopportune Visit, ca. 1868

He received a thorough education, which included drawing classes with a local artist named Joaquín Balaca (c.1820-?). Later, when his father's school closed, the family moved to Madrid and, in 1856, he was enrolled at the Real Academia de Bellas Artes de San Fernando, where he studied with Federico de Madrazo.

In 1860, on Madrazo's recommendation, he went to Paris and attended the classes of Charles Gleyre in preparation for applying to the Ècole des Beaux-Arts. His application there was denied, so he turned to the workshops of Ernest Meissonier, where he found a position.

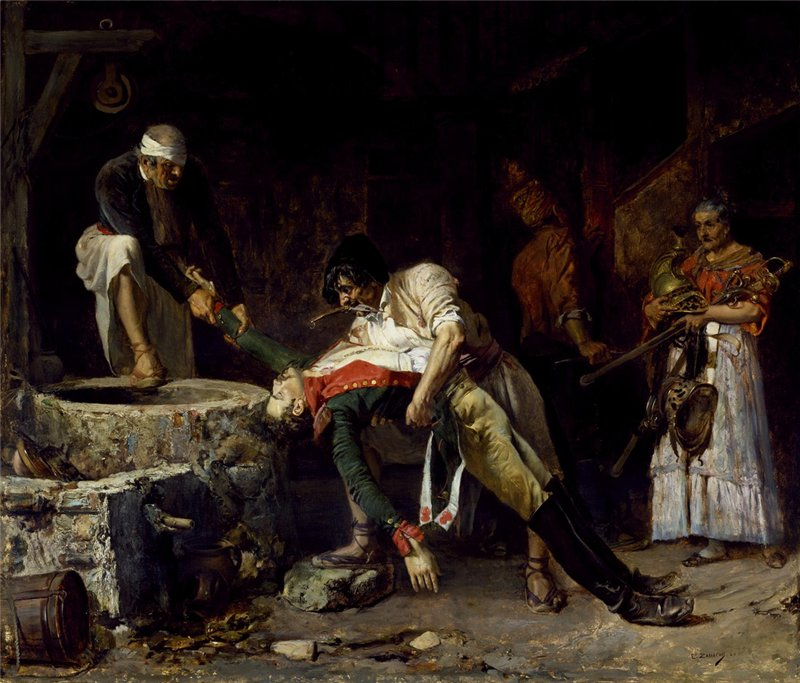
The French Occupation

A skillful business negotiator, he strove to gain access to as many European exhibitions as possible. Success came quickly. In 1861, he was commissioned to create decorative paintings in the quarters of the future king, Alfonso XII at the Palacio Real de Madrid. This work won him a grant from the Diputación Foral de Vizcaya, which enabled him to continue his studies. In 1862 and 1864, he was awarded medals at the National Exhibition of Fine Arts.

He was married in Paris in 1865, to Louise Marie Héloise Perrin, whom he had met at the home of his friend, Jehan Georges Vibert. They had two children: Miguel Louis Pascual, who became a well-known journalist and playwright, and a posthumous daughter, Marie Hélène, (who married the painter, Jean Alfred Marioton).

In 1866, he became good friends with the painter, Marià Fortuny, who did a portrait etching of him. During a trip to Rome, Zamacois also posed as a toreador for Fortuny's painting, The Spanish Wedding. Later, he contacted his friend, Adolphe Goupil, and put him in touch with Fortuny, which resulted in an exclusive contract with Goupil & Cie; a turning point in Fortuny's career.

In 1870, he was awarded the Gold Medal at the Salon for his painting, The Education of a Prince. After a showing in London, one of his paintings was purchased by Charles Dickens.

The Franco-Prussian War created difficulties that eventually forced him to return to Madrid. His arrival there coincided with the official coronation of King Amadeus I, and he attended the ceremonies. It was an unusually cold winter and he became ill the following day. He died there suddenly, aged 29, of what was described as "gangrenous angina" (possibly Diphtheria).

In 1878, he was awarded a posthumous diploma by the École des Beaux-Arts and a major retrospective at the Exposition Universelle. Goupil & Cie also published a large volume of photographs of his major works.

== Other selected works ==
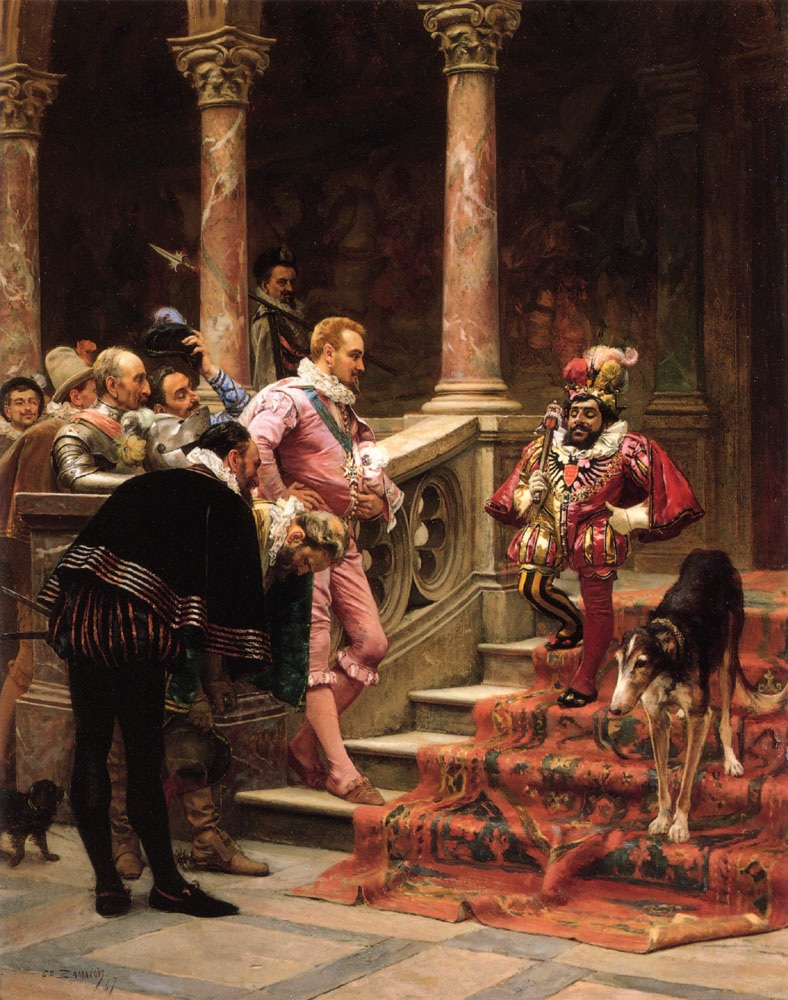
The Favorite of the King, 1865–1867

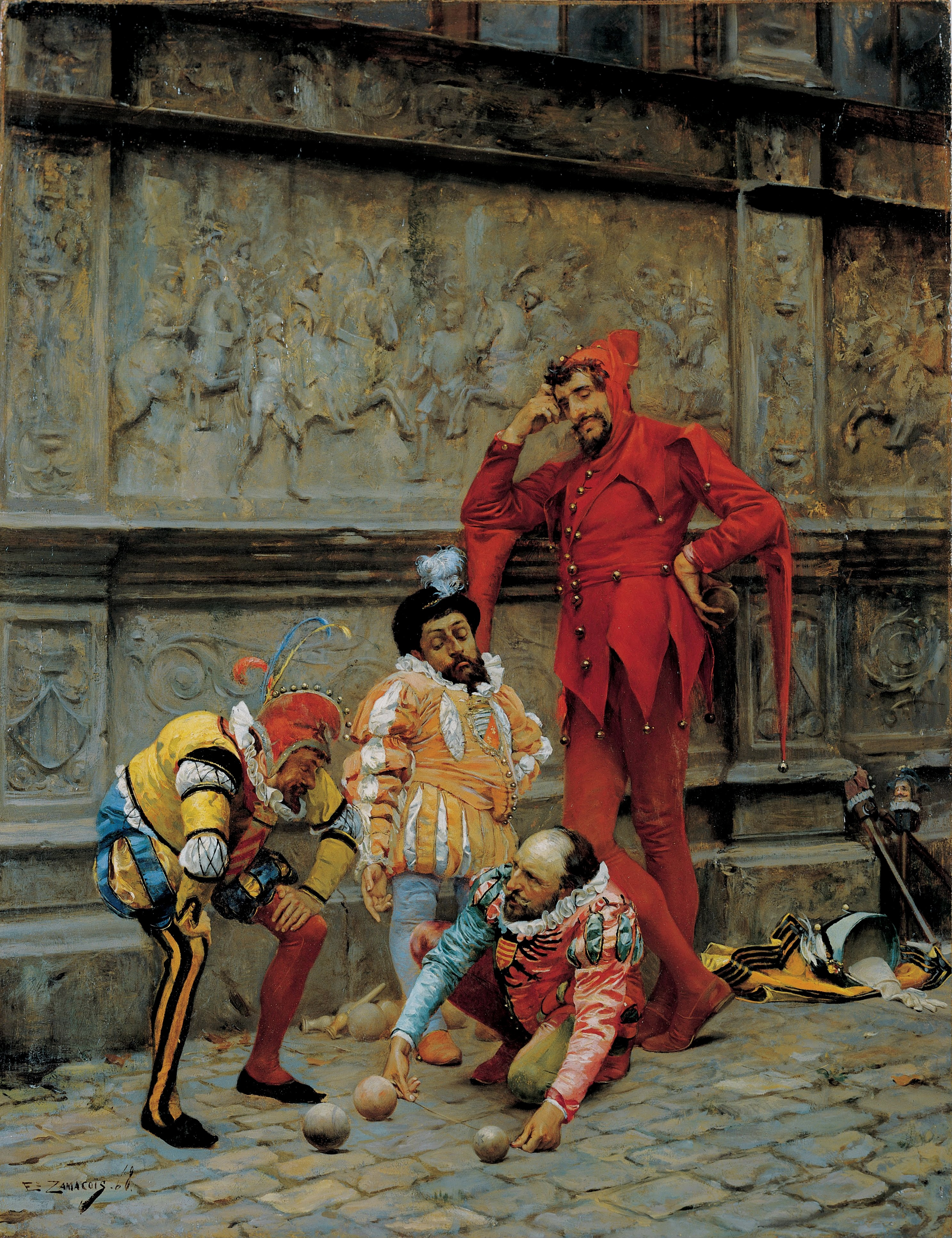
Jesters Playing, 1868, Cochonnet

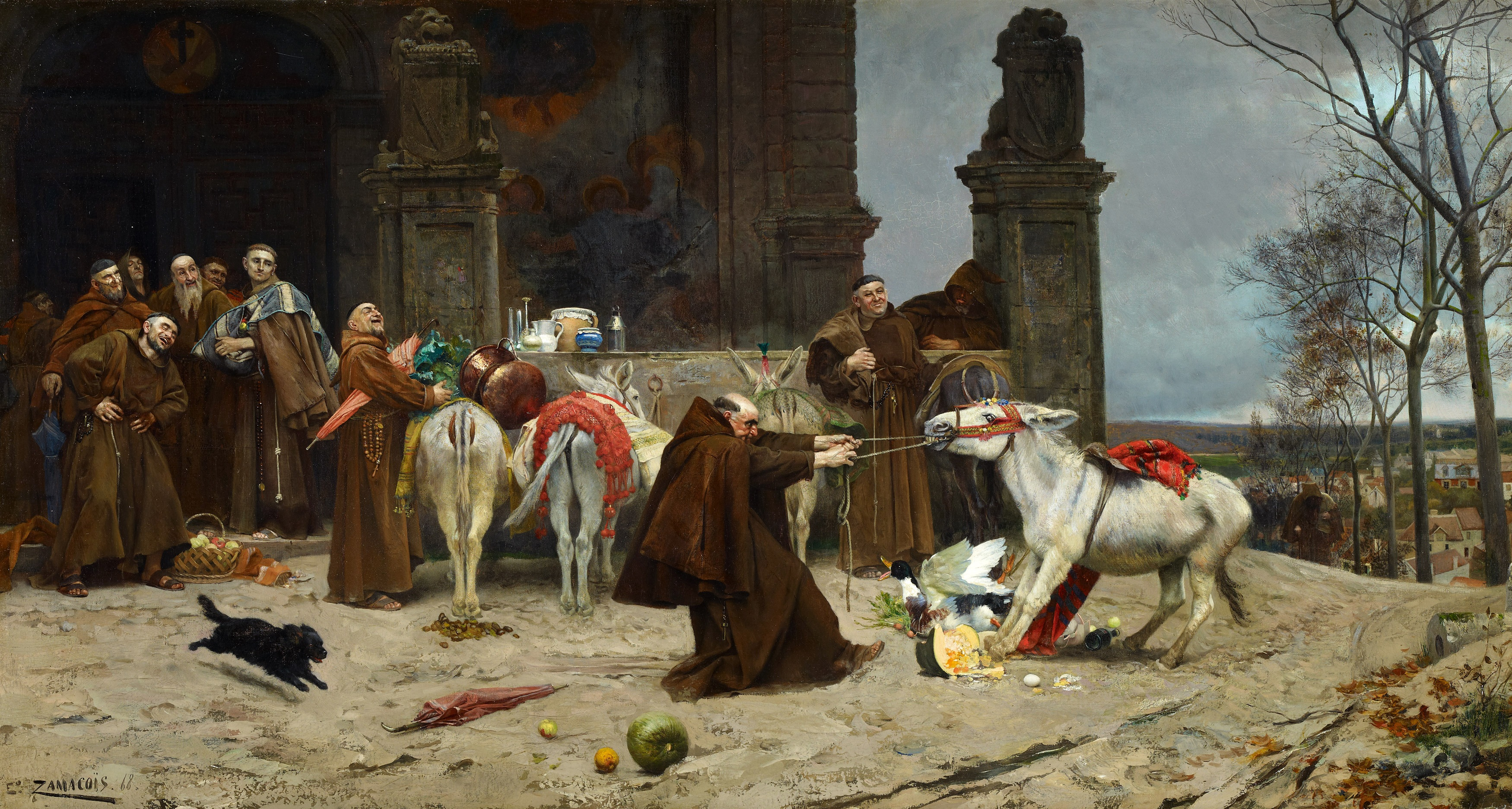
Return to the Convent, 1868

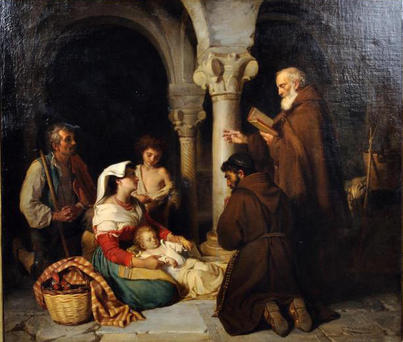
Baptizing the Poor
