= Magda Donato =

Spanish writer and actress

- Born: Carmen Eva Nelken Mansberger; 6 February 1898; Madrid, Spain
- Died: 3 November 1966 (aged 68); Mexico City, Mexico
- Occupations: Writer, journalist, playwright, actress
- Relatives: Margarita Nelken (sister)

Carmen Eva Nelken Mansberger (6 February 1898 – 3 November 1966), known by the pseudonym Magda Donato, was a Spanish writer, journalist, playwright, and actress who went into exile in Mexico after the Spanish Civil War. She was the sister of writer and politician Margarita Nelken.

== Biography ==
Carmen Eva Nelken Mansberger was born on 6 February 1898 in Madrid, to a merchant family of German Jewish ancestry. Her father was a Spanish jeweler. Her mother, born in France, was the daughter of a watchmaker who, in 1889, had gone to Madrid to work as a palace watchmaker, and also owned a watch and jewelry store on the Puerta del Sol, No. 15. Her wealthy family gave her access to higher education, which was uncommon for women at that time.

In 1917 she began writing for El Imparcial, a newspaper of the Gasset family, and later for other Madrid papers such as Estampa, El Liberal, and La Tribuna. She signed these articles Magda Donato, as a self-affirmation against the strong personality of her older sister, Margarita Nelken.

In 1939 she was forced into exile by the Spanish Civil War, first going to France, and reaching Mexico in November 1941. She began her acting career in the group Les comediéns de France. With partner Salvador Bartolozzi she co-wrote plays for children such as Pinocho en el país de los cuentos o Las aventuras de Cucuruchito y Pinocho, released in Mexico in the 1940s. Some of her best-known films were La liga de las muchachas (1950), Curvas peligrosas (1950), El amor no es negocio (1949), and Caperucita y Pulgarcito contra los monstruos (1962). Her work as an actress was recognized in 1960 with a Best Actress award from the Association of Theater Critics.

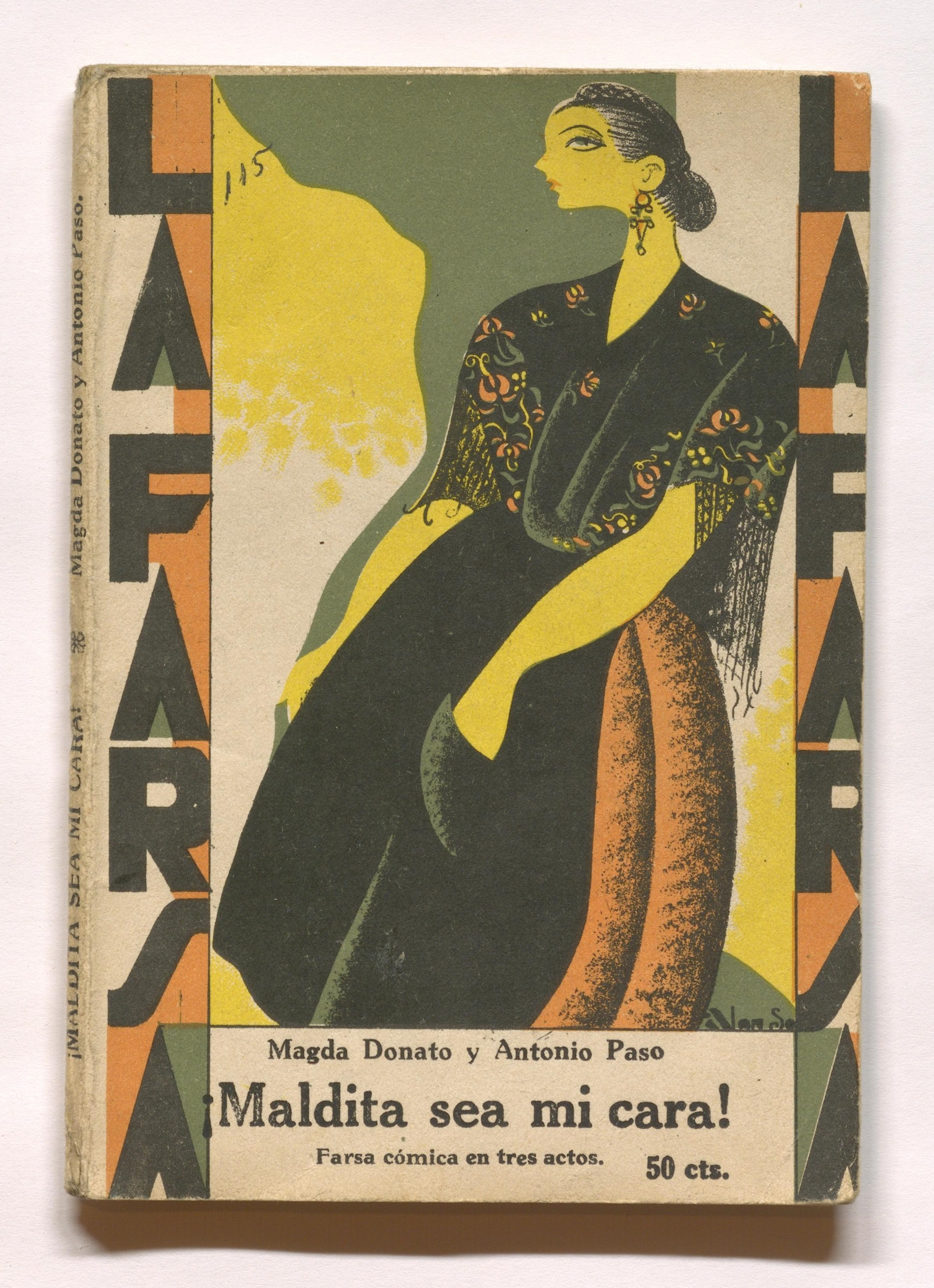

After her death on 3 November 1966 in Mexico City, the Magda Donato Award was created to recognize and reward the best written play of the year. It was given by the National Association of Actors (Spanish: Asociación Nacional de Directores y Actores – ANDA) until 1973, when it was discontinued.

== Bibliography ==
- La carabina (1924)
- ¡Maldita sea mi cara! (1929), with Antonio Paso
- Las otras dos (1931)
- La protegida de las flores
