= Salvador Bartolozzi =

Spanish illustrator

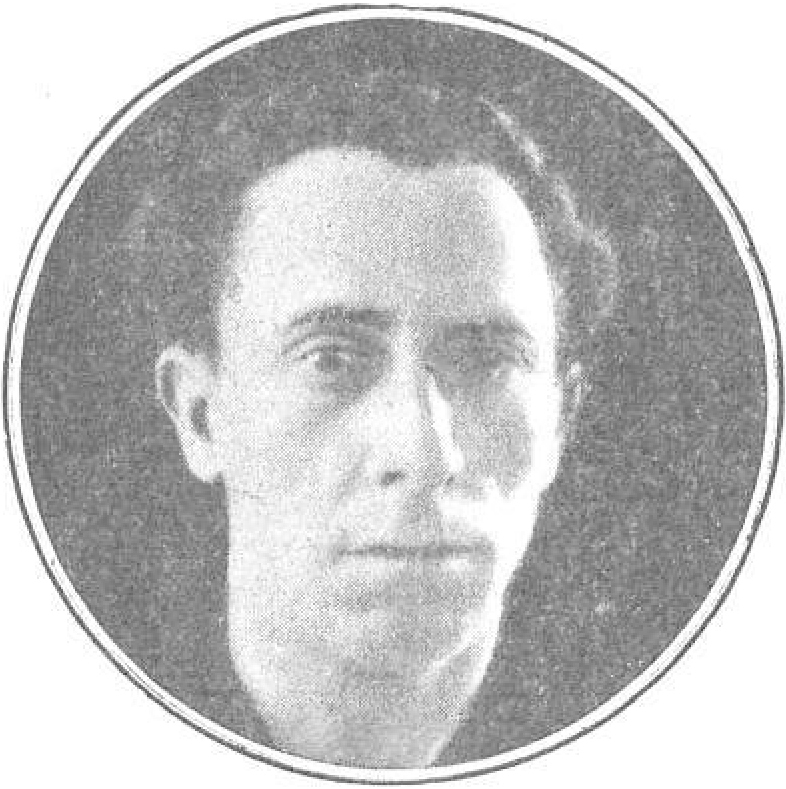
Salvador Bartolozzi

Santos Bartolozzi Rubio, well known as Salvador Bartolozzi (Madrid, 6 April 1882 – Ciudad de México, 9 July 1950), was a Spanish writer, comic writer and illustrator.

== Biography ==
At age fourteen, Bartolozzi published his first drawings in the magazine Nuevo Mundo. At nineteen, he moved to Paris to complete his training, where he stayed for five years assimilating all the latest European aesthetics.

He returned to Madrid in 1906, where he soon stood out as a poster artist. In 1907, he married Obdulia Rubio y García, and had three children: Francisca (also an illustrator), María Luisa, and Rafael. He left his wife in 1914, after starting a relationship with Magda Donato.

In 1909, he was acquainted with Ramón Gómez de la Serna, with whom he founded the gatherings at the Pombo Café, and became a regular collaborator and draftsman. During these years, he also began to illustrate for the Calleja editorial, and became its artistic director in 1915. He also illustrated for Blanco y Negro magazine and La Esfera.

In 1925, he launched a new children's weekly edition Pinocchio, which soon became the most popular children's character in Spain in the 1920s. He also worked as a creative and set designer for adult theatre. In this way, he collaborated with Federico García Lorca in La Zapatera Prodigiosa and with Miguel de Unamuno in El Otro.

After the civil war, he took refuge in France, where he remained until 1941, until the Nazi troops invaded Paris. Then he escaped to Mexico, where he continued his career as a writer and draftsman until his death in 1950.
