= Joaquín Zamacois =

Chilean-Spanish composer, music teacher and author

Joaquín Zamacois y Soler
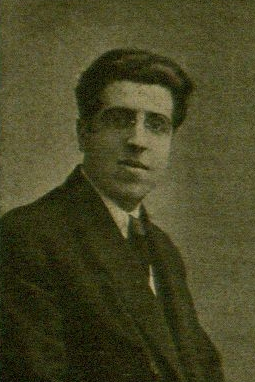
- Zamacois in 1918
- Born: Joaquín Zamacois y Soler; 14 December 1894; Santiago de Chile, Chile
- Died: 8 September 1976 (aged 81); Barcelona, Spain
- Occupation: Music composer

Joaquín Zamacois y Soler (14 December 1894 in Santiago de Chile – 8 September 1976 in Barcelona) was a Chilean-Spanish composer, music teacher and author. He comes from a well-known family of Spanish artists.

== Biography ==
Joaquín Zamacois y Soler was born on 14 December 1894 in Santiago de Chile, but, being of Spanish parents, moved to Barcelona with his family. His uncle Niceto de Zamacois was a writer, his aunt Elisa Zamacois a singer, his uncle Eduardo Zamacois y Zabala a painter, his uncle Ricardo Zamacois an actor, and his cousins Miguel Zamacoïs and Eduardo Zamacois were writers.

He began his musical career under the tutelage of his father, the also music composer Joaquín Zamacois y Zabala (alias J. Casamoz), studying later at Conservatori Superior de Música del Liceu and at Escuela Municipal de Música of the same city. Then, he dedicated himself to composition. In 1914, he was named Professor at Liceu, and in 1940 at Escuela Municipal de Música, where he was the director in 1945, transforming it into a Conservatory. Zamacois is also known for his harmony treatise and various pedagogical texts, used in Spain and Latinamerican countries.

== Works of musical theory, history and critique ==
- Curso de formas musicales con numerosos ejemplos musicales Barcelona: Labor, 1960 (6a. ed. 1985. From 2002: Barcelona: Idea Books) (Edició Americana: Cooper City, FL EUA: Span Press, 1997)
- De la Escuela municipal de música del año 1886 al Conservatorio superior municipal de música del 1963 Barcelona: Ayuntamiento, 1963
- Ejercicios correspondientes al "Tratado de Armonía" I-II-III Barcelona: Boileau, 1958 (Ed. 2003)
- Ejercicios de contrapunto I Barcelona: Boileau, 1977
- Guión de historia de la música Alcalá: Quiroga, 1975 (Barcelona: Tenora, 1990)
- Joan B. Lanbert, Frederic Alfonso, Joaquim Zamacois LAZ. Método graduado de solfeo (5 volums) Barcelona: Boileau, cop. 1941
- Joaquim Zamacois, Avelino Abreu, Pere Serra Llenguatge musical: nivell elemental, lliçons cantades (4 courses in 4 volumes) Barcelona: Conservatori Superior de Música del Liceu, 1999
- Joaquim Zamacois, Avelino Abreu, Pere Serra Llenguatge musical: nivell mitjà, lliçons cantades (4 courses in 4 volumes) Barcelona: Conservatori Superior de Música del Liceu, 1999
- Método de bandurria Santiago de Chile, 1894
- Programa-guió de l'assignatura Formes Musicals Barcelona: Conservatori del Liceu, 1938
- Realización de los ejercicios correspondientes al "Tratado de armonía" (3 volums) Barcelona: Boileau, cop. 1958
- Joaquim Zamacois, Avelino Abreu, Pere Serra Solfeo (6 courses) Barcelona: Conservatorio del Liceo
  - Primer curso 52a. edition, 1984
  - Segundo curso
  - Tercer curso
  - Cuarto curso
  - Quinto curso 17a. edition 1989
  - Sexto curso
- Temas de estética y de historia de la música Barcelona: Labor 1975 (4a. edition 1990) (Barcelona: Idea Books, 2003)
- Temas de pedagogía musical Madrid: Quiroga 1973 (4a. edition 1981)
- Joaquim Zamacois, Avelino Abreu, Pere Serra Teoría: cuarto curso Barcelona: Conservatorio del Liceo
- Teoría de la música (2 volums) Barcelona: Labor, 1949 (25a. edition 1994) (Barcelona: Idea Books, 2002)
- Joaquim Zamacois, Avelino Abreu, Pere Serra Teoría perteneciente a la asignatura de solfeo Barcelona: Boileau
  - Primer curso
  - Segundo curso
  - Tercer curso 6a. edition. Barcelona: Conservatorio del Liceo, 1950
  - Cuarto curso
  - Quinto curso 13. edition. Barcelona: Conservatorio del Liceo, 1989
  - Sexto curso 12. edition. Barcelona: Conservatorio del Liceo, 1989
- Tratado de armonía (3 volumes) Barcelona: Labor, 1945–1948 (14a. ed. 1994) (Barcelona: Idea Books, 2002) (Edició Americana: Cooper City, FL EUA: Span Press, 1997)

== Compositions ==
=== Instrumental and orchestral works ===
- Elegia
- Himne ibèric, symphonic poem
- La polvera, for tenor
- String Quartet in D minor (1922)
- Scherzo humorístic
- La sega (1928), symphonic painting
- Serenada d'hivern for viola and piano (1970)
- Sonata for violin and piano (1918)
- Els ulls verds (1920), symphonic poem
- Transcription of the six sonnets by Eduard Toldrà, originally written for piano and violin, to be performed by piano and flute.

=== Zarzuelas ===
- 1925. Margaritiña "Zarzuela en dos actos (el primero dividido en dos cuadros)", with lyrics by Marià Golobardas de la Torre. Premiered at the Teatre Tivoli in Barcelona, on Wednesday, November 25, 1925.
- 1928. El aguilón "Zarzuela en dos actos". Libretto by Lluís Capdevila and Pedro Puche. Premiered at the Teatro Arriaga in Bilbao in December 1928 and at the Teatre Victòria in Barcelona on Friday, March 9, 1929.
- 1931. El caballero del mar. "Zarzuela en 2 actos en prosa y verso". Libretto by Adame Martínez and Torrado Estrada. Premiered at the Teatre Novedades in Barcelona on Friday, December 11, 1931.

=== Songs in Catalan ===
- A Montserrat, song with lyrics by E. Morant
- Amor distret, for voice and orchestra
- L'autobús (1919), couplet signed by I. Casamoz, with lyrics by Juan Misterio (Joan Casas i Vila)
- La balladora, song with lyrics by Juan Misterio
- La boletaire (1919), couplet with lyrics by Marià Golobardas
- Campanar nevat, song with lyrics by Joan Maria Guasch
- Cant de joia, for choir
- Corpus, song with lyrics by Joan Maragall
- Cuca de llum (ca 1928), song with lyrics by Joan Maria Guasch
- Dorm, Jesús de Natzaret (1965), for choir
- Enviant flors, for voice and orchestra
- L'escolanet (1919), couplet with lyrics by Vicenç Andrés
- Les garbes dormen al camp, song with lyrics by Josep Maria de Sagarra
- Ha nascut el Redemptor (1965), for choir
- I és el tramvia! (1921), song signed I. Casamoz, with lyrics by Juan Misterio
- El mariner, song with lyrics by Clementina Arderiu
- Nena (1919), couplet with music by I. Casamoz, lyrics by Pedro Puche
- Non, non, nonetes, song with lyrics by Joan Casas i Vila
- Oi que si (1919), fox-trot by 'I. Casamoz and lyrics by Joaquim Montero and J.Misterio
- Per Sant Joan, for choir
- Serenata d'hivern, song with lyrics by Josep Carner
- La solfejadora: si, la, sol, fa, mi, re, do (1919), song by I. Casamoz and lyrics by Joaquim Montero and Josep Aznar
- El torrent (ca 1926), song with lyrics by Lluís Via
- Els Tres Tombs de Sant Anton, lyrics by Juan Misterio
- El vailet (1926), lyrics by Joan Maria Guasch
- Ve i va (ca 1930), song with lyrics by Josep Carner

=== Songs in Spanish ===
- With lyrics by M. Bachonta: El burlado burlador (1918),Caireles, El coronel (1918), El ruiseñor, jota
- With lyrics by Marià Golobardas de la Torre: Como la flor (ca. 1920), Dale al abanico (1919), fox-trot also with lyrics by Josep Aznar, Juguetes de amor (1919), fox-trot, ¿Soltera – Casada? (1919), Soltera, no (1919),
- With lyrics by Antonio Graciani: La galbana: canción antillana (ca. 1920), La misión de España (1919)
- With lyrics by Juan Misterio: Ay mamá (1918), El loco Shimmy (1921), El minero (ca 1925), La Miss de London (ca. 1925)
- With lyrics by Pedro Puche: Rey y señor (ca. 1932), Tu besar (1919), couplet, ¿Volverá? (1919), couplet
- La chilenita, habanera
- Con trompetas y tambores (1963), Christmas carol for mixed choir
- Cuando se quiere de veras (ca 1922), couplet by I. Casamoz
- Djalma: rag-time, oriental fashion (1920), lyrics by Casamoz and Joaquim Montero
- En la noche tranquila (1963), Christmas carol for mixed choir
- Esencia chula, couplet
- La inmensa jota (1917)
- ¡Pobre Dolores! (1919), song with lyrics by Joaquim Montero
- Rosa de nieve, song with lyrics by Eduardo Montesinos
- La tiple ligera (1932), music and lyrics by Zamacois
- Tu boca (ca 1931), song with lyrics by "J. Casamoz"
- El vals del jerez (1913), song with lyrics by Jerónimo Gaid
- Vergonzosa (ca 1925), couplet with lyrics by Pousinet

=== Piano pieces ===
- Aguafuertes (1939), five-piece suite (Pórtico, Becqueriana, Sardana, Ante una invocación pagana, Capricho)
- Elena (1913), masurca dedicated to his mother
- Souvenir de jeunesse, by "J. Casamoz"

=== Sardanes ===
- L'amic Manel (1934)
- Cant de joia (1975)
- Cap d'any (1929)
- El conte de l'avi (1946)
- Diana (1970)
- Figaronenca (1929)
- Irene (1975)
- Margaridó (1975)
- Montigalà (1975)
- Raimon (1970)
- Ricard (1970)
