= Ricardo Zamacois =

Spanish actor & singer (1847–1888)

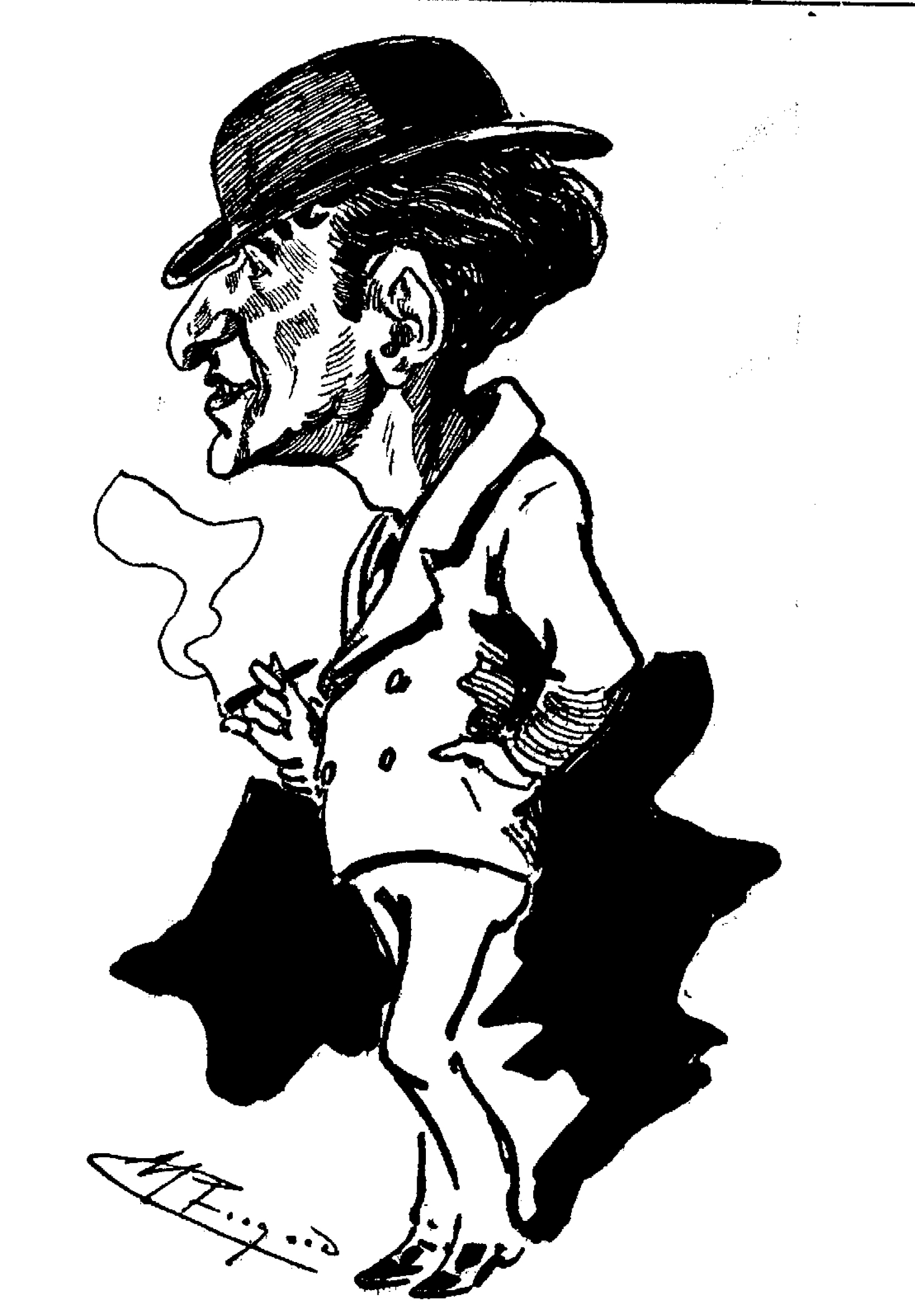
- Ricardo Zamacois; caricature by Manuel Luque (1880)
- Born: Ricardo Melchor Zamacois y Zabala; January 6, 1847; Bilbao, Spain
- Died: February 18, 1888 (aged 41); Barcelona
- Occupations: actor, singer

Ricardo Melchor Zamacois y Zabala (6 January 1847, Bilbao - 18 February 1888, Barcelona) was a Spanish actor and singer. He was half-brother of the historian Niceto de Zamacois, brother of the actress Elisa Zamacois and the painter Eduardo Zamacois y Zabala, and uncle of the writers Miguel Zamacois and Eduardo Zamacois, and the music composer Joaquín Zamacois.

== Biography ==
Ricardo Melchor Zamacois y Zabala was born on 6 January 1847 in Bilbao, son of Miguel Antonio de Zamacois y Berreteaga (1794-1863), a Professor at the Colegio de Humanidades de Vizcaya, and his second wife, Ruperta María del Pilar de Zabala y Arauco. He had several notable relatives. His family surname was originated in the French Basque city of Hasparren, where it was originally spelled "Samacoys".

He studied sculpture and drawing in Paris but, after his father's death, he returned to his family and enrolled at the Real Escuela Superior de Arte Dramático, where he was awarded a gold medal for his work.

Especially gifted for comedy, he began his career at the Café San Isidro in Madrid, where he developed his personal style. By the end of the 1860s, he was performing at the Teatro de la Zarzuela, in a company formed by Emilio Mario and Teodora Lamadrid. Later, he performed at the Teatro de la Comedia, where he was one of the inaugural acts in 1875, and the Teatro Eslava. He was especially well known for his impersonations of notable figures, such as the bullfighter, Frascuelo, and the tenor, Enrico Tamberlik.

He toured the Americas in 1885, in the company of Rafael Calvo Revilla. A year later, he became a Director at the Teatro Lara.

In 1879, he married the actress, Emilia Ballesteros. In 1887, he discovered that she was having an affair. This ultimately led to a suicide attempt. He never fully recovered and was admitted to a mental hospital in Barcelona, where he died early the following year.
