= Elisa Zamacois =

Spanish singer & actress (1838–1915)

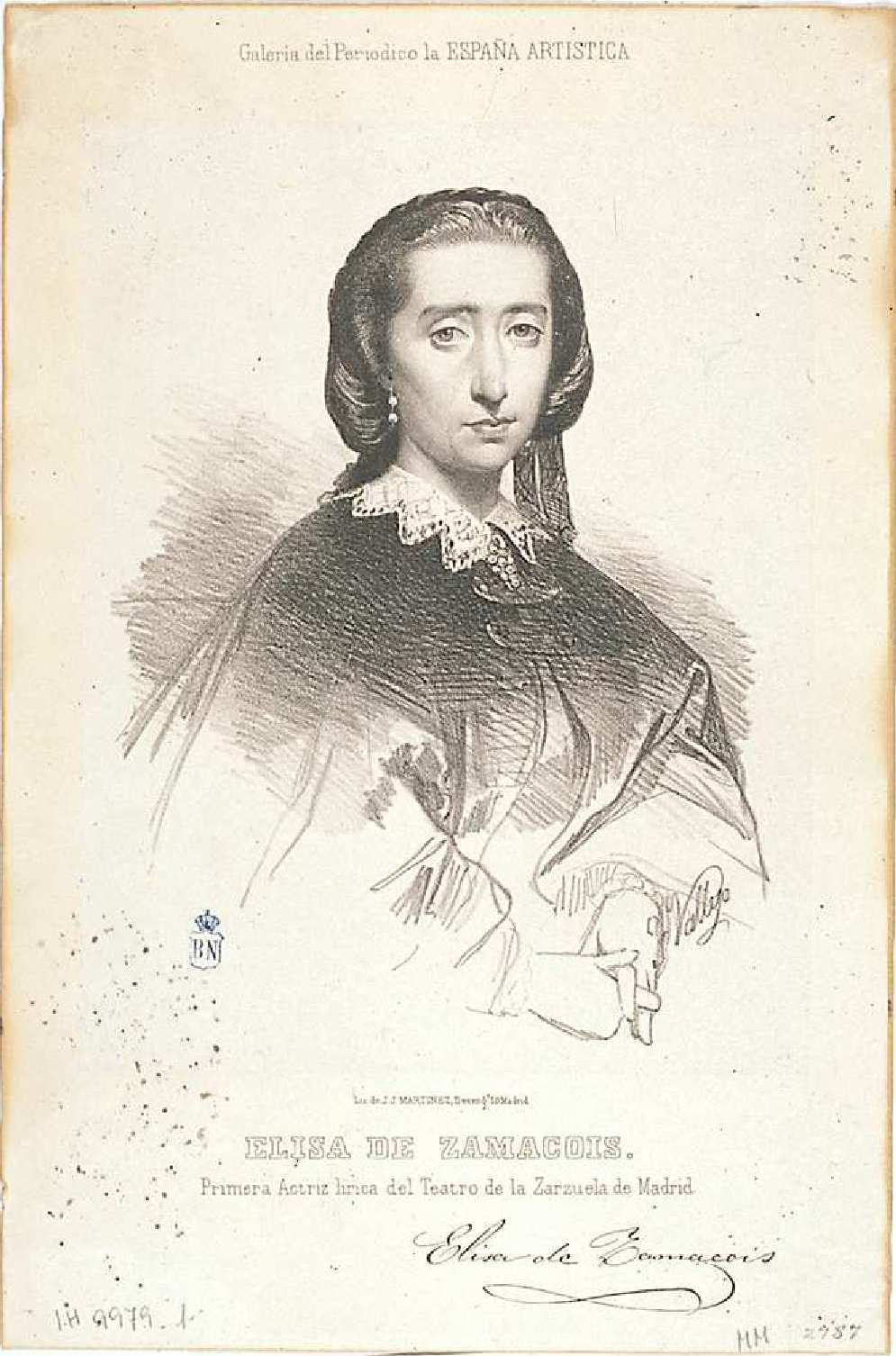
- Elisa Zamacois portrait c. 1850
- Born: Elisa Pedra Zamacois y Zabala; 29 April 1838; Bilbao
- Died: November 1915 (aged 77); Buenos Aires
- Occupations: Singer and actress

Elisa Pedra Zamacois y Zabala (29 April 1838 in Bilbao – November 1915 in Buenos Aires) was a Spanish singer and actress. She was half-sister of the writer Niceto de Zamacois, and sister of the painter Eduardo Zamacois y Zabala, and the actor Ricardo Zamacois, and also was aunt of the writers Miguel Zamacoïs and Eduardo Zamacois, and the music composer Joaquín Zamacois.

== Biography ==
Elisa Pedra Zamacois y Zabala was born on 29 April 1838 in Bilbao, daughter of Miguel Antonio de Zamacois y Berreteaga, and his second wife, Ruperta María del Pilar de Zabala y Arauco.

Her family moved to Madrid, where worked at Teatro de la Zarzuela. She played Galatea in the homonym play along Modesto Landa (Pygmalion), Vicente Caltañazor (Midas) and Emilio Carratalá (Ganymede).

Between 1859 and 1884 she wrote Cartas de Elisa de Zamacois a Francisco A. Barbieri. She was the sister of the actor Ricardo.
