= Niceto de Zamacois =

Spanish journalist (1820–1885)

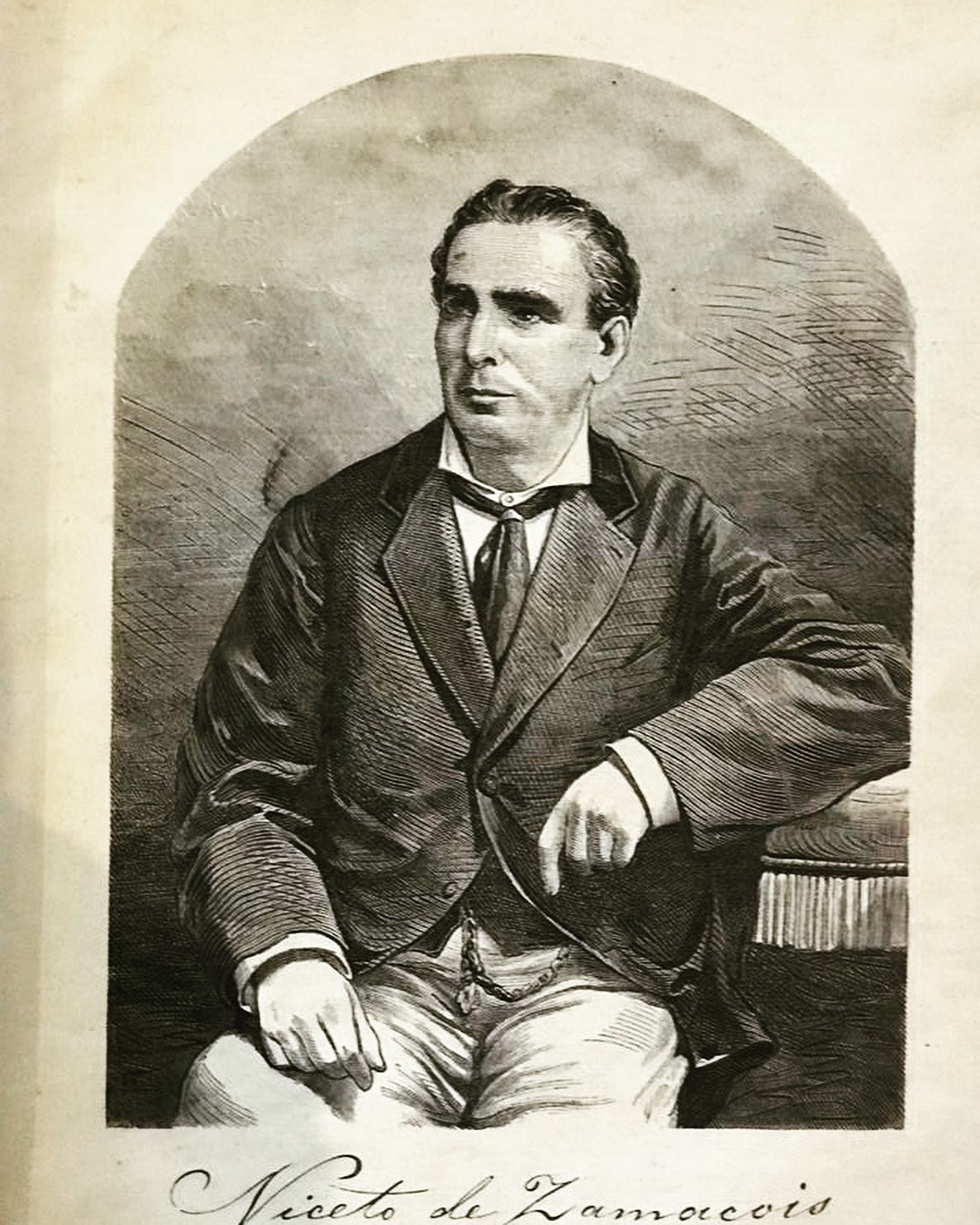
- Born: Juan Niceto de Zamacois y Urrutia; March 20, 1820; Bilbao, Spain
- Died: September 29, 1885 (aged 65); Mexico City, Mexico
- Citizenship: Spain
- Occupation: Writer
- Spouse: María Francisca Rubio y Mateos
- Writing career
- Language: Spanish

Juan Niceto de Zamacois y Urrutia (20 March 1820 in Bilbao – 29 September 1885 in Mexico City) was a Spanish journalist, playwright, poet, novelist and historian resident in Mexico. He was half-brother of the painter Eduardo Zamacois y Zabala, the singer Elisa Zamacois, and the actor Ricardo Zamacois, and also was uncle of the writers Miguel Zamacoïs and Eduardo Zamacois, and the music composer Joaquín Zamacois.

== Biography ==
Juan Niceto de Zamacois y Urrutia was born in Bilbao, Spain. Son of Miguel Antonio de Zamacois y Berreteaga, and his first wife, Juana de Urrutia y Mendiola. His father was the founder and director of the Santiago de Vizcaya School of Humanities. His relatives included numerous artists: writers, actors and musicians. Of family of Basque ancestry, their surname originated in Hasparren, France, where their surname was spelled "Samacoys" at 18th century.

He emigrated to Mexico in 1840, and in 1843 married Mexican María Francisca Rubio y Mateos. He developed almost his entire literary career in Mexico.

In 1857, due to the Mexican political situation, he returned to Spain, but in 1860 he settled newly in Mexico until the First Spanish Republic. Again in Mexico he decides not to become naturalized, so he can not run as a federal deputy.

He died at 65 years, on 29 September 1885 in Mexico City.

== Works ==
=== Theatre ===
- The Yankees in Monterrey, comic sketch in one act and in verse (1846), premiered at the Teatro Santa Anna in July 1846).
- The undersigned, operetta in one act, in prose and verse (1859)
- Inheriting a barber, an act comic sketch (1859), represented in Madrid in Zarzuelaa Theatre on 20 June 1859.
- The two mothers-comedy in one act (1860)
- The mayor, operetta in one act (1861), with music by JE Domec.
- The musician and poet, one-act operetta, prose and verse (1861), with music by F. Caballero.

=== Poetry ===
- Poetic Entertainment (1847)
- The echoes of my lira (1849)
- The mysteries of Mexico, poem written in a variety of meters (1850)
- Health of the soul, prayer book written in verse and variety of meters (1851)
- History of the Carlist War in the Basque provinces and Navarre, epic

=== Novels ===
- The California Gold Digger (1855)
- A dethroned angel from heaven, religious Legend (1855)
- Captain Rossi (1860)
- Syrup (1861)
- Zuisvivir Feeling (1864)
- The beggar of San Angelo (1865)
- Inheriting a barber (1879)

=== Essay ===
- Mexicans themselves painted (1855)
- Mexico and its surroundings (1855–1856)
- Testament "The Pythagorean Gallo", satirical, humorous, critical, mocking and laughing, written warning to rogues and honest rejoicing (1855)
- Almanac comic, critical, satirical and burlesque, for all ages, men and countries (1856)

=== Translations ===
- The Last Days of Pompeii by Edward Bulwer Lytton (The Last Days of Pompeii, 1871)

=== History ===
- History of Mexico (1876–1882)
