= Eduardo Zamacois =

Cuban-Spanish novelist and journalist

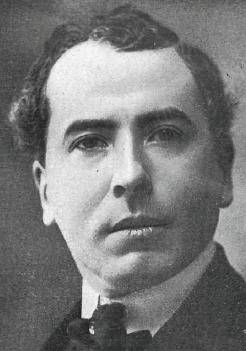
- Eduardo Zamacois (c.1910)
- Born: Eduardo María Zamacois y Quintana; February 17, 1873; Pinar del Río, Cuba
- Died: December 31, 1971 (aged 98); Buenos Aires, Argentina
- Occupation: Writer
- Spouses: Cándida Díaz y Sánchez (m. 1895–1933) Matilde Olimpia Fernández y Fuertes (m. 1956–1971)
- Children: 3, including Gloria Zamacois
- Writing career
- Pen name: Eduardo Zamacois
- Language: Spanish

Eduardo Zamacois y Quintana (17 February 1873 – 31 December 1971) was a Cuban-Spanish novelist and journalist. A leading figure of the boom of short novel collections in Spain, and a representative of the bohemian literary scene in the country, he spent a substantial part of his life in Paris and, following the end of the Spanish Civil War, exiled in the Americas.

== Biography ==
Eduardo María Zamacois y Quintana was born on 17 February 1873 in "La Ceiba" estate, near Pinar del Río, Cuba, the only son of Spanish Pantaleón Zamacois y Urrutia (a Basque migrant to Cuba) and Victoria Quintana y González (a native Cuban). His father's relatives included numerous artists: writers, actors and musicians. He was nephew of Spanish writer Niceto de Zamacois, the singer Elisa Zamacois, the painter Eduardo Zamacois y Zabala, and the actor Ricardo Zamacois, and also was cousin of the French writer Miguel Zamacoïs and the music composer Joaquín Zamacois.

At 4 years, he left Cuba with his parents, and they lived briefly in Brussels and Paris before settling in Madrid. He also studied in Sevilla.

Leaving college to pursue literature, his first fiction was erotic, but realistic in its depictions of ordinary life. Persuaded by his mother, he married Cándida Díaz y Sánchez on 7 November 1895 in Madrid. But he had numerous lovers and preferred to live in Paris. He had two daughters, Gloria born in 1897, and Elisa born in 1898, and a son Fernando.

As journalist, he edited El Cuento Semanal and Los Contemporáneos, and, from 1897, worked for the weekly Germinal. Later he moved to Barcelona to write for El Gato Negro and ¡Ahí Va! before founding Vida Galante.

From 1905 it took a socialistic form as he grew to sympathise with the Republican cause. During World War I he lived in France, working as a correspondent for La Tribune. He returned to Spain and continued to write prolifically until the outbreak of the Spanish Civil War.

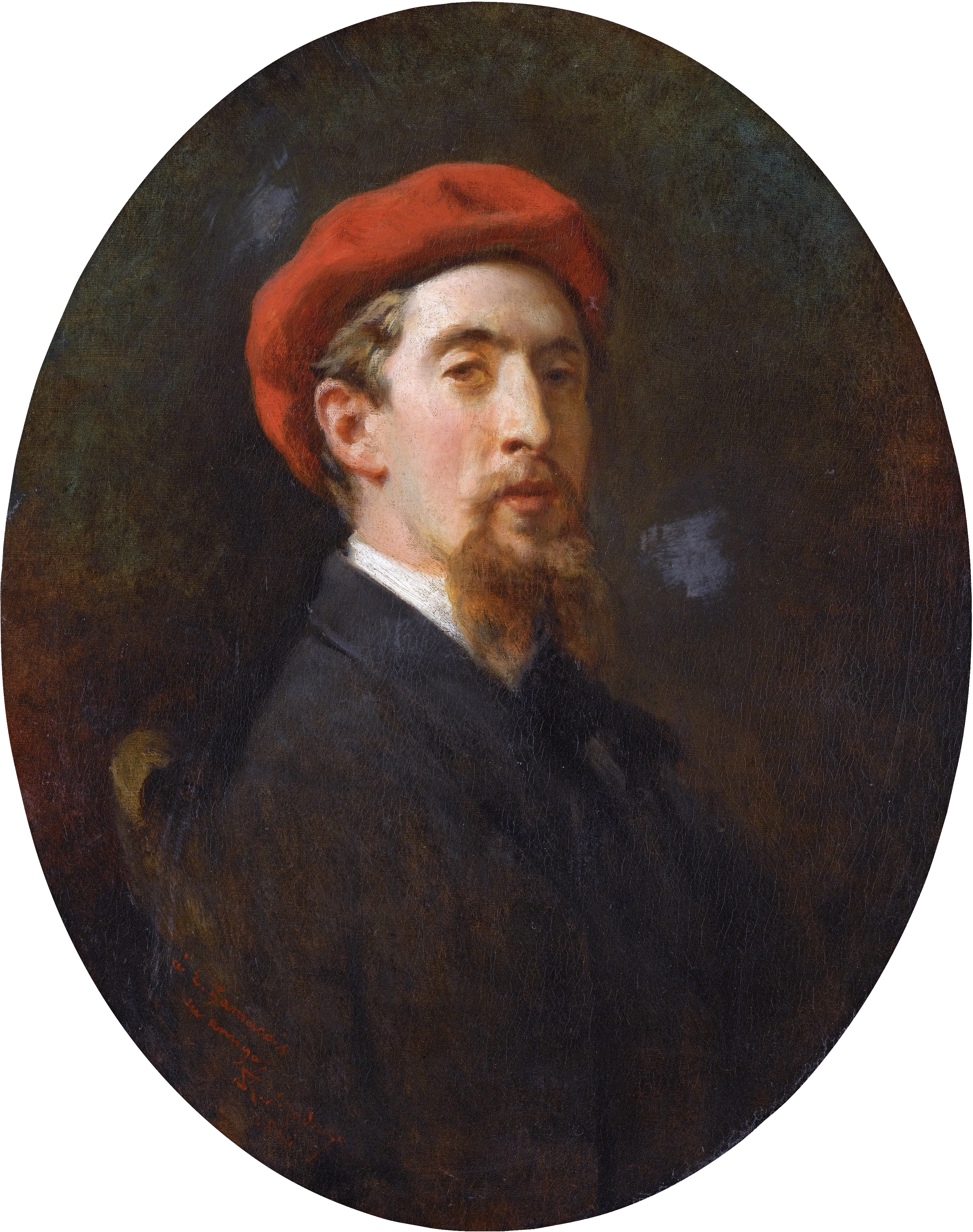
Eduardo De Zamacois (1864) by Spanish artist Raimundo de Madrazo y Garreta

During the war Zamacois was a war correspondent, first in Madrid and since 1937 in Valencia and Barcelona, where he published El asedio de Madrid ("The Siege of Madrid", 1938). In early January 1939 the republican Barcelona tribunal sentenced him to 6 years of imprisonment for defeatism, presented in his novels. It is not clear whether he was incarcerated, as he may have benefited from an amnesty declared for all prisoners over sixty years of age shortly before his sentence was passed. In any case, after the fall of Barcelona he was able to flee to France, and then to the US and Mexico, before settling in Argentina, where he eventually wrote his memoirs, Un hombre que se va... (1964).

His first wife died in 1933, and in 1956 he remarried his long-time lover, the Cuban Matilde Olimpia Fernández y Fuertes.

He died at 98, on 31 December 1971 in Buenos Aires. He is buried in Madrid.

== Bibliography ==
- El misticismo y las perturbaciones del sistema nervioso (1893).
- Amar a oscuras (1894).
- La enferma (1895).
- Humoradas en prosa (1896).
- Consuelo (1896)
- Punto negro (1897)
- Vértigos (1899)
- Incesto (1900)
- Horas crueles (1901)
- El seductor (1902)
- Memorias de una cortesana (1904)
- Sobre el abismo (1905)
- Río abajo: almas, paisajes, perfiles perdidos. Madrid: Pueyo, 1905.
- El otro (1910)
- Teatro galante (1910)
- Desde mi butaca (1911)
- Crimen sin rastro (1911)
- Europa se va... (1913)
- La opinión ajena (1913).
- Del camino (1913).
- La cita (novelas cortas) (1913).
- El misterio de un hombre pequeñito (1914).
- La ola de plomo (1915).
- Años de miseria y risa (1916).
- Las confesiones de un niño decente (1916).
- Presentimiento (1916).
- La carreta de Thespis (1918).
- La alegría de andar (1920).
- Memorias de un vagón de ferrocarril (1922).
- La bobina maravillosa (1922).
- Una vida extraordinaria (1923).
- Una pobre vida (1924).
- Las raíces (1927), trilogía novelística.
- Los vivos muertos (1929)
- La risa, la carne y la muerte (1930), selección de cuentos.
- El delito de todos (1933)
- La antorcha apagada (1935).
- Tipos de café, segunda edición (1935)
- Don Juan hace economías, (1936), farsa grotesca.
- Crónicas de la guerra (1937)
- El asedio de Madrid (1938)
- Un hombre que se va... Memorias (1964)
- El teatro por dentro
