= Jean Alfred Marioton =

French painter (1863–1903)

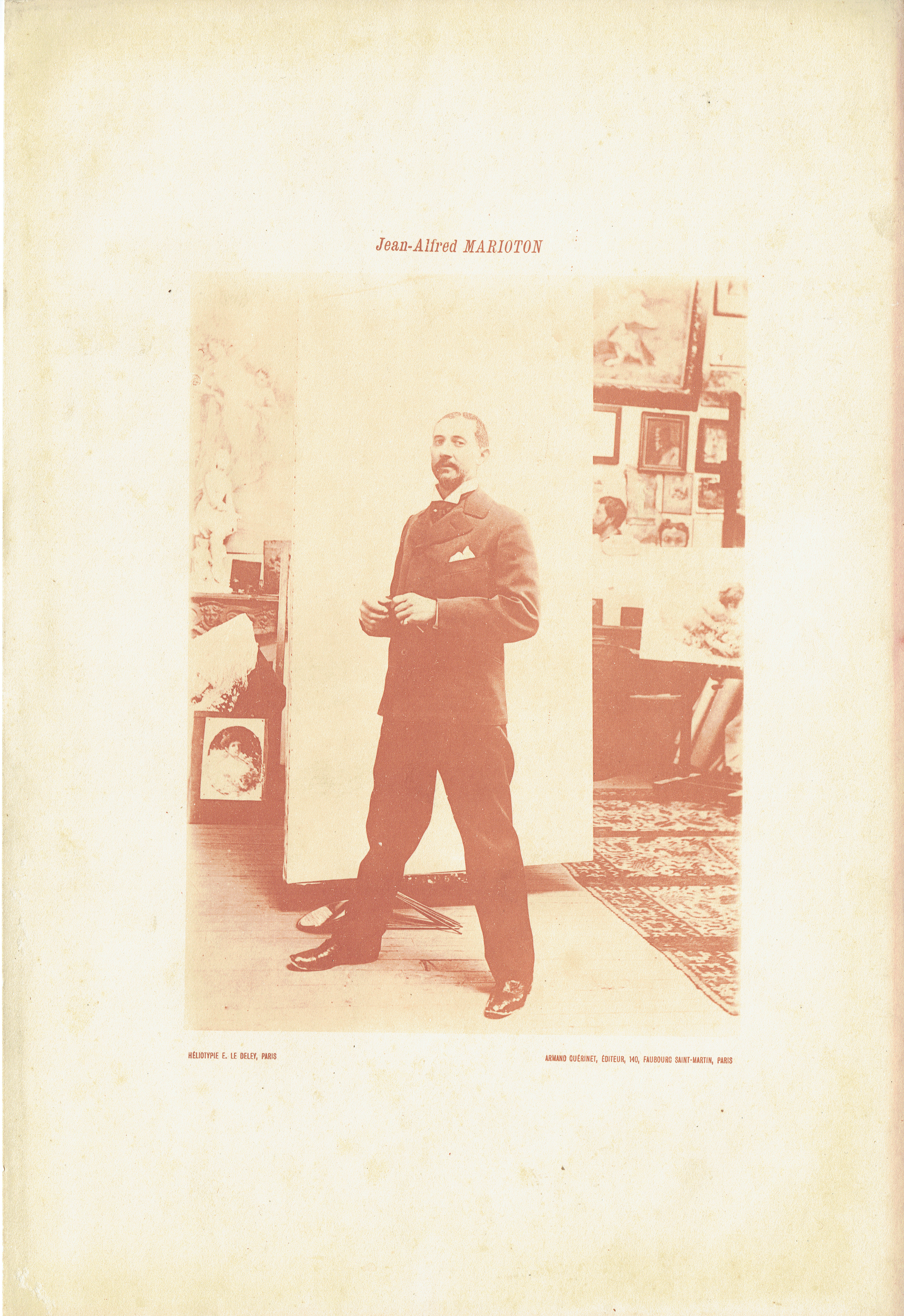
Jean-Alfred Marioton

Jean Alfred Marioton (3 September 1863, Paris – 6 April 1903, Paris) was a French painter. His brothers Claudius and Eugène were both sculptors.

In 1887 Marioton won second prize in the Prix de Rome with his painting The Death of Themistocles.
