= Jean-Alfred =

Jean-Alfred is a French masculine given name. Notable people with the name include:

== People ==
- Jean-Alfred Gautier (1793–1881), Swiss astronomer
- Jean-Alfred Villain-Marais, known professionally as Jean Marais (1913–1998), French actor, director, painter, photographer, sculptor, visual artist and writer

== See also ==
- Al Jean (born 1961; born Alfred Ernest Jean III), American screenwriter and producer
- Alfred Assollant (1827–1886; born Jean-Baptiste-Alfred Assollant), French author, journalist and activist
- Alfred Cluysenaar (1837–1902), Belgian painter
- Alfred Jean Baptiste Lemaire (1842–1907), French military musician and composer
- Alfred Jean Garnier (1848–1908), French painter and enameller
- Alfred Jean Halou (1875–1939), French sculptor
- Alfred Jean-Marie Paris (1848–1908), French painter, illustrator and lithographer
- Alfred Perot (1863–1925; born Jean-Baptiste Alfred Perot), French physicist
- Alfred Ubbelohde (1907–1988; third name Jean), Belgian-born English physical chemist
- Jean Alfred (1940–2015), Haitian-born Canadian politician
- Jean Alfred Fournier (1832–1914), French dermatologist
- Jean Alfred Fraissinet (1894–1981), French military personnel
- Jean Alfred Gagné (1842–1910) Canadian judge, lawyer, merchant an politician
- Jean Alfred Marioton (1863–1903), French painter
- Jean de Chabannes la Palice (1871–1933; second name Alfred), French sailor
- Jean-François Bayard (1796–1853; middle name Alfred), French playwright
- Léon Vleurinck (1899–1982; second and third names Jean Alfred), Belgian rower
- Marie-Alfred de Suin (1796–1861; born Marie-Jean-Baptiste-Alfred de Suin), French admiral
- Maurice Yans (1914—1983; second and third names Jean Alfred), Belgian historian and archivist
- JA (disambiguation)
