= Grandhomme =

Grandhomme or de Grandhomme is a surname that has its origins in France and is derived from the Old French term "grand homme" which translates to "great man" or "tall man". Notable people with this surname include:

== Grandhomme ==
- Friedrich Wilhelm Grandhomme (1834–1907), German artist (de:Friedrich Wilhelm Grandhomme)
- Paul Grandhomme (1851–1944), French medalist, engraver and enameller

== de Grandhomme ==
- Colin de Grandhomme (born 1986), Zimbabwean-born-New Zealand cricketer
- Laurence de Grandhomme (1956–2017), Zimbabwean cricketer
