= Spring of hearts =

1904 painting by Nasreddine Dinet

Le Printemps des cœurs
- Spring of hearts (English)
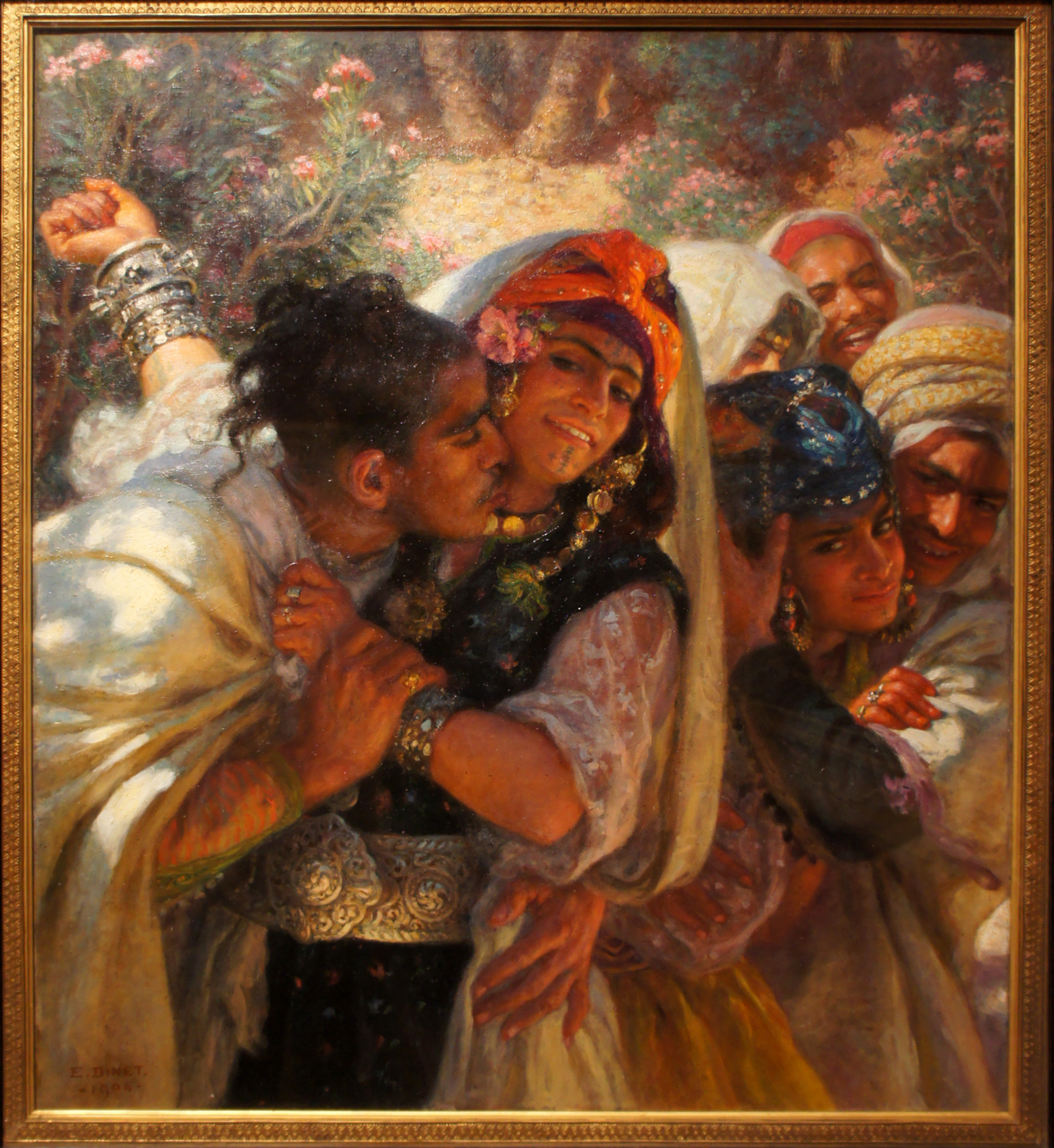
- Artist: Nasreddine Dinet
- Year: 1904
- Medium: Oil-on-canvas
- Dimensions: 94,5 cm × 83,5 cm (372 in × 329 in)
- Location: Museum of Fine Arts, Reims, Reims

Spring of hearts (French: Le Printemps des cœurs) is a genre painting created in 1904, by the French artist Nasreddine Dinet.

== Description ==
Spring of hearts is an oil painting created in Algeria by the painter Nasreddine Dinet. It has been housed at Museum of Fine Arts in Reims since 1907, following the bequest of collector Henry Vasnier to the city of Reims.

In the early 1900s, Nasreddine Dinet translated and illustrated a book by his friend Sliman ben Ibrahim titled Rabiâ el Kouloub or Springtime of Hearts a collection of Saharan legends. This painting draws inspiration from the themes of the work. Three nomadic couples, dressed in traditional attire, embrace, kiss, and smile, following one another as if in a dance amidst a lush green setting adorned with blooming oleanders ·.

== See also ==
- Orientalism
