= Bunny de Grandhomme =

Rhodesian cricketer

Personal information
- Full name: Hilary Laurence de Grandhomme
- Born: 5 August 1926; Livingstone, Northern Rhodesia
- Died: 21 June 2002 (aged 75); Durban, South Africa
- Batting: Right-handed
- Bowling: Right-arm offbreak, right-arm medium
- Relatives: Laurence de Grandhomme (nephew); Colin de Grandhomme (great-nephew)

Domestic team information
- Years: Team
- 1946/47–1949/50: Rhodesia

Career statistics
Competition	FC
Matches	4
Runs scored	75
Batting average	9.37
100s/50s	0/0
Top score	28
Balls bowled	72
Wickets	0
Bowling average	–
5 wickets in innings	0
10 wickets in match	0
Best bowling	–
Catches/stumpings	4–
- Source: Cricinfo, 29 December 2024

Hilary Laurence "Bunny" de Grandhomme (5 August 1926 – 21 June 2002) was a Rhodesian first-class cricketer who played four first-class matches for Rhodesia in the 1940s.

De Grandhomme was part of the Rhodesia team that played a tour game against the touring Australian team in Bulawayo in November 1949. His nephew Laurence de Grandhomme also played first-class cricket matches in Zimbabwe and his great-nephew Colin de Grandhomme went on to play for New Zealand in international cricket.

== See also ==
- List of Rhodesian representative cricketers
