= On the Terraces. Laghouat by Moonlight =

1897 painting by Nasreddine Dinet

Sur les terrasses. Clair de lune à Laghouat
- On the Terraces. Laghouat by Moonlight (English)
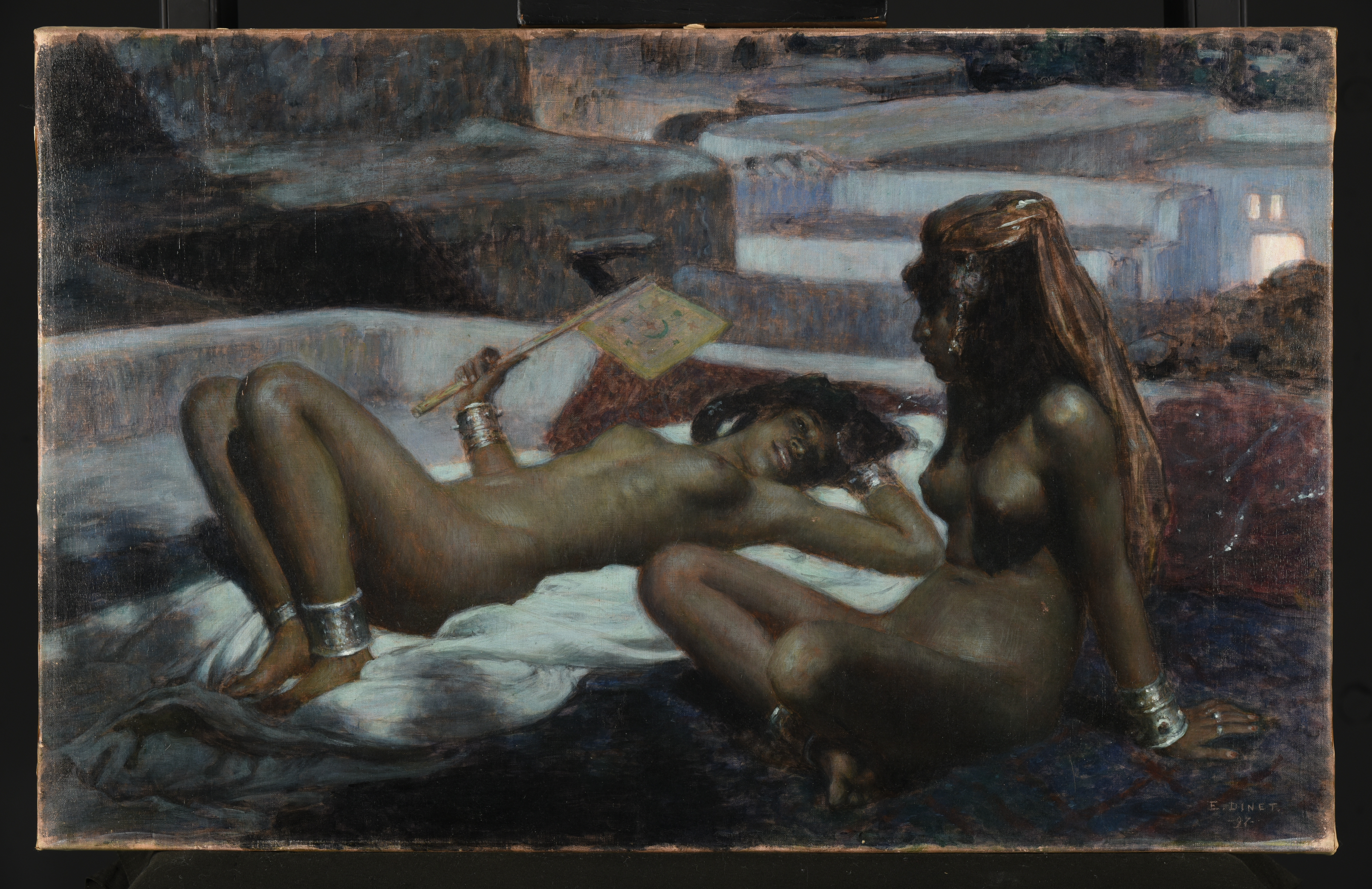
- Artist: Nasreddine Dinet
- Year: 1897
- Medium: Oil-on-canvas
- Dimensions: 46,5 cm × 72,5 cm (183 in × 285 in)
- Location: Museum of Fine Arts, Reims, Reims

On the Terraces. Laghouat by Moonlight (French: Sur les terrasses. Clair de lune à Laghouat) is a genre painting created in 1897, by the French artist Nasreddine Dinet.

== Description ==
On the Terraces. Laghouat by Moonlight is an oil painting created in Algeria by the painter Nasreddine Dinet. It has been housed at Museum of Fine Arts in Reims since 1907, following the bequest of collector Henry Vasnier to the city of Reims.

On the roof of a house in Laghouat, at night, two Algerian women, nude, wearing jewelry; one lying down, a fan in her right hand; the other sitting, leaning back on her hands, wearing a headdres. At the time, the scene fit into the Western myth of the women in Algeria. However, the subject of young women resting naked on a terrace raises questions about the scene's authenticity, given that Nasreddine Dinet used prostitutes as models ·.

In 2024, the painting is being presented among the works in the exhibition Nasreddine Dinet, Algerian Passions at the Institut du monde arabe.

== See also ==
- Orientalism
