= The Swing (Dinet) =

1899 painting by Nasreddine Dinet

La Balançoire
- The Swing (English)
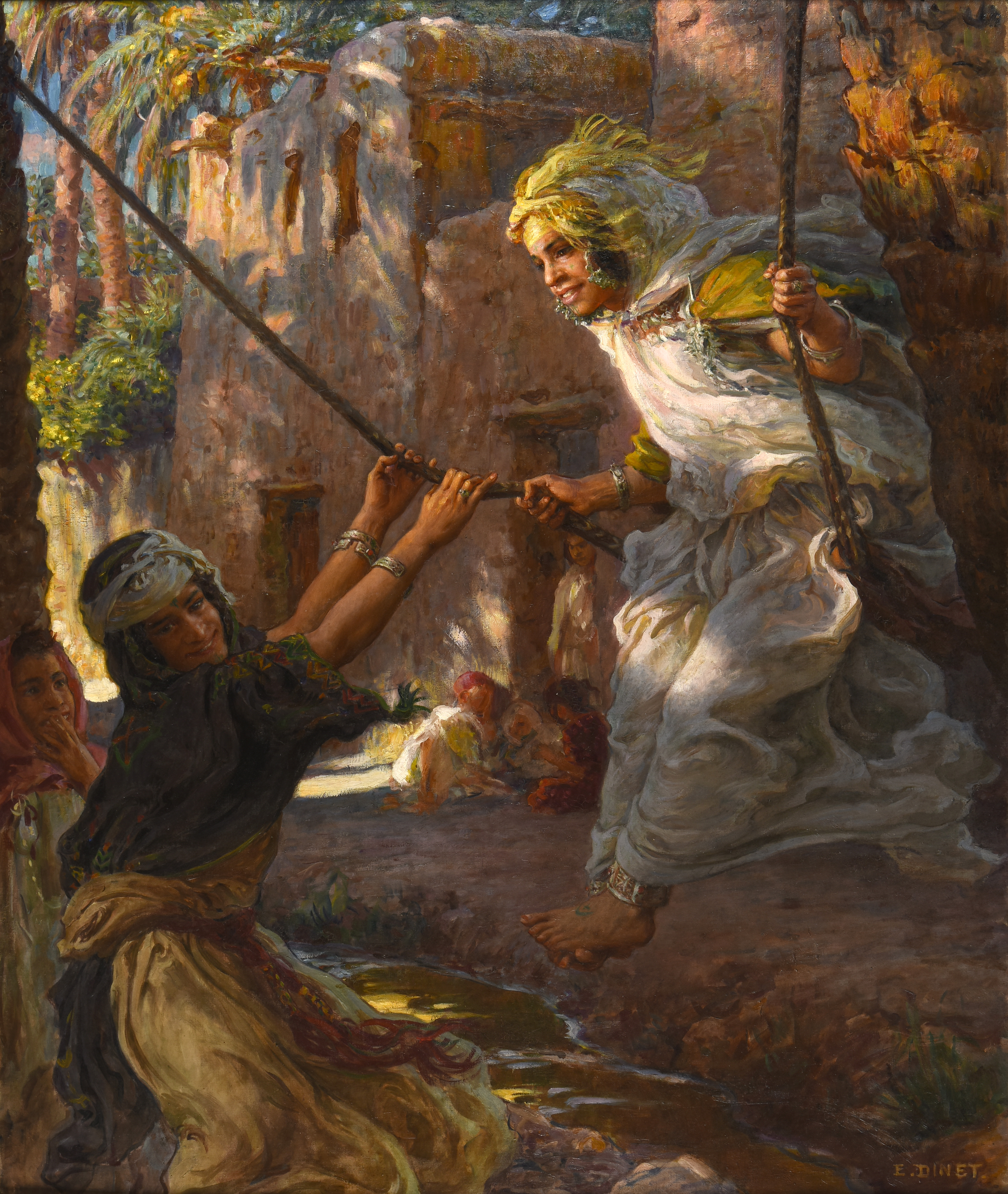
- Artist: Nasreddine Dinet
- Year: 1899
- Medium: Oil-on-canvas
- Dimensions: 130,6 cm × 109,7 cm (514 in × 432 in)
- Location: Museum of Fine Arts, Reims, Reims

The Swing (French: La Balançoire) is a genre painting created in 1899, by the French artist Nasreddine Dinet.

== Description ==
The Swing is an oil painting, carried out in Biskra, by Nasreddine Dinet, in 1899. It has been housed at the Museum of Fine Arts in Reims since 1907, following its bequest to the city of Reims by the collector Henry Vasnier, who had purchased the painting in 1900 for the sum of 3,000 francs.

The painting depicts two young girls on a swing, descendants of the Ouled Naïl, an Arab tribe settled notably in Biskra and Bou Saâda.

== See also ==
- Orientalism
