= Henry Vasnier =

French wine merchant and art collector (1832-1907)

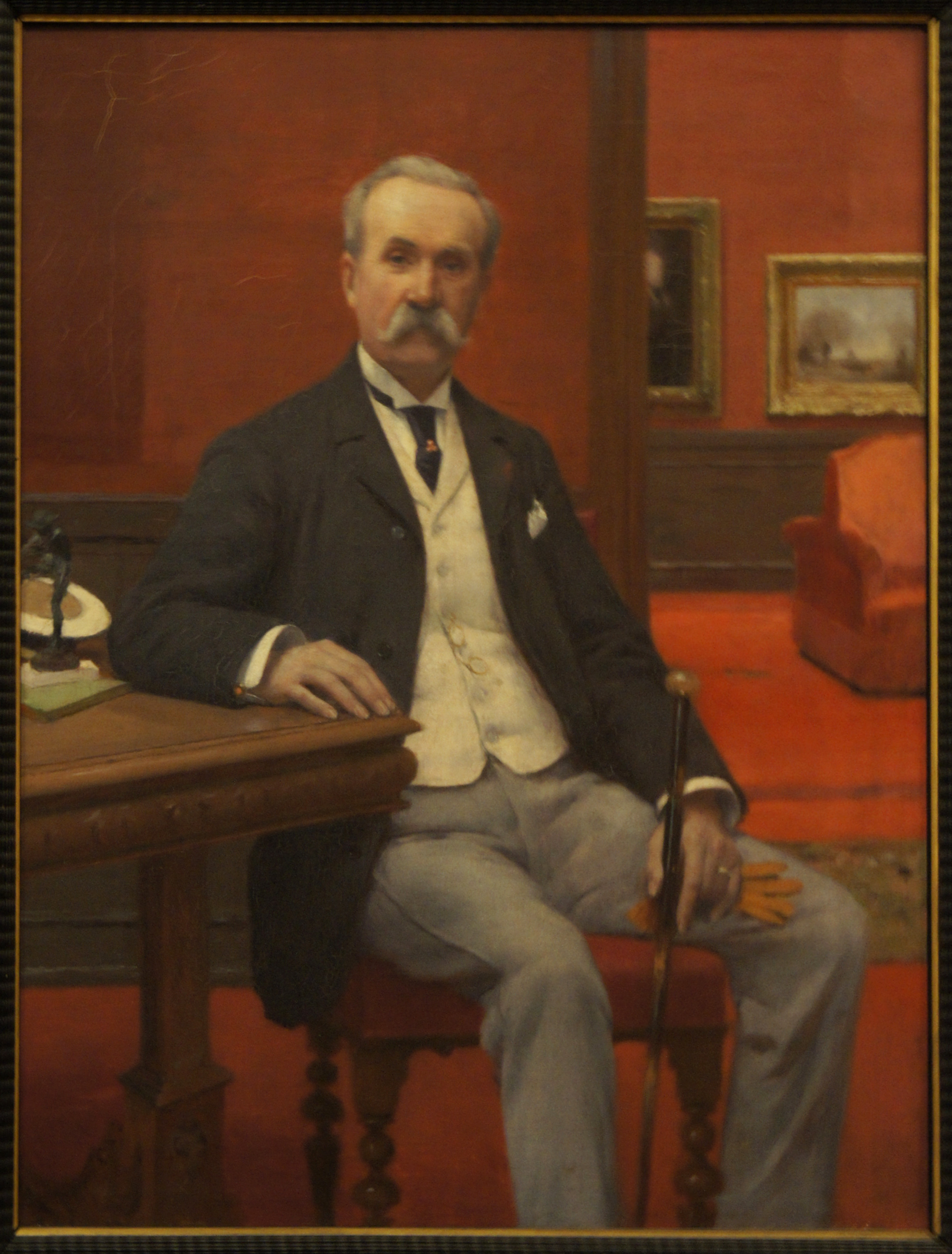
- Born: 1832 April 28; Paris
- Died: 1907 February 28; Reims
- Burial place: Reims
- Occupation: Art collector

Henry Vasnier (1832–1907), born April 28, 1832, in Paris and died February 28, 1907, in Reims (Marne), was a wine merchant associated with the Maison Veuve Pommery, fils et Cie. A major collector at the end of the 19th century, he bequeathed his works to the city of Reims on his death in 1907, considerably enriching its collections and forming the core of the future Musée des Beaux-Arts.

== Biographie ==
Henry Vasnier was born into a bourgeois family in Paris on April 28, 1832. His father, Félix Joseph Dominique Vasnier (1788–1845), was a maître d'hôtel, and his mother, Anne-Marie Caroline Auger, the daughter of a merchant. He was one of three siblings, along with his brother Edmond and sister Clémence.

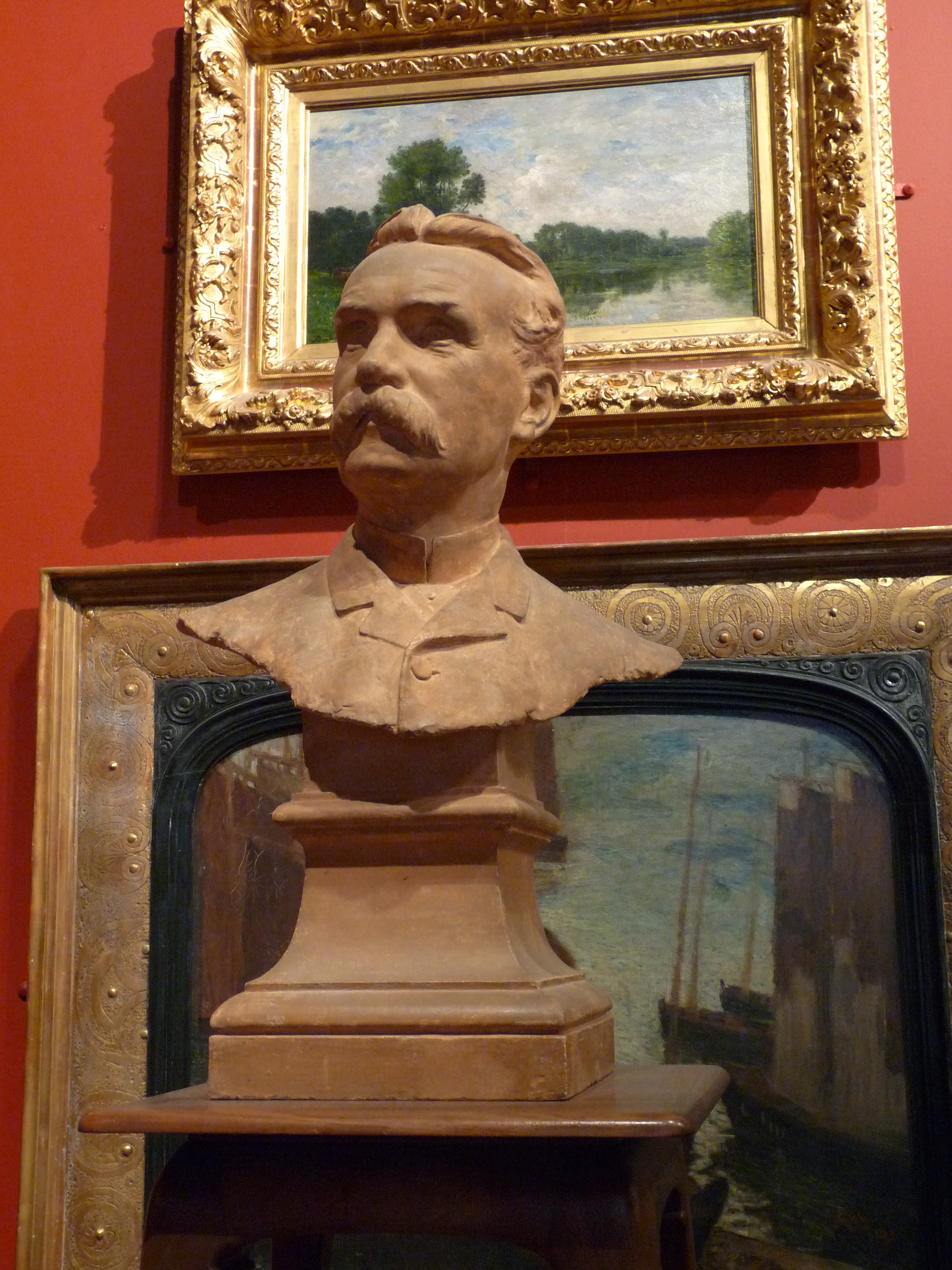
Bust of Henry Vasnier by Léon Chavalliaud (Reims, Museum of Fine Arts).

He began his career as a banker in London. In 1856, he moved to Reims at the request of Alexandre Louis Pommery, the husband of Jeanne Alexandrine Louise Melin (1819–1890), with whom his sister Clémence Vasnier had boarded in Paris. At the age of twenty-four, Henry Vasnier joined the Champagne wine business that Alexandre Louis Pommery had just taken over with Narcisse Greno. On Alexandre Louis Pommery's death in February 1858, Henry Vasnier became the main collaborator of his widow Jeanne Pommery. On July 1, 1885, he went into partnership with Jeanne Pommery and her children. On her death on March 18, 1890, he took over effective management of the Champagne house.

He is described as a level-headed man "imbued with a sense of reality". With the deployment of his fortune, he was able to own several properties, including 1,892 hectares around Reims dedicated to his hunting.

He died of an embolism on February 28, 1907, at the age of seventy-four. His funeral took place at Saint-André church on March 4, 1907. He bequeathed his art collection to the city of Reims, forming the embryo of the city's Musée des Beaux-Arts collection. He donated 100,000 francs to enable the museum to be set up in the former Saint-Denis abbey.

On his death, his collection of works and objets d'art (including works by Corot) was bequeathed to the musée des Beaux-Arts de Reims in the "Bequest Vasnier". However, following a testamentary interpretation, certain pieces were excluded from the bequest and dispersed, including the famous "dining room" created for him by Nancy glassmaker Émile Gallé between 1891 and 1894, and surely one of the artist's masterpieces. These included the "Chemins d'automne" sideboard, the "aux herbes potagères" table, the "fleurs d'avril" table and a series of twelve chairs. These pieces were sold at auction in 1974 by maitre Maurice Rheims at the Hôtel Drouot in Paris.

During the construction of the dining room between 1891 and 1894, relations between Gallé and Vasnier were strained, with the bill for delivery almost double the initial estimate and the delay considerable.

The correspondence between the two men clearly reveals the balance of power.

The Musée des Beaux-Arts de Reims recently acquired the dining room thanks to private and public sponsorship. It is now open to the public in the main hall on the first floor.

The museum also has Gallé's own descriptive booklet, as well as several major pieces of glassware that belonged to Henry Vasnier (the Divines Ramées vermeils fruit globes).

His libertine temperament led him to build a brothel and a saloon called La Californie near the village of Craonne in Picardy. He also built a zoo and an exotic plant park. He had vines planted on the slopes to expand the Pommery estate (the Champagne zone was not defined at the time). The plateau is still known today as the plateau de Californie.

== Henry Vasnier's collection ==
Henry Vasnier's fortune as a wine merchant enabled him to build up a remarkable collection of works by 19th-century artists. These included paintings by Louise Abbéma, Eugène Boudin, Jean-Charles Cazin, Camille Corot, Albert Dammouse, Honoré Daumier, Eugène Delacroix, Émile Gallé, Henri Harpignies, Charles Léandre, Léon Lhermitte, Maxime Maufra, Jean-François Millet, Claude Monet, Camille Pissarro, Pierre-Auguste Renoir, Théodore Rousseau and Alfred Sisley. In addition to paintings, Henry Vasnier also acquired graphic arts, sculptures and objets d'art.

Around 1863, when he was in his thirties, Henry Vasnier began acquiring works. His first purchase was a landscape by Léon-Charles Flahaut, Paysage à Magny-les-Hameaux, shown at the Paris Salon, for 600 francs. His purchases continued to favor this pictorial genre. Attentive to various artistic events, he continued to expand and enrich his collection, particularly from the 1870s onwards. Henry Vasnier made his acquisitions at several key establishments in the Paris art market, such as Hôtel Drouot, which represented an essential source for the enrichment of his collection. He also frequents the French Salons, takes part in auctions, and completed his purchases with dealers such as Georges Petit and Paul Durand-Ruel, from whom he bought Camille Pissarro's painting "L'Avenue de l'Opéra" in 1902. In this way, he built up a rich collection that was highly representative of his era. His acquisitions also testify to his professional success.

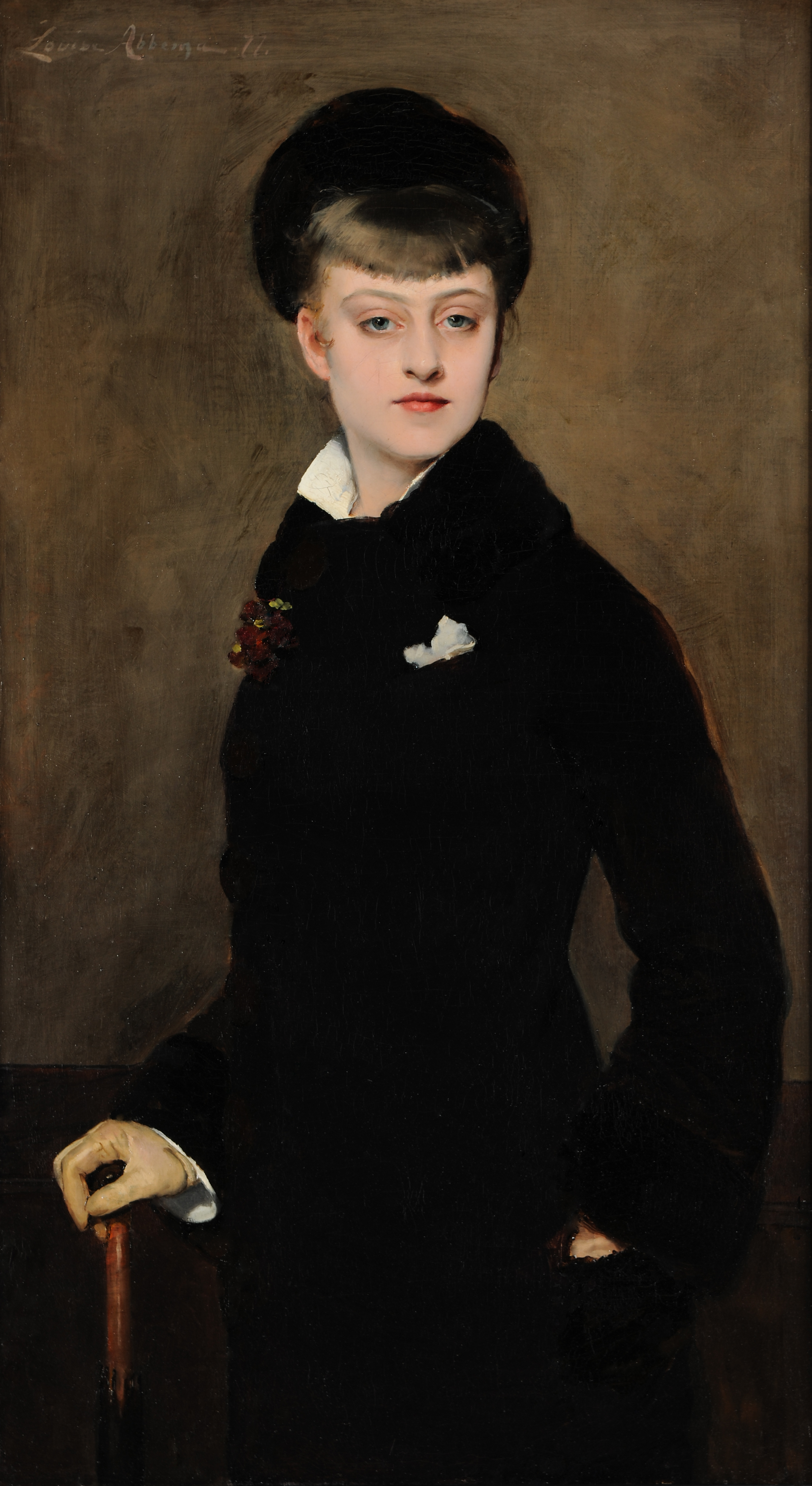
Louise Abbéma, L'Hiver or Portrait of Renée Delmas, 1877, oil on canvas, 100.5 x 56.2 cm, Reims, Museum of Fine Art

In 1877, he bought L'Hiver by Louise Abbéma at the Salon de Reims.

From 1881 onwards, he intensified his acquisitions, filling his apartment on rue Vauthier-le-Noir. In just a few years, his collection grew considerably, from two hundred to three hundred and sixty-two works. Most of his purchases were made in Paris, giving him access to more expensive works. In 1888, he acquired a drawing by Jean-François Millet, Le Repas au milieu du jour, for 12,000 francs and Le Hameau Cousin à Greville for 50,000 francs, which he bought jointly with Jeanne Pommery. In 1890, on Vasnier's advice, the latter bought Millet's painting "Les Glaneuses" for 300,000 gold francs, with the ambition of donating it to the French state. She donated it to the Musée du Louvre the same year.

In the 1880s, he was a regular visitor to the Georges Petit gallery, which had opened in 1882 on rue de Sèze. The decoration of the gallery's rooms was inspired by the Opéra Garnier. Drawings were displayed in imposing molded frames in the style of paintings. Vasnier acquired his works from Georges Petit with confidence, notably at exhibitions organized by the Société des Aquarellistes français and the Société des Pastellistes français. For his purchases at public auction, he also relied on the catalogs published by the dealer, whose reputation was a guarantee.

In 1890, he moved out of his apartment on rue Vauthier-le-Noir and into a private mansion at 72 boulevard Lundy, "filled with remarkable paintings that made a veritable museum". He set up a gallery of paintings, inspired by that of the art dealer Georges Petit. His 88-metre-long gallery, known to photographers, allowed him to apply the latest museographic techniques, with which the collector was familiar. He subsequently extended his acquisitions to include objets d'art and furniture, and became a patron of Emile Gallé. Prince Alain de Polignac spoke of it at the French Architects' Congress in June 1896: "You get back in your car, drive around the city along the Boulevards, and stop in front of a hotel. Mr. Vasnier, director of the Maison Veuve Pommery, who had received us a moment ago in the cellars, honors us with a very remarkable museum he has created. The eye recreates itself admiring the Delacroixes, the Ziems, the Daubignys, the Friants, the Monets and so on. It's the fireworks at the end of this beautiful day".

From 1900, on the advice of Jeanne Pommery, Henry Vasnier turned resolutely to the decorative arts.He already knew Émile Gallé, from whom he had commissioned a dining room in 1891.At the Universal Exhibition in 1900, Vasnier acquired several items of Gallé tableware.He also bought works by artists Ernest Chaplet, Albert Dammouse, Paul Grandhomme and Jules Brateau.These early acquisitions of objets d'art show a diversity of techniques: ceramics, enamel, metal, glassware.They also demonstrate Vasnier's early support for Art Nouveau.

Henry Vasnier's tastes, directed towards artists with established reputations such as Millet, were in line with the aesthetics favored by the bourgeois society that frequented the salons under the Second Empire and the Third Republic.Henry Vasnier's collection was eclectic both in its choice of artists and in the subjects it addressed. However, there was a particular attraction to the landscape genre, to portraiture to a lesser extent, and to the graphic arts. He seems to have preferred works that do not illustrate the new aesthetic trends that marked the dawn of the 20th century. Nevertheless, the collection provides an insight into this collector's taste, and thus into the taste of his time.

Henry Vasnier also owned a large collection of arms, bequeathing his collection of modern hunting and shooting weapons to Louis Pommery, Jeanne Pommery's son, and his collection of antique weapons (swords, daggers, harquebuses, a Russian hunting rifle dating from 1750, Japanese sabres and daggers, etc.6) to the Marquis Melchior de Polignac.

=== A taste for drawing ===
Drawings are a defining feature of the Vasnier collection. Following in the footsteps of 18th-century collectors, who considered the drawing a finished work in itself, Vasnier had a taste for fine leaves, preferably from prestigious sources. The portraits, landscapes, genre scenes and depictions of rural life that caught his eye all had in common a perfectly mastered technique. Certain artists stand out with a majority of works in the graphic art collection, notably Antoine Calbet with eight watercolors, Léon Lhermitte with seven pastels, and Jean-François Millet with five pastels. We also note Vasnier's interest in watercolor and pastel, which are the techniques found in greatest number in his graphic art collection. The collector is also notable for his decision to display his drawings almost systematically in his private mansion, rather than keeping them in portfolios for the solitary hobby of amateurs.

In Vasnier's interiors, graphic works stand side by side with paintings, with no hierarchy and identical framing, signalling the importance accorded to this medium by the collector.

=== Landscapes in the Vasnier collection ===
Victor Diancourt (1825–1910), mayor of Reims from 1872 to 1881 and president of the Société des Amis des Arts et des Musées, said of Henry Vasnier in 1909, a few years before the opening of the Musée des Beaux-Arts: "His preference was for landscapes, particularly those by Camille Corot, of whom he owned six paintings at successive periods in his career. He also sought out Boudin, Jongkind and Harpignies, whose incipient glory he seems to have foreseen that time would consecrate".

The collector favored nineteenth-century landscape painting, keeping his distance from young artists considered a posteriori to be the avant-garde. In the last decades of the 19th century, particularly under the Third Republic, landscapes were increasingly collected, especially by the bourgeoisie, as demonstrated by the attraction for Impressionist landscapes that gradually took hold thanks to the support of art dealers. At the same time, Jean-François Millet's rural landscapes featuring peasant figures were fetching increasingly high prices, as demonstrated by Henry Vasnier's purchase of the pastel Berger gardant son troupeau à l'automne, sold for 400 francs in 1866 and bought for 29,600 francs by Henry Vasnier in 1890.

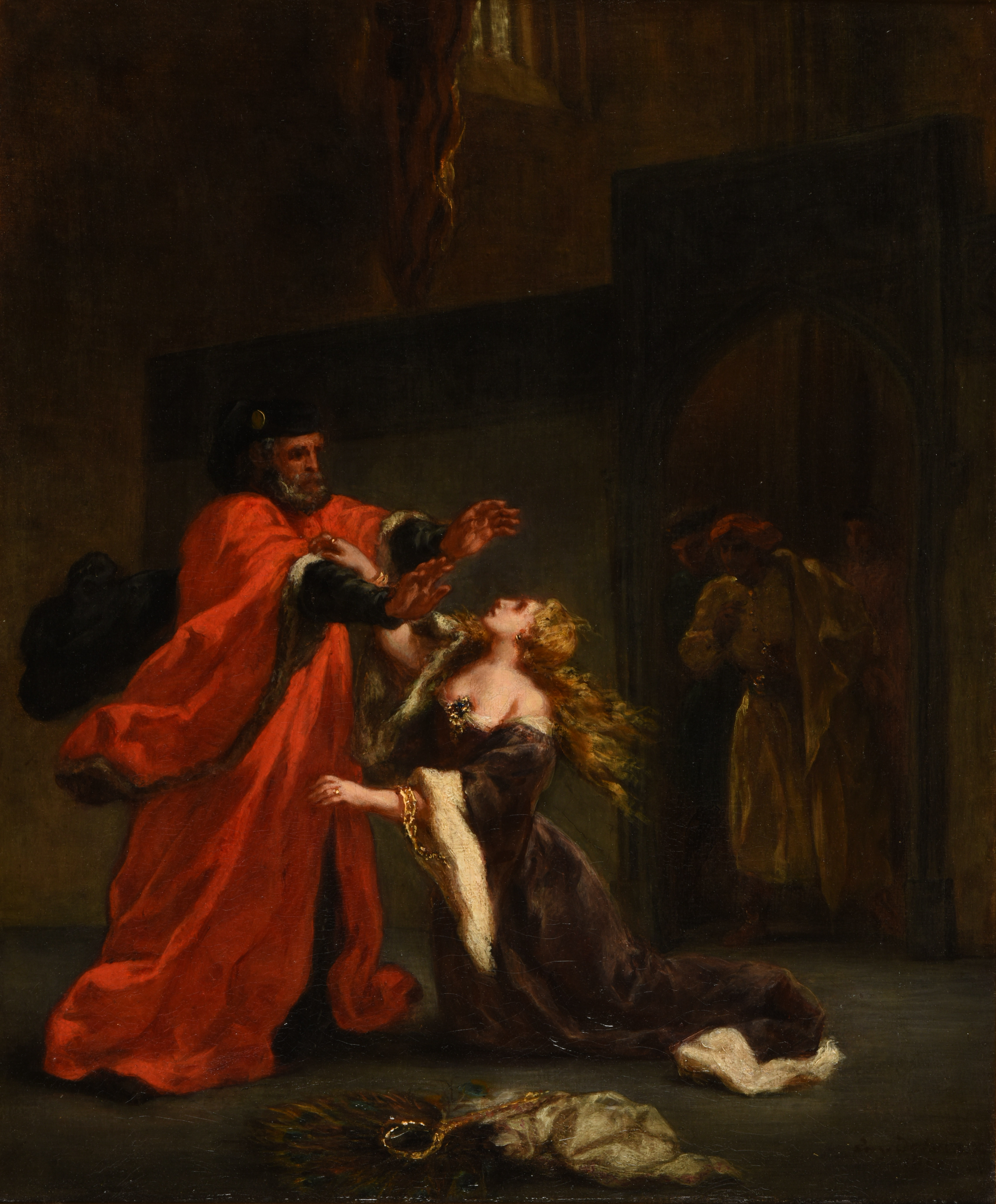
Eugène Delacroix, Desdémone maudite par son père, 1852, oil on canva, 61,6 x 51 cm, Reims, Museum of Fine Art

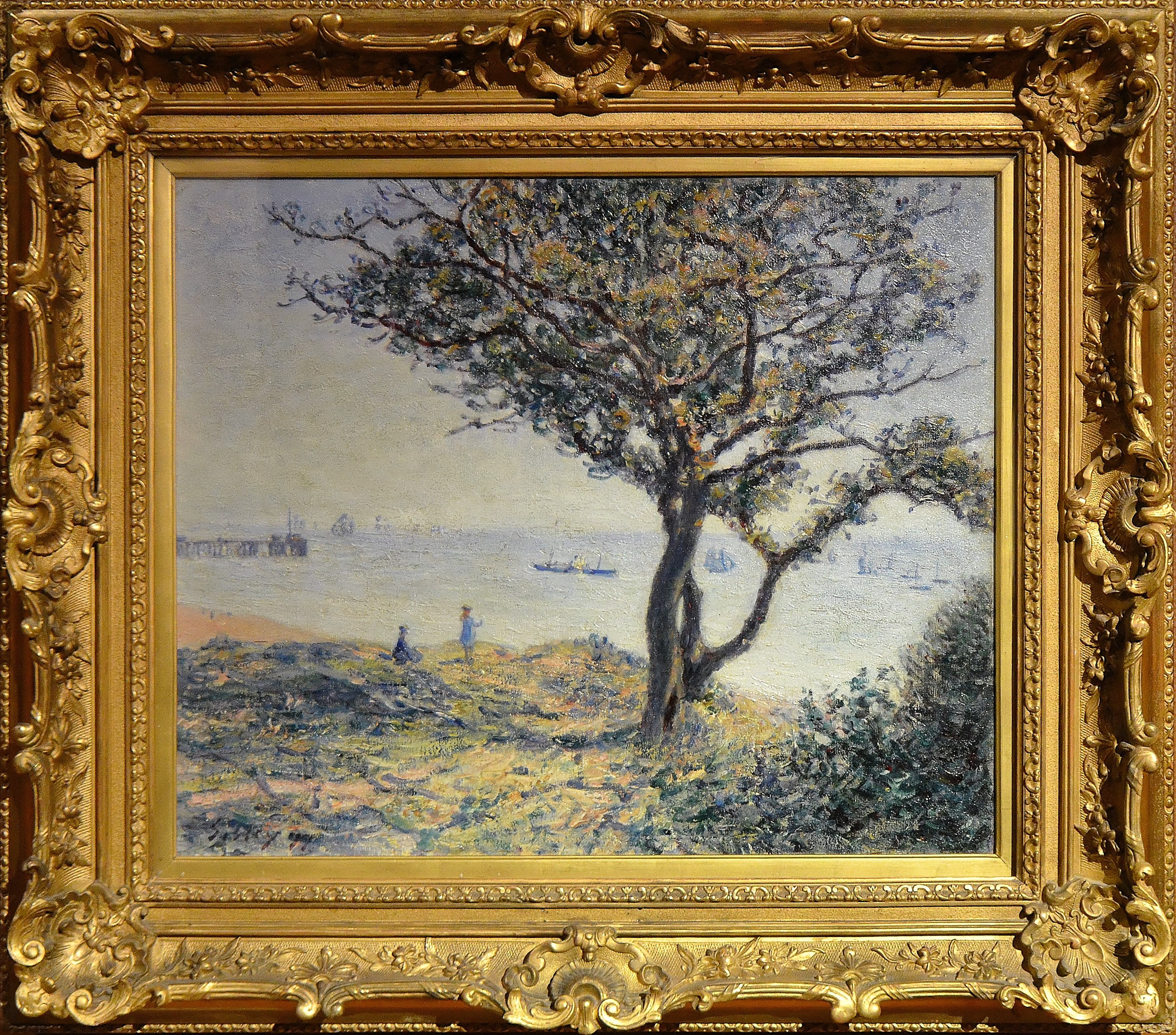
Alfred Sisley, La rade de Cardiff, 1897, oil on canva, 54,1 x 65,4 cm, Reims, Museum of Fine Art

From the outset, Henry Vasnier showed a marked liking for Camille Corot, whose painting Fishing in a Boat by the Willows appears in the background of his portrait by Joseph-Paul Meslé, and from whom he acquired five landscapes between 1883 and 1990. His pupil Henri-Joseph Harpignies also figured prominently in the collection, with thirteen paintings. Vasnier also showed an early interest in Romantic artists such as Théodore Géricault and Eugène Delacroix, whose "Desdémone maudite par son père". But it was landscapes that remained his favorite genre. Vasnier was a fervent collector of the Barbizon School, in particular the artists Georges Michel and Richard Parks Bonington, for whom he assembled one of the richest collections of his time. He also owned a number of Impressionist works: Alfred Sisley, Camille Pissarro, Claude Monet and Pierre-Auguste Renoir are represented in his collection. But most of his paintings are by artists who preceded Impressionism, such as Johan Barthold Jongkind, Charles Daubigny and Eugène Boudin. Some Impressionist followers, such as Maxime Maufra and Henry Moret, also found their way into his collection. Finally, Henry Vasnier's last years were characterized by a new taste for the Symbolist vein. He bought landscapes by Charles Cottet and René Ménard, seven paintings by Henri Martin, two by Henri Fantin-Latour and one by Pierre Puvis de Chavannes, "La Source". These latest purchases bring out another side of 19th-century painting, less realistic and more dreamlike.

In his later years, at the beginning of the 20th century, he acquired works by lesser-known artists such as Eugène Legout Gérard (1854–1924), Pierre Lagarde (1854–1910), Paul Meslé (1855–1929) and Alexandre Marcette (1853–1929), whereas his personal fortune would have allowed him to buy more highly-rated artists. He sought the expression of an ephemeral and mobile nature – that of the intangible where water and sky dominate – which was particularly sought after by the collector in the last years of his life. In 1902, in this vein, Henry Vasnier bought "La Rade de Cardiff" by Alfred Sisley (1839–1899). Of course, Vasnier's late choices were not as bold as those of the 1890s, when he bought two paintings of Monet: "Les Rochers de Belle-Île" (1886) and "Les Ravins de la Creuse" (1889), major paintings in the collection.

According to Atalone, Henry Vasnier's aim was to create a gallery of the 20th century. We can therefore consider that his late purchases were not simply the result of chance or fashion, but corresponded to a personal aesthetic commitment. Henry Vasnier was certainly an advocate of one of the branches of contemporary art of his time, which he resolutely wished to publicise in his gallery and, in the future, in a "conditional museum" that he wished to shape in his own way, according to his will. It is no doubt for this reason that Vasnier gives the impression of "having enriched his collection with the aim of staging a summary of nineteenth-century art history".

=== Henry Vasnier and the city of Reims ===
In addition to his legacy, Henry Vasnier was extremely involved in the life of the city. In 1891, President Sadi Carnot awarded him the Cross of the Legion of Honour, following which Vasnier granted 50,000 francs to the city for the construction of a cot. He also contributed 25,000 francs towards the construction of a statue of Joan of Arc.

Henry Vasnier was one of the members of the town's acquisition jury. Louis Guyotin, a former member of the Société des Amis des Arts de Reims and a regular visitor to Paris galleries, is said to have helped the Reims notables with their acquisitions and facilitated meetings with artists.

Involved in the social and cultural life of the city of Reims, as a member of the Société des Amis des Arts et des Musées and of an acquisitions committee, it seems clear that Henry Vasnier was not content to simply follow his advisor Louis Guyotin's lead when it came to acquisitions.

=== The bequest ===
From the 1880s onwards, Henry Vasnier dedicated his collection to enriching that of the city of Reims. In the months before his death, he undertook to support the project for a new museum. He discussed the lighting, ventilation and heating of the museum with the mayor, Dr Pozzi.

The instructions in the bequest were precise:

"The bequest made by me to the city of Reims is subject to the formal condition that my collections will be conserved by the city in such a way as to form a single exhibition in one and the same room, with lighting from above and not from the side through windows. This room will be hung with a red silky fabric, made of panne or plush like that used in the galleries where my paintings and objets d'art are kept, currently at 72, boulevard Lundy, in Reims.No art object or painting forming the whole of these collections may be removed or detached from them, and they will be kept together and grouped in the same room under the designation "Donation Henry Vasnier".This designation shall appear on the walls of the museum room containing them, at both ends, on two black marble slabs, in gilded hollow-cut letters". A few years later, the City of Reims and Henry Vasnier's heirs signed an amendment to the clauses of the will concerning the presentation of the collections. The new museum housing Henry Vasnier's collection was inaugurated on 19 October 1913 by President Raymond Poincaré.

In 1907, Henry Vasnier bequeathed most of his collection to the City of Reims, as he had wished for several years. His works are still housed in the Musée des Beaux-Arts de Reims. Some are on public display in the permanent exhibition areas, such as "L'Avenue de l'Opéra" by Camille Pissarro, "Les Rochers de Belle-Ile" by Claude Monet, and "La Rade de Cardiff" by Alfred Sisley.

== Exhibitions on Henry Vasnier and his collection ==
- "Millet, Rousseau, Daumier… : chefs-d’œuvre de la donation d’arts graphiques d’Henry Vasnier", exhibition, City of Reims, Musée des Beaux-Arts, 2002.
- "L’oeil d’un collectionneur : Catalogue raisonné de la collection d’Henry Vasnier", exhibition, Karuizawa, Musée d’Art Mercian, 11 July – 9 November 2003.
- "Henry Vasnier : Les passions modernes d’un collectionneur audacieux", exhibition, City of Reims, Villa Demoiselle, 6 November 2015 – 4 September 2016.

== Tributes ==
A boulevard in Reims and a street in Prunay (Marne) bear his name.

He is buried in the East Rheims cemetery.
