= Paul Grandhomme =

French sculptor and enameller (1851–1944)

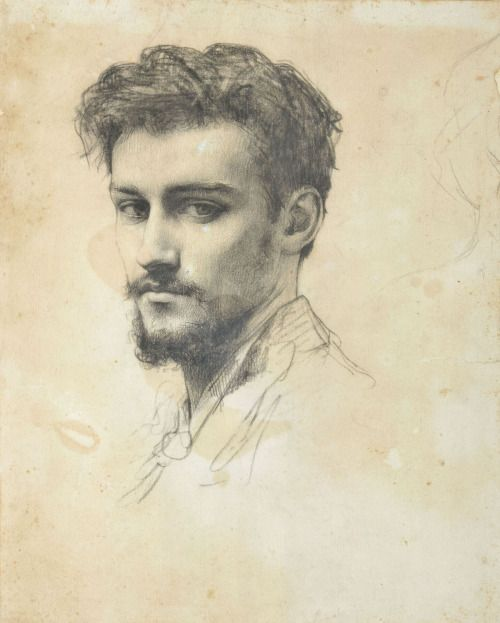
Paul Grandhomme by Raphaël Collin.

Paul Grandhomme (1851, Paris, France – 1944, Saint-Briac-sur-Mer, France) was a French medalist, engraver and enameller.

== Life ==
He was originally trained as a jeweller, but the 1871 Franco-Prussian war forced him to become a librarian. This proved to be the start of his enamelling career as, after reading Claudius Popelin’s history of enamelling, Grandhomme became fascinated by the technique. After studying with Auguste Mollard, an enameller who was experienced in the chemistry of enamelling, and Jules-Clément Chaplain, he worked with Pierre Puvis de Chavannes and Jules-Élie Delaunay, and was influenced by his friend and fellow artist, Raphaël Collin. In 1874 he presented work at the Salon of French Artists (Salon des artistes français), an enamel portrait of Vittoria Colonna.

In 1877 he began to collaborate with his pupil Alfred Jean Garnier, and together they presented further work at the Salon des artistes français, including a Virgin in the style of Carlo Crivelli, and a portrait of Edward VII. Together they won the gold medal at the 1889 Universal Exhibition in Paris. They were also the last enamellers to collaborate with Gustave Moreau.

Another frequent collaborator of Grandhomme's was Jules Brateau, a silversmith and metal-worker. Grandhomme used his flat as his studio, with his dining room as the main area of work, and using a furnace in his kitchen to bake the enamel. Grandhomme also worked with the Falize Jewellery house, particularly Lucien Falize.

He is buried in Saint-Briac-sur-Mer. His tomb is topped by a bronze statue created by Émile Armel-Beaufils and his wife.

== Works ==
Grandhomme worked mainly in the Limoges School Revival style.

A variety of Grandhomme's work is displayed at the Musée d'Orsay, including a series of enamelled tableaux on Greek mythological themes that he created with Garnier in the style of Gustave Moreau. Two of his enamelled medals are on show at the Metropolitan Museum of Art. A pre-World War I commemorative medal he made was part of a Victoria and Albert Museum exhibition on 'European Commemorative Medals for the Great War'.
