= Maurice Yans =

Belgian historian and archivist

Maurice Jean Alfred Alphonse Yans (1914–1983) was a Belgian historian and archivist who served as a conservator at the State Archive of Liège.

== Life ==
Yans was born in Glain on 15 May 1914, the son of a baker. Educated at the Athénée royal de Liège he became a history student at the University of Liège in 1931 at the age of 17. In 1936 he obtained a doctorate, passed the exam for candidate archivists in the Belgian State Archives, and won a travel bursary which he used to study in Paris, following courses at the École Nationale des Chartes, the Sorbonne, the Collège de France, École normale supérieure and the École pratique des hautes études. In 1938 he began to work in the State Archives in Liège, which were hit by a V-2 rocket on 24 December 1944 and caught fire. Yans was among the salvage workers who dug through the ruins in freezing weather to see what could be saved.

He was elected a local councillor for Glain in 1946, and also became a member of the Commission communale d’histoire de l'ancien pays de Liège. Together with Léon Halkin, he founded and directed an École pratique d'histoire et d'archéologie régionales in Liège. In the State Archives, Yans became assistant conservator in 1951, conservator in 1958, and chief of department in 1969. He retired on 31 May 1979. He died in Liège on 18 March 1983.

Yans was active in the Institut archéologique liégeois, serving as president 1957–1958. He was also an active member of the Société des bibliophiles liégeois, Musée de la vie wallonne, Société d'art et d'histoire du diocèse de Liège, and the Commission royale de toponymie et de dialectologie.

== Publications ==
- Histoire économique du duché de Limbourg sous la maison de Bourgogne: Les forêts et les mines (Brussels, 1938)
- L'équité et le droit liégeois du Moyen Age: Étude historique des successions (Liège, 1946)
- Les Echevins de Huy: Biographies des échevins et des maires de Huy-Grande (Liège, 1952)
- with Georges de Froidcourt (eds), Lettres autographes de Velbruck, prince-évêque de Liège (1772-1784) (2 vols, Liège, 1954–1955)
- Contribution à l'histoire patrimoniale de la Maison de Brialmont (Liège, 1973)
- La banlieue liégeoise: Aux origines de la grande agglomération (Liège, 1974)
