= Museum of Fine Arts, Reims =

Musée des beaux-arts de Reims
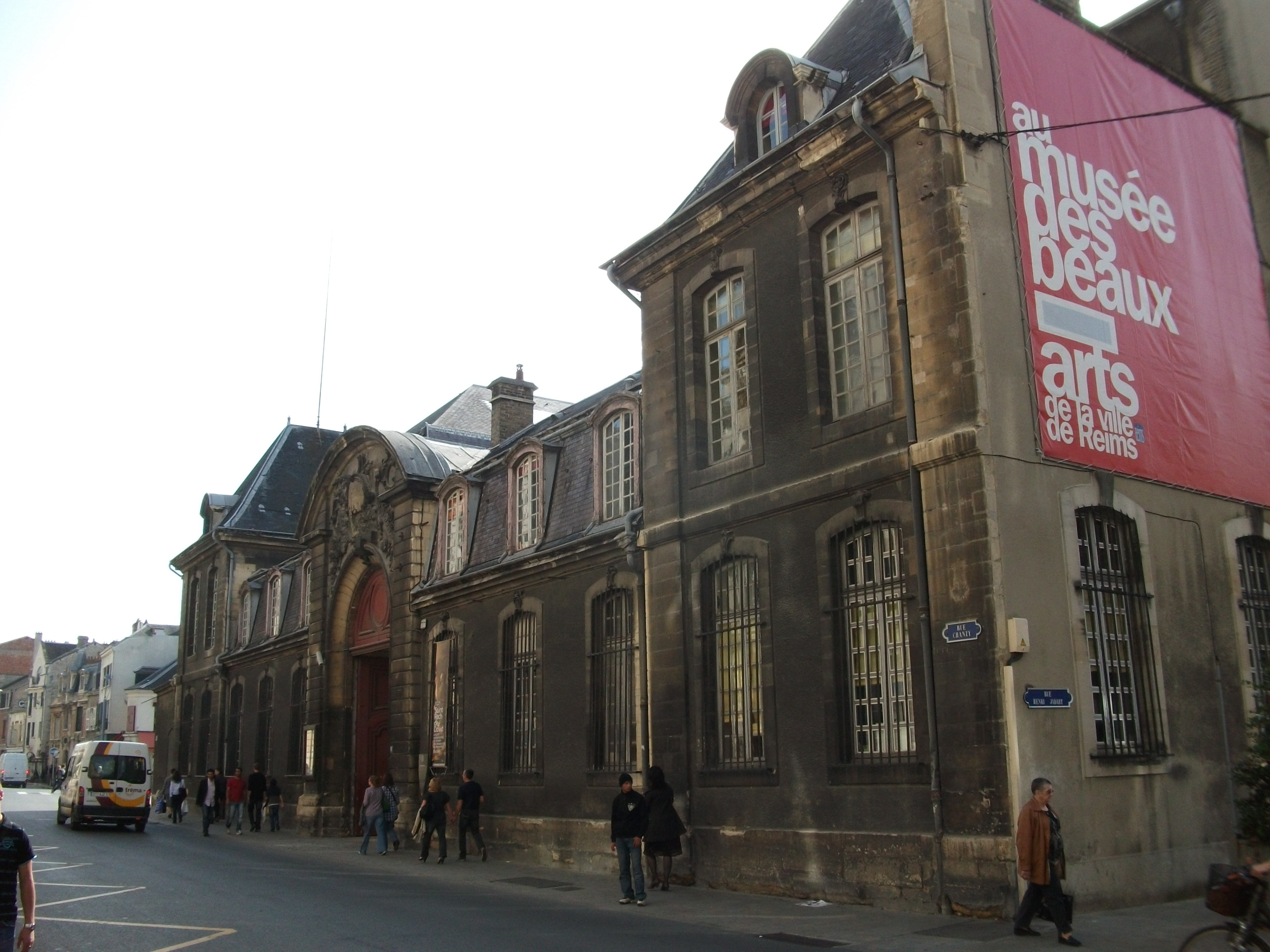
- Established: 1794
- Location: 8, rue Chanzy 51100 Reims, France
- Coordinates: 49°15′12″N 4°01′51″E
- Type: Art museum
- Website: Musée des Beaux-Arts de Reims — (in French)

The Museum of Fine Arts (French: Musée des beaux-arts) is a fine arts museum in Reims, France.

== History ==
Antoine Ferrand de Monthelon, founder of the school of drawings, bequeaths in 1752, his collection to the city of Reims. Organizer and first curator of the Museum of Reims (1793–1806), Nicolas Bergeat safeguarded works of art seized from the Catholic institutions in Reims and first official deposit was recorded on 10 Vendémiaire, Year II in the former hospice of Magneuses. The Museum of Fine Arts was founded in 1794, with objects seized during the French Revolution and was first housed in the city's town hall. Throughout the 19th century, its collections grew via purchases and bequests, until in 1908, the city of Reims decided to buy a separate building to house it. Their choice fell on the former Saint-Denis Abbey of Reims located in vicinity of Reims Cathedral. Abbey construction was started in the 9th century by Archbishop of Reims Fulk on the site of a former cemetery. It had then undergone several uses since the Revolution, as the French Directory's district headquarters, a store for artworks from sold-off churches, in 1814 and 1815 a barracks for Russian occupation troops, and finally in 1822 as a grand seminary. It was abandoned as a seminary in 1906, after the 1905 French law on the Separation of the Churches and the State and the museum moved into it. It was then renovated, with the museum's rooms partly corresponding to the 18th century, abbot's palace, rebuilt in the 19th century. The museum was re-opened in its new home on 19 October 1913 by president Raymond Poincaré.

== Collections ==
The collections cover all the main European artistic movements from the 16th to 20th centuries, and are shown in chronological and thematic order. Though it also houses sculptures, drawings (including 13 exceptional watercolour portraits on paper by Lucas Cranach the Elder, on rotating show in a special room devoted to them), engravings, furniture and objets d’art, most of the museum's objects are paintings, notably from the Flemish, Dutch and French schools and by historic and modern artists, with the French school being the most prominently represented, notably the 17th century. Artists represented include :

- Flanders, Holland and Germany – Marinus van Reymerswaele, Roelandt Savery, Jacob Jordaens, Bartholomeus van der Helst, Jacob van Loo, Gerard Seghers, David Teniers the Younger, Nicolaes Maes, Melchior d'Hondecoeter and Matthias Withoos
- Italy – Giovanni Battista Moroni and Bartolomeo Manfredi.
- France –
  - 17th century – Nicolas Poussin, Simon Vouet, the Frères Le Nain (born in the Reims region), Jacques Blanchard, Philippe de Champaigne, Pierre Mignard, Laurent de La Hyre, Sébastien Bourdon, Gaspard Dughet, Charles Le Brun, Jean Jouvenet
  - 18th century – François Desportes, François Boucher, Anne Vallayer-Coster, Jacques-Louis David
  - 19th century – 27 canvases (second only to the Louvre for this artist) by Camille Corot donated by Henri Vasnier and others, Eugène Delacroix, Richard Parkes Bonington, Théodore Chassériau, Jean-François Millet, Théodore Rousseau, Johan Barthold Jongkind, Gustave Courbet, Honoré Daumier, Eugène Boudin, Claude Monet, Camille Pissarro, Alfred Sisley, Pierre-Auguste Renoir, Pierre Puvis de Chavannes, Henri Fantin-Latour, Eugène Carrière, Paul Gauguin, Émile Bernard, Victor Vignon, Édouard Vuillard
  - 20th century – Pierre Bonnard, Henri Matisse, Raoul Dufy, Albert Marquet, Jean Puy, Louis Marcoussis, Vieira da Silva

== Gallery ==
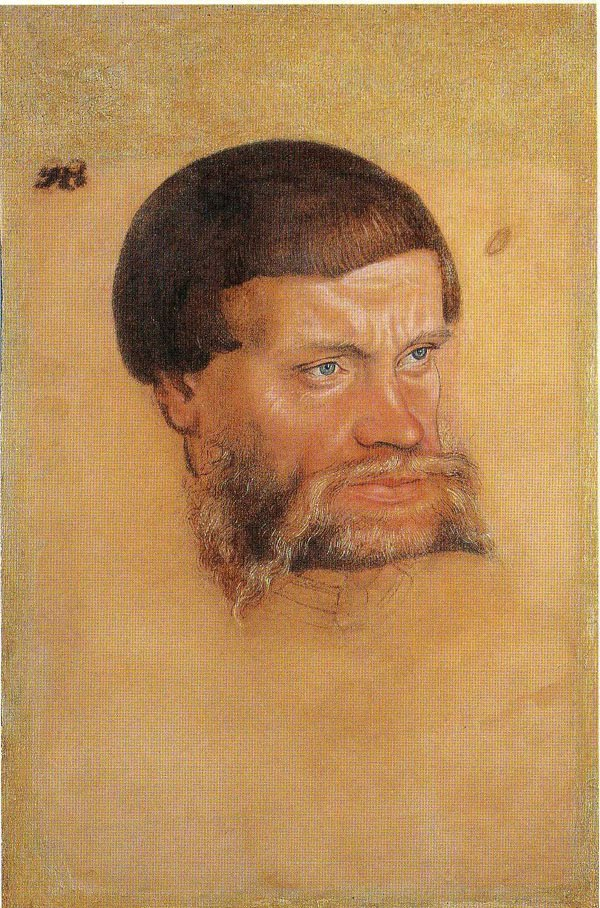
Conrad Krebs, architect by Lucas Cranach the Elder, 1540

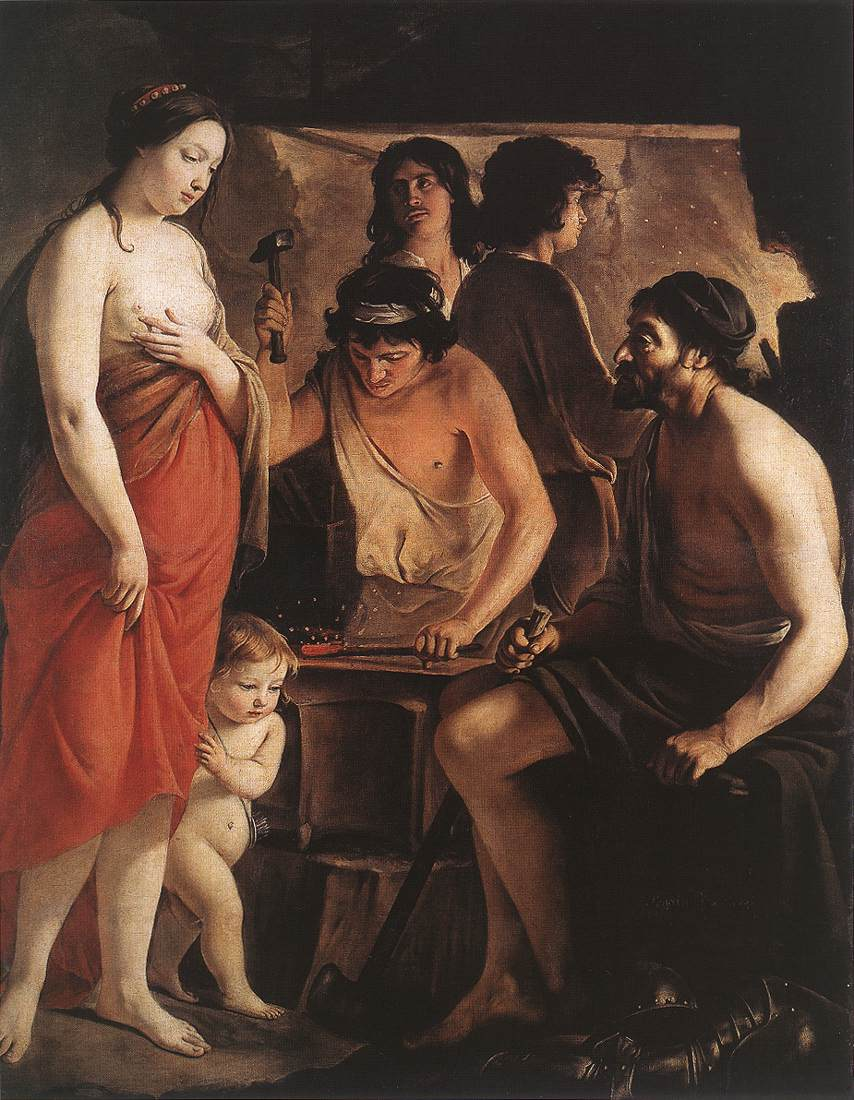
Venus at the Forge of Vulcan by the Frères Le Nain, 1641.

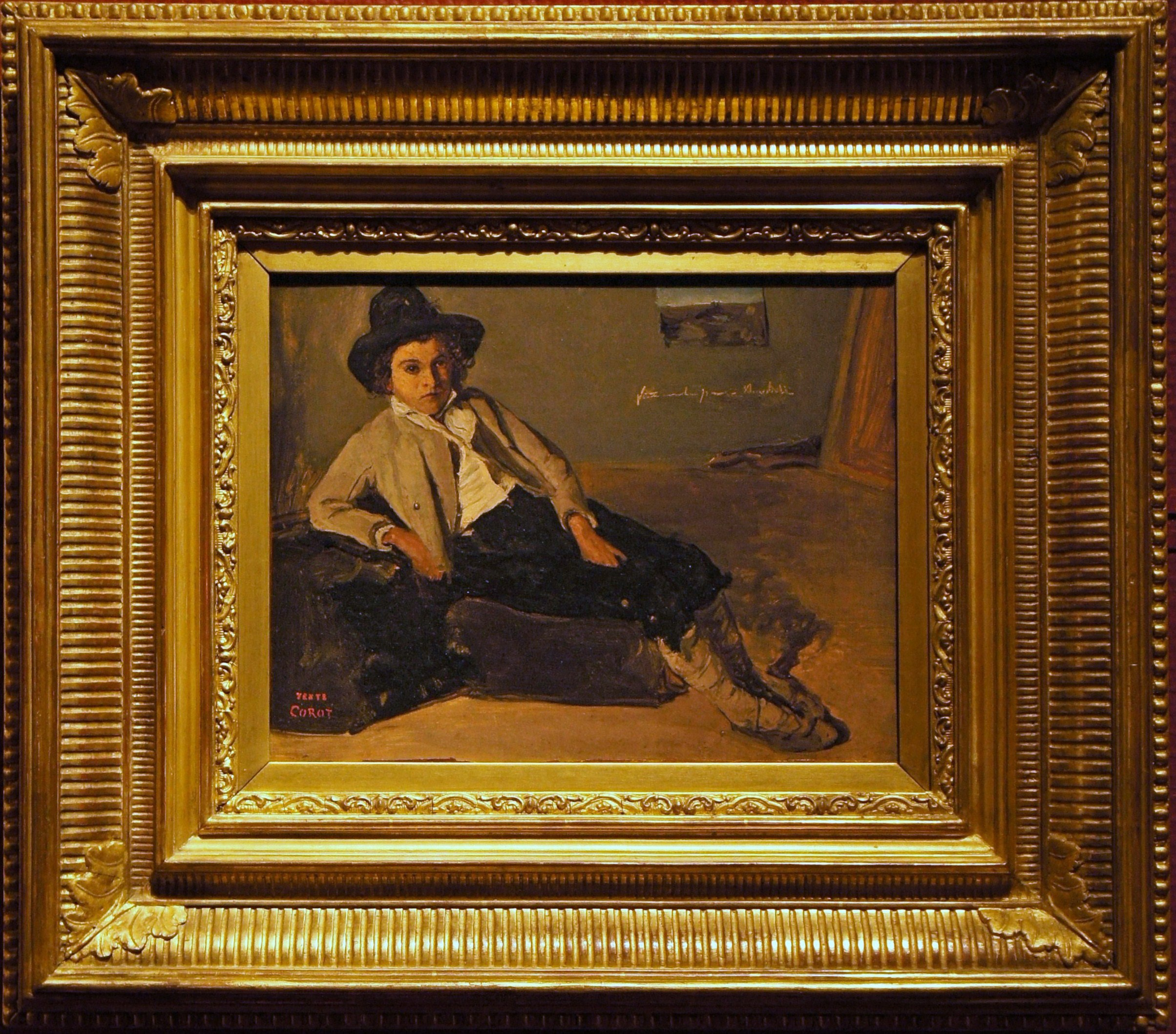
Jeune italien assis by Jean-Baptiste-Camille Corot, circa 1825

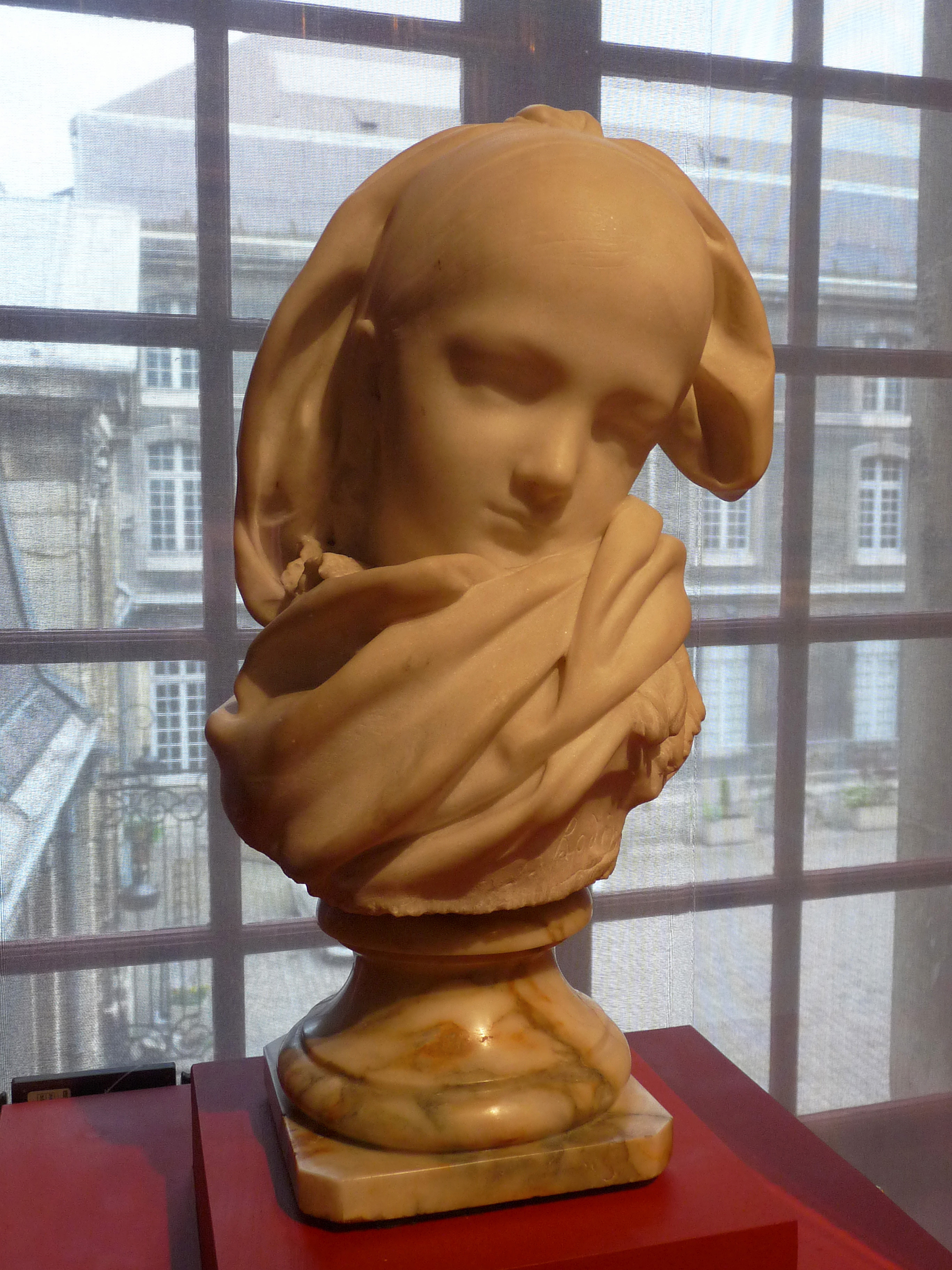
Jeune Alsacienne of Orpheline alsacienne by Rodin

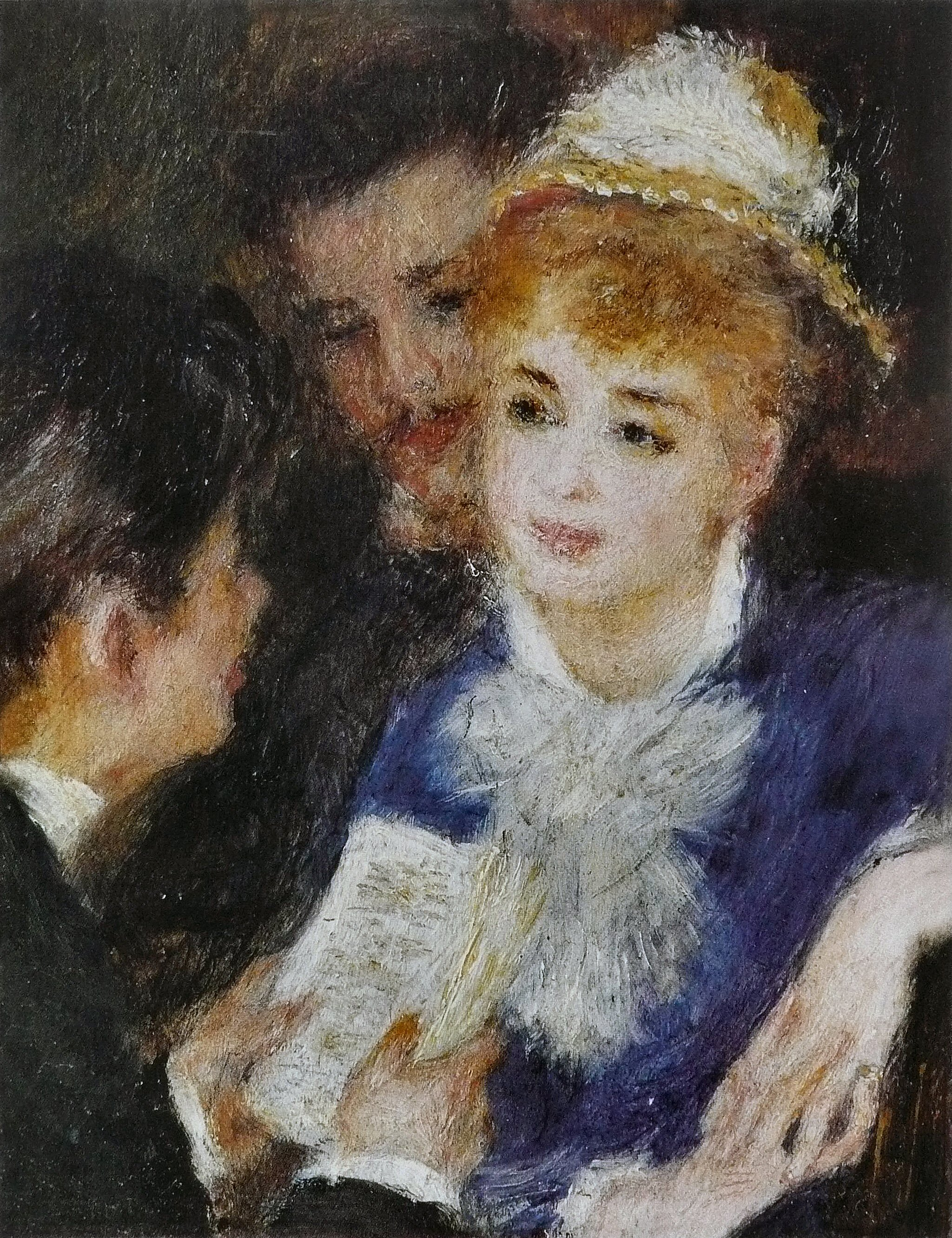
La lecture du rôle by Renoir, 1876-1877

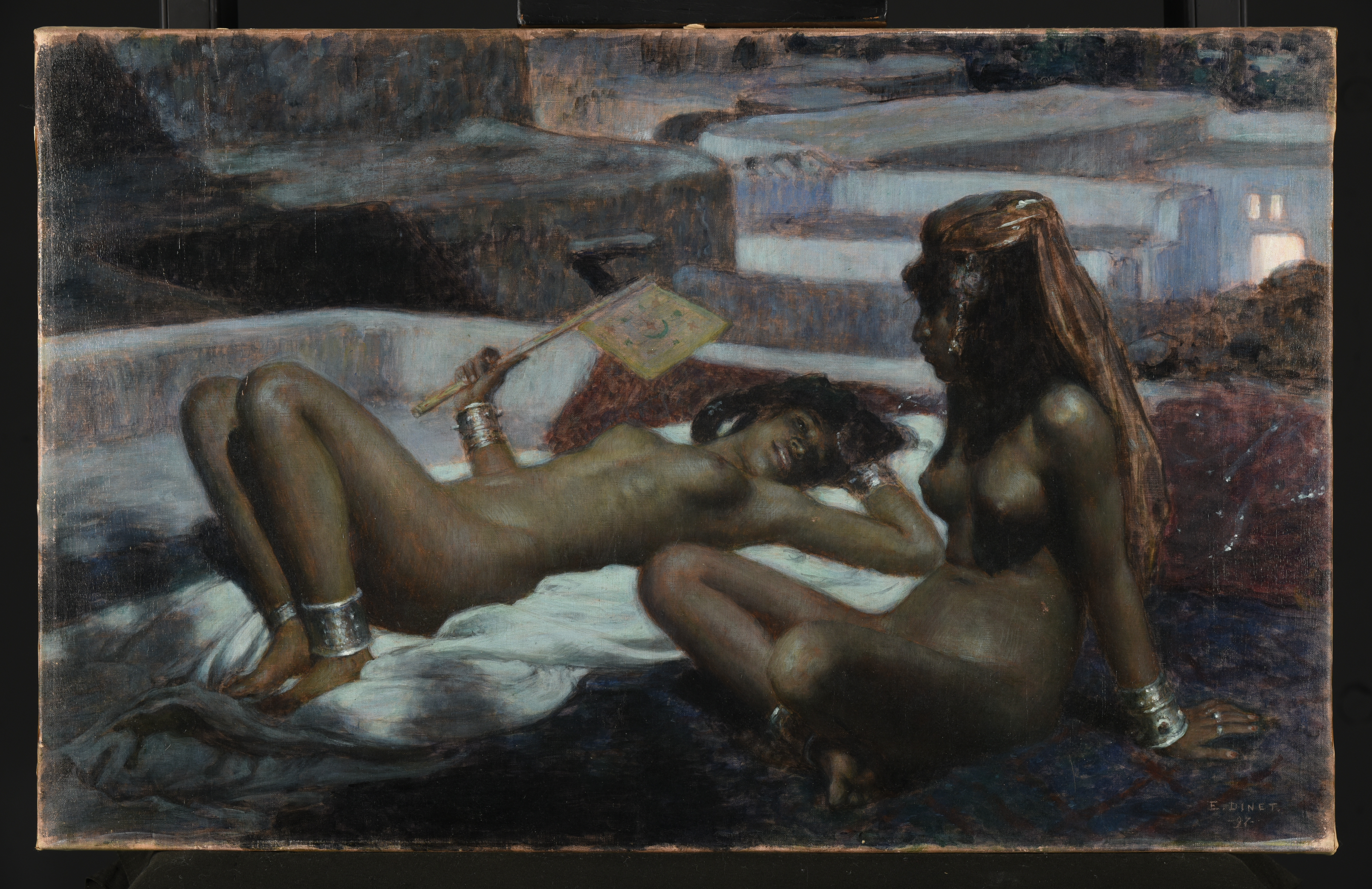
On the Terraces. Laghouat by Moonlight by Nasreddine Dinet, 1897

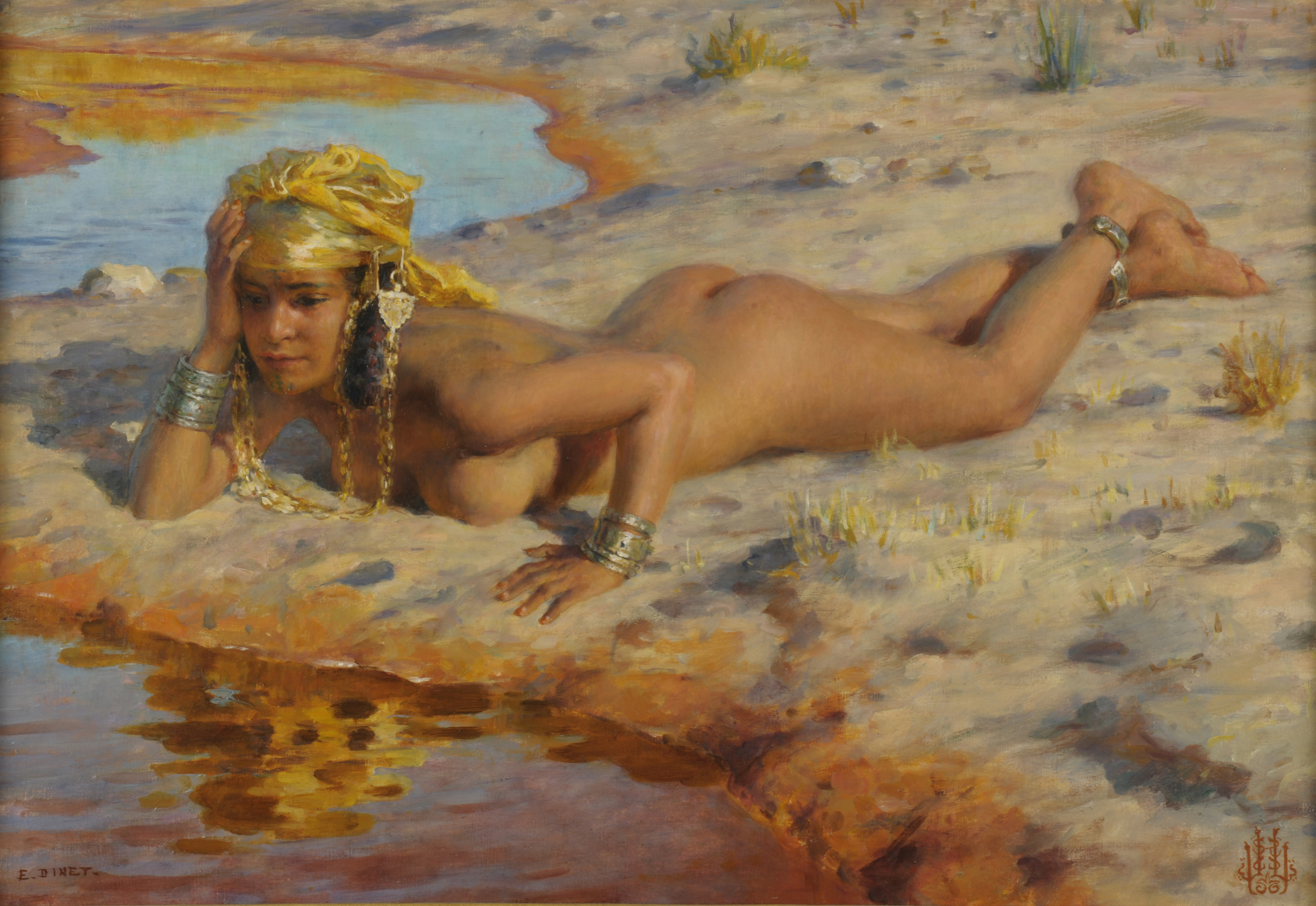
On the Banks of the Wadi by Nasreddine Dinet, 1898

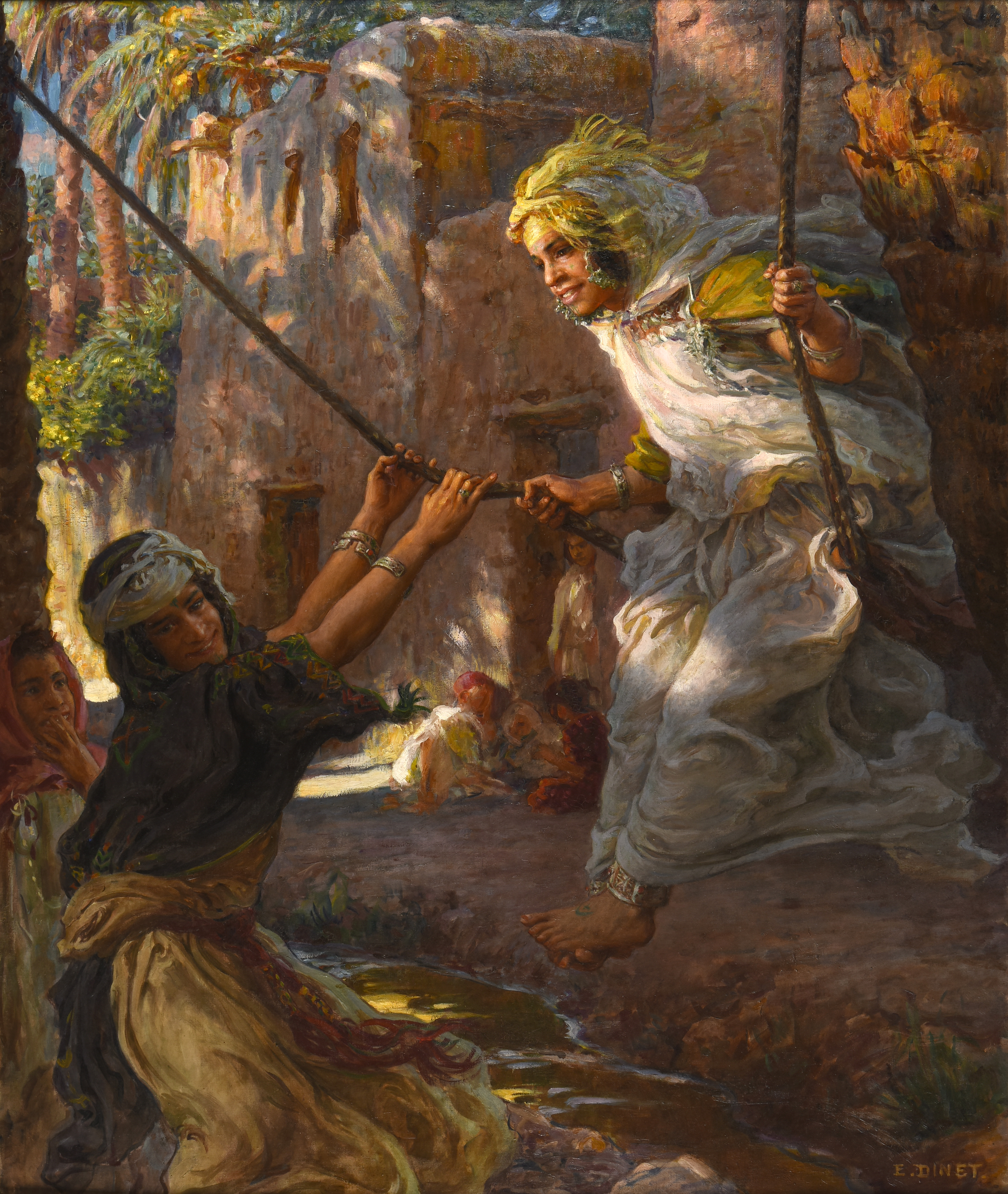
The Swing by Nasreddine Dinet, 1899

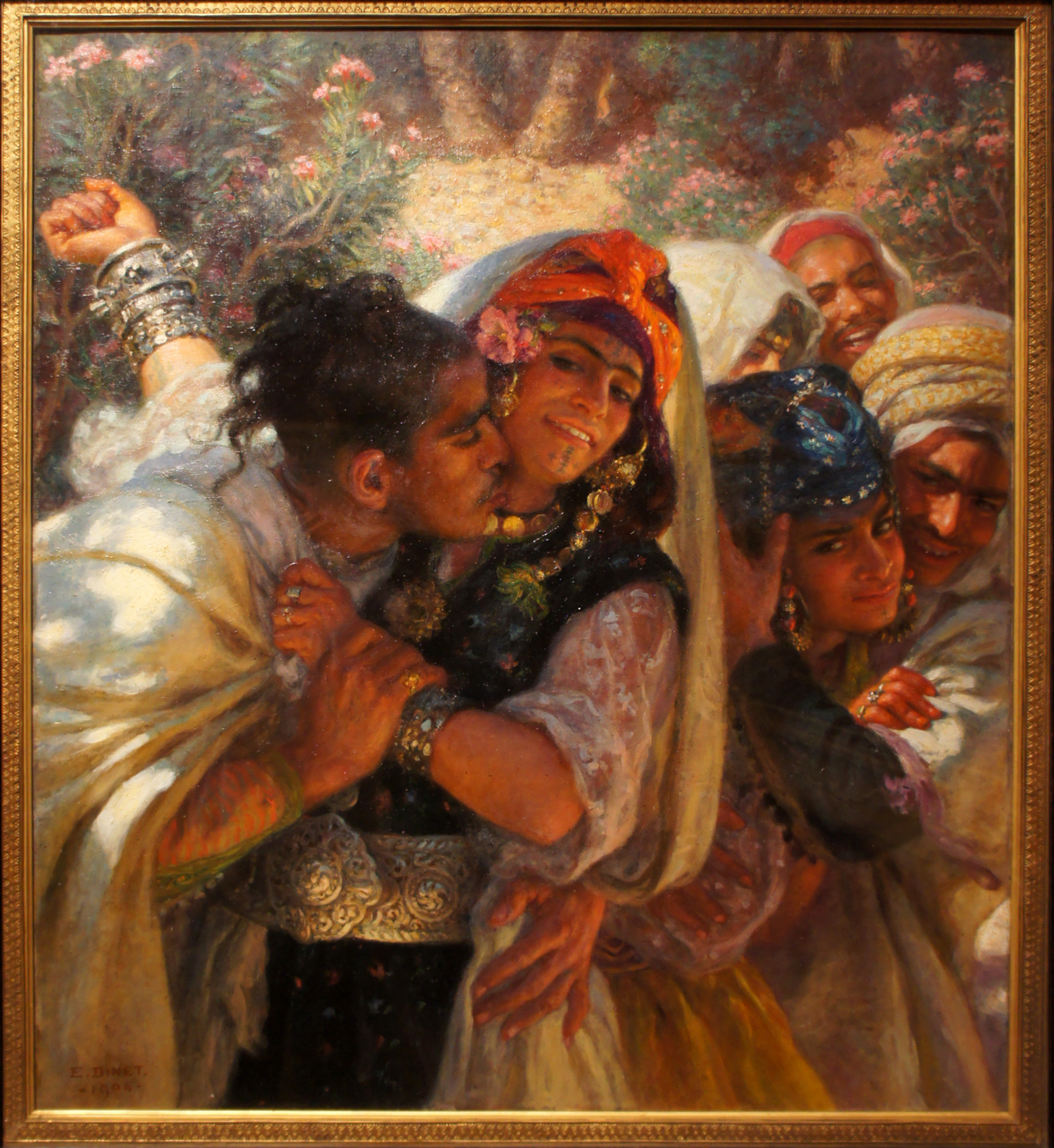
Spring of hearts by Nasreddine Dinet, 1904

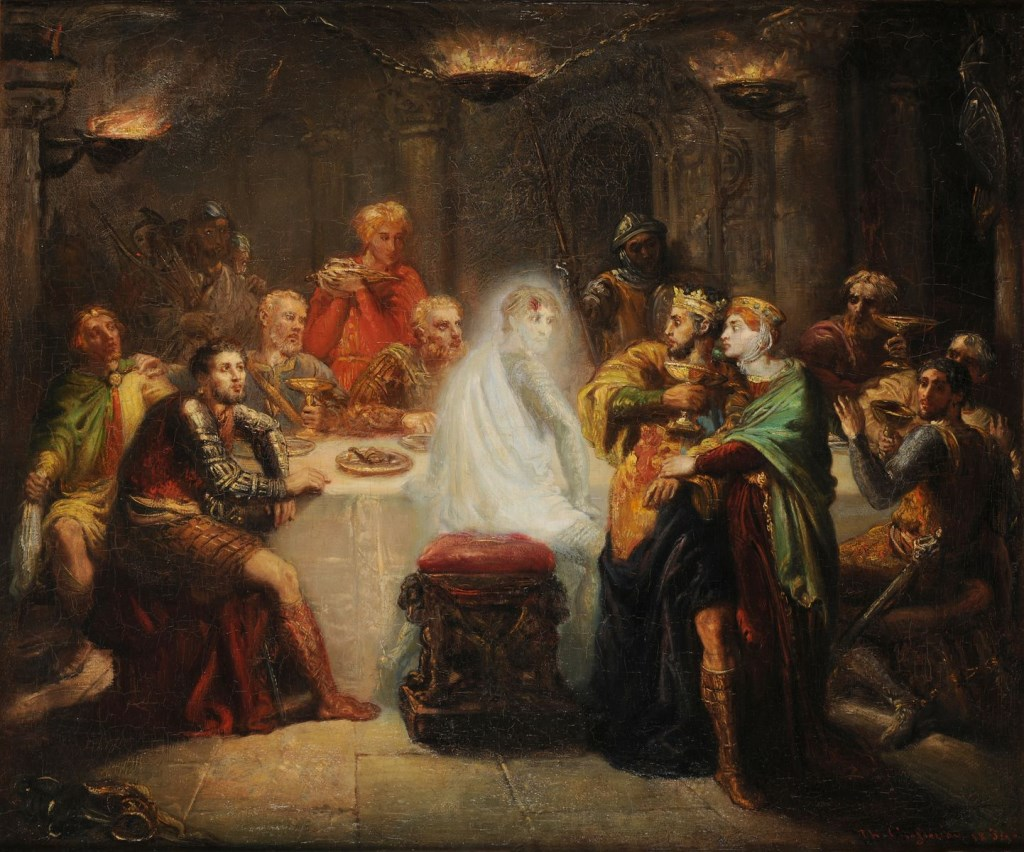
Banquo's Ghost by Théodore Chassériau

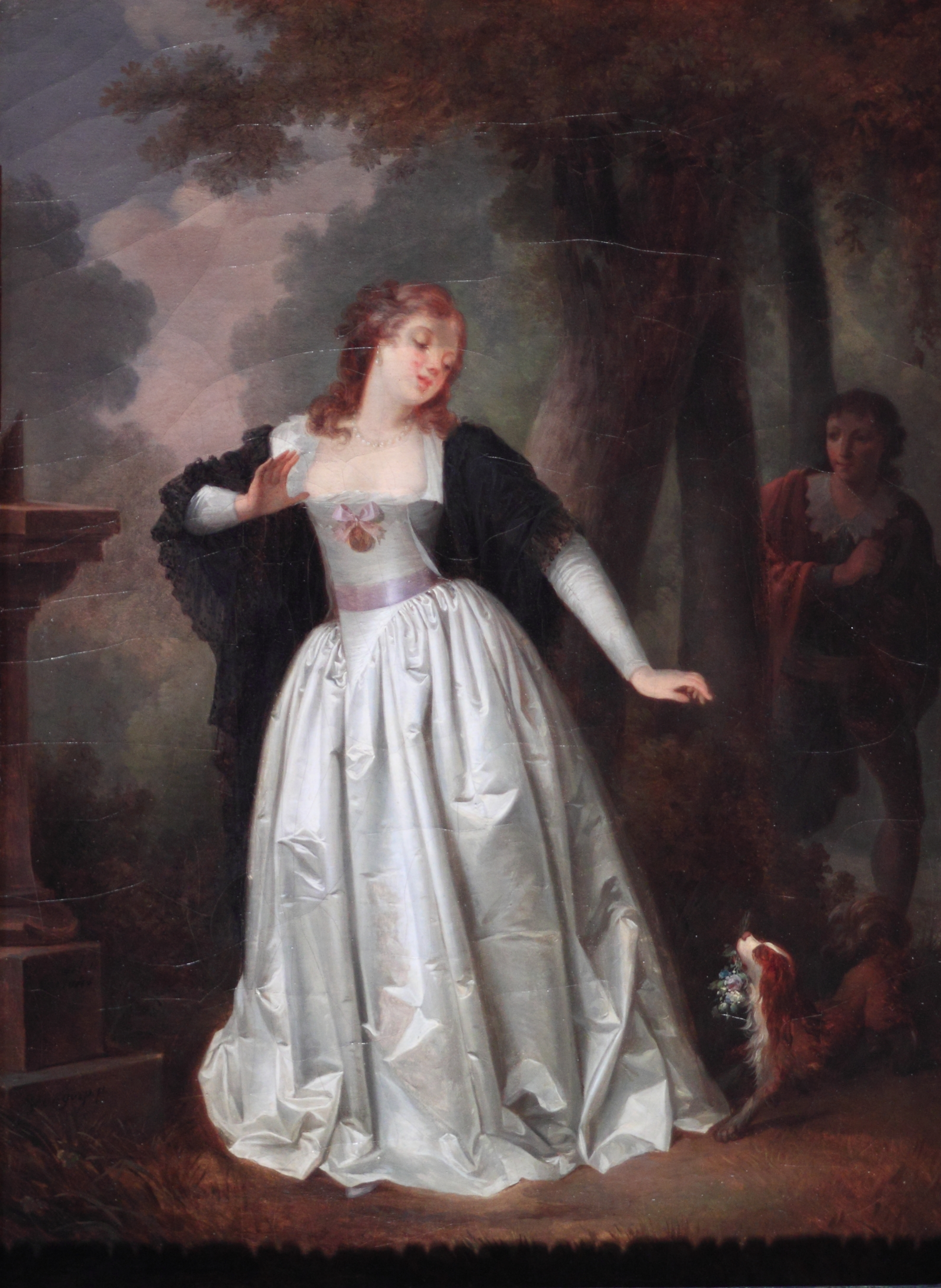
Ah ! Le Voilà ! by Henri-Nicolas Van Gorp

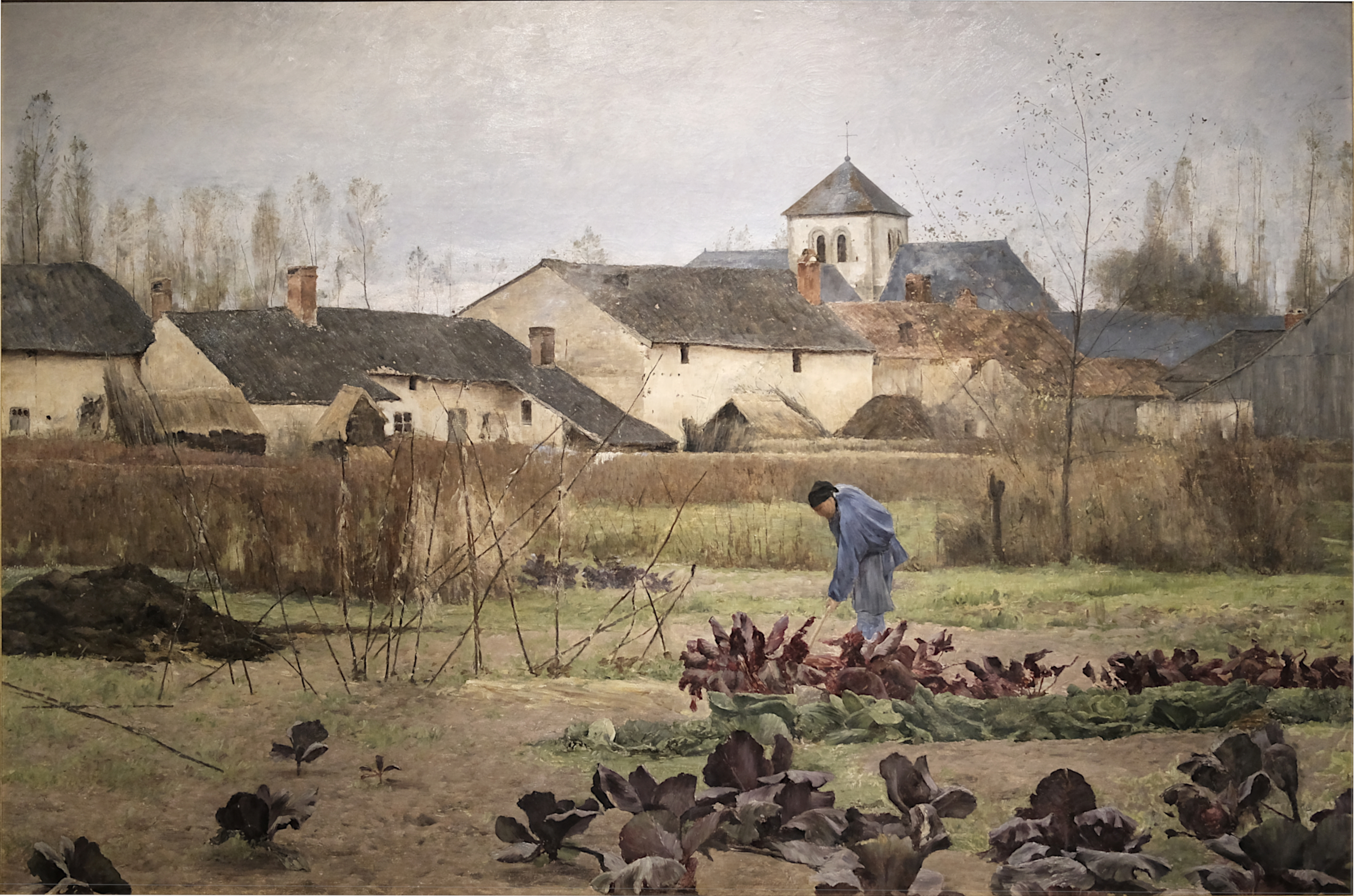
Jardinage d'automne by Émile Barau, 1885.

== Reconstruction project ==
In 2014, a decision was made to restore, reorganize and expand the museum. Work should begin in September 2019 and end in 2023. The new museum complex will cover an area of 5,500 m ^{2}, which will house about 20,000 works of art. A budget of 45.3 million euros has been allocated for this large-scale project.
