= Alfred Jean-Marie Paris =

French painter (1848–1908)

- Born: 1848; Tarbes, France
- Died: 1908 (aged 59–60)
- Education: Sociedad Estímulo de Bellas Artes, Buenos Aires; Édouard Detaille (France)
- Movement: Genre painting, Orientalism

Alfred Jean-Marie Paris (1848–1908) was a French painter, illustrator, and lithographer. As a genre painter, he worked figuratively and specialized in battles and horses.

== Life and work ==
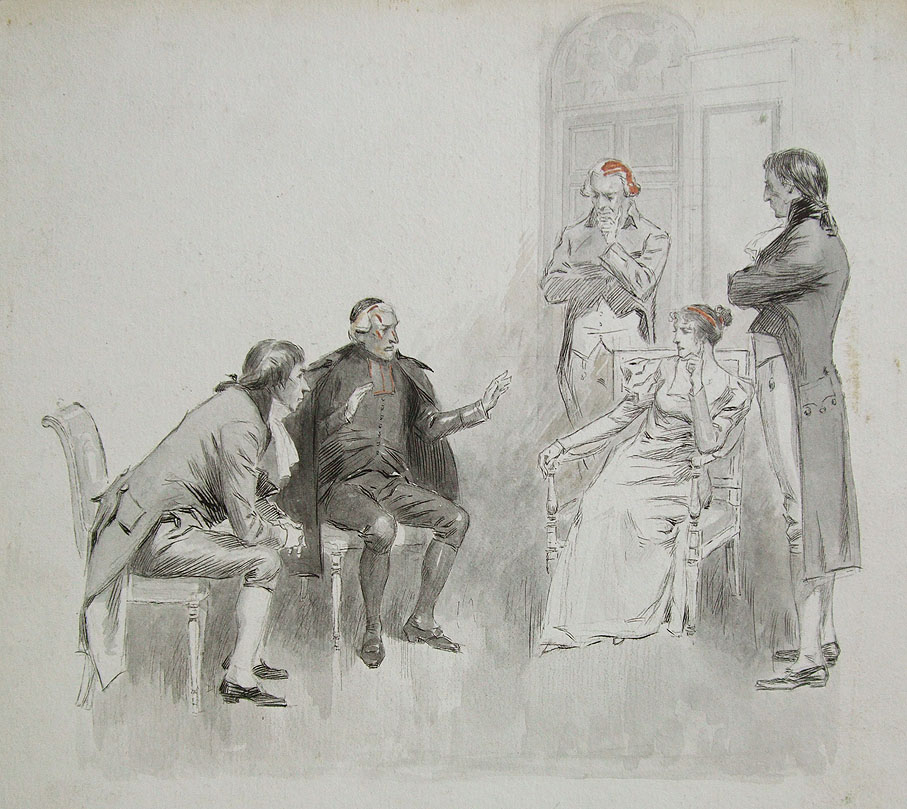
Conversation sous l'Empire

Paris was born in Tarbes. He developed his artistic skills in Buenos Aires, where he trained at the Sociedad Estímulo de Bellas Artes and collaborated closely with Eduardo Sívori, especially in stone drawing and illustration. After returning to France, he studied under Édouard Detaille, exhibited regularly at the Salon des artistes français, and became known for his drawings, genre scenes, and orientalist-inspired paintings. From the late 1880s onward, he produced numerous critically acclaimed illustrations for youth and adventure literature with major publishers, significantly shaping the visual culture of popular printed works of his time.

=== Publications ===
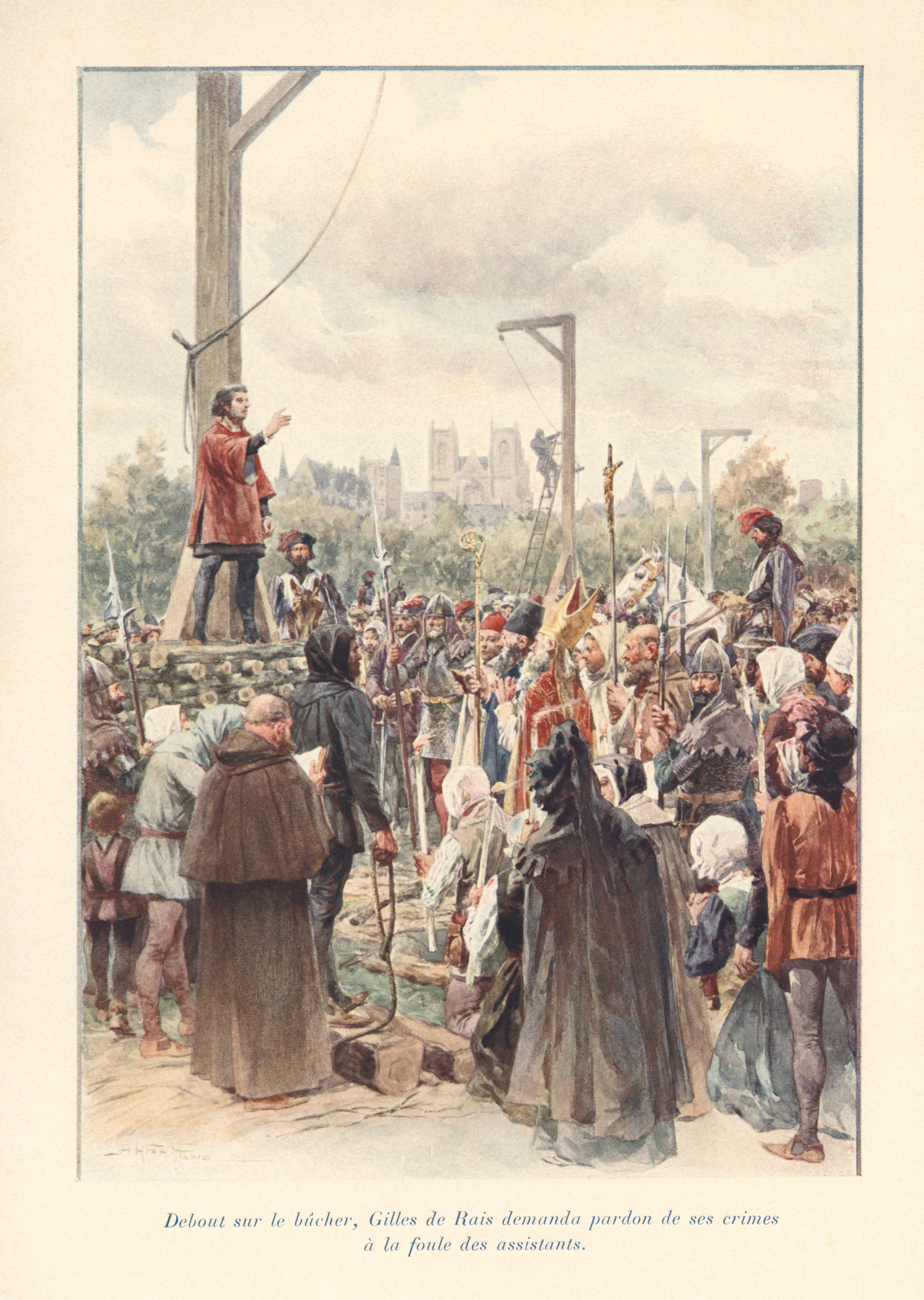
“Gilles de Rais Asking Forgiveness for His Crimes” (reproduction of a watercolor in Les Brigands, 1903)

- Louis Garneray, Voyages, aventures et combats, édition revue pour la jeunesse par Victor Tissot, coll. « Aventures, voyages, chasses et combats », Paris, Morot frères et Chuit, 1887.
- Alfred Ébelot, La Pampa. Mœurs sud-américaines, Paris, Maison Quantin / Buenos Aires, Joseph Escary, 1890.
- Ludovic Halévy, L'Invasion 1870-1871 : récits de guerre, ill. avec Ludovico Marchetti, Paris, Boussod, Valadon & Cie, 1891.
- Claire Julie de Nanteuil, Une poursuite, Paris, Hachette, 1892.
- Pierre Maël, Une Française au pôle Nord, Paris, Hachette, 1893.
- Claire Julie de Nanteuil, L'Héritier des Vaubert, Paris, Hachette, 1895.
- Maurice Loir, Gloires et souvenirs maritimes, Paris, Administration de l'Univers illustré, 1895. (sixième édition 1922)
- Henry Guy, Le Roman d'un petit marin, coll. « Bibliothèque des écoles et des familles », Paris, Hachette, 1895.
- Émile de Saint-Auban, La Voix des choses, Paris, A. Pedone, 1896.
- Gérard de Beauregard et Henry de Gorsse, Les plumes du paon, ill. de 78 gravures, Paris, Hachette, 1899.
- Gustave Toudouze, Les mystères de la chauve-souris, ill. de 62 gravures, Paris, Hachette, 1900.
- Danielle d'Arthez, L'Or du pôle, Paris, Hachette, 1900.
- Pierre Maël, Petit Ange, Tours, A. Mame & fils, 1900.
- Charles Malo (1851–1912), Champs de bataille de l'armée française : Belgique, Allemagne, Italie,..., ill. de 12 aquarelles, Paris, Hachette, 1901.
- Alexandre Pouchkine, La Fille du capitaine, trad. du russe par Louis Viardot, Paris, Hachette, 1901.
- Georges Saint-Yves, Les Libres Burghers, Tours, A. Mame & fils, 1901.
- [collectif], Les évasions célèbres, Paris, Hachette, 1902.
- Jean Bertheroy, Le Rachat, Tours, A. Mame & fils, 1902.
- Pierre Maël, Robinson et Robinsonne, Paris, Hachette, 1902.
- Gérard de Beauregard, Le Rubis de Lapérouse, ill. de 68 gravures, Paris, Hachette, 1902.
- Henri de Noussanne, Les grands naufrages, drame de la mer : 45 récits inédits..., Paris, Hachette, 1903.
- Frantz Funck-Brentano, Les Brigands, Paris, Hachette, 1903.
- René Bazin, La Terre qui meurt, Tours, A. Mame & fils, 1904.
- Georges Pradel, L'Œil-de-tigre, Tours, A. Mame & fils, 1905.
- Eugène Mouton, Aventures et mésaventures de Joel Kerbabu, Breton de Landerneau en Bretagne , Paris, Hachette, 1907.
- Gabriel Ferry, Les aventuriers du Val d'or, ill. d'après Gustave Doré, Paris, Hachette, 1907.
- Pierre Maël, Un mousse de Surcouf, ill. de 50 gravures, Paris, Hachette, 1907.
- Pierre Maël, La Fée des îles, Paris, Hachette, 1908.
- Pierre Maël, Au pays du mystère, ill. de 50 dessins, Paris, Hachette, 1909.
