= Alfred Jean Garnier =

French painter (1848–1908)

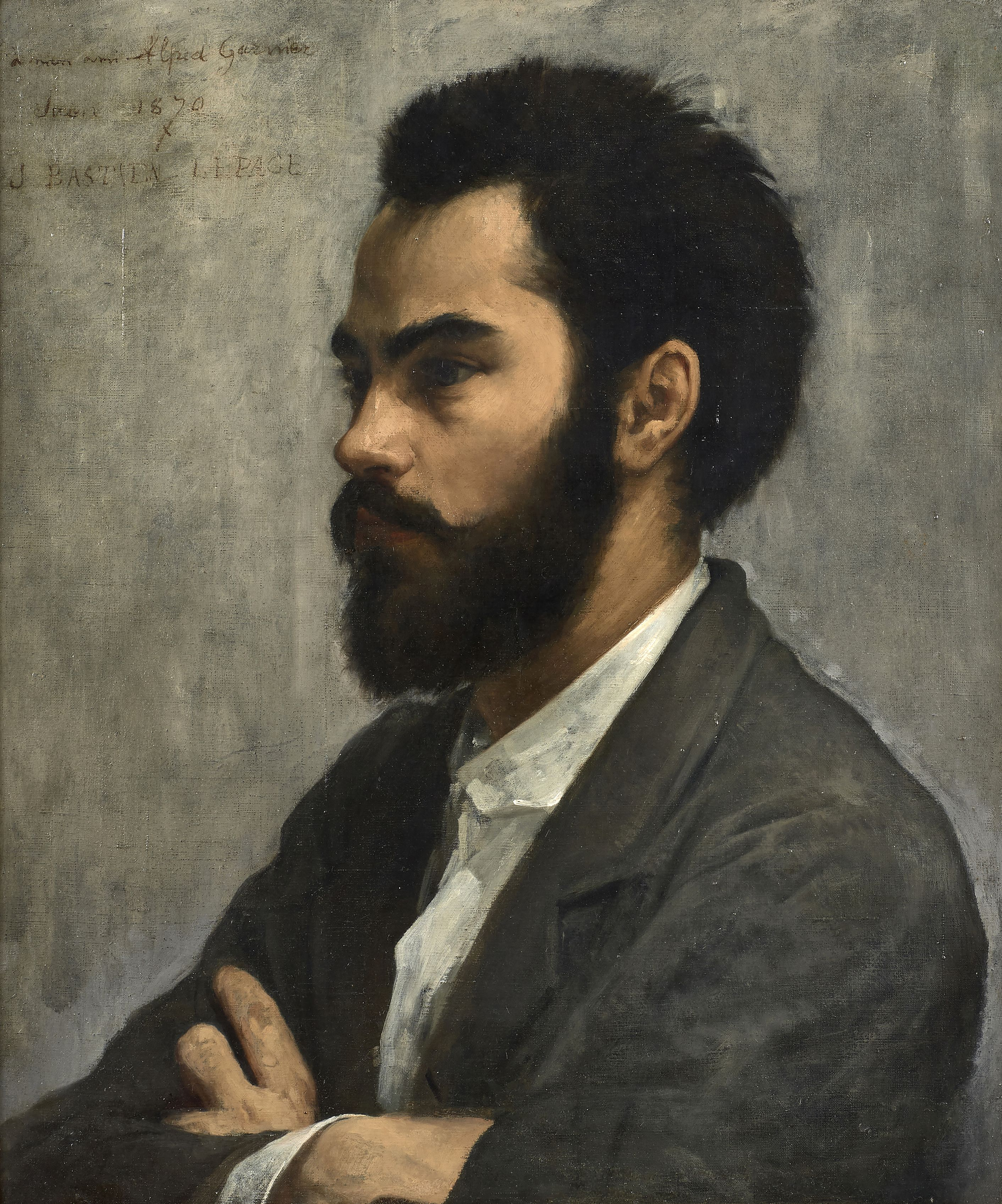
Portrait of Alfred Garnier by Jules Bastien-Lepage, June 1870

Alfred Jean Garnier (1848–1908) was a French enameller, and pupil and collaborator of Paul Grandhomme.

He was born in Puiseaux, Loiret and died in Bazoches, Nièvre. He was a painter, engraver and enameler. He was a student of Cabanel and presented at the Salon de Paris in 1874 and 1878. Several of his works are exhibited at the Musée d'Orsay.

One of his most famous works is of a man supposed to be the poet Arthur Rimbaud.

He was a friend of the sculptor Augustus Saint-Gaudens, meeting him at the École des Beaux-Arts, along with Albert Dammouse, holidaying with them in France and Switzerland.
