= Colin de Grandhomme =

New Zealand cricketer

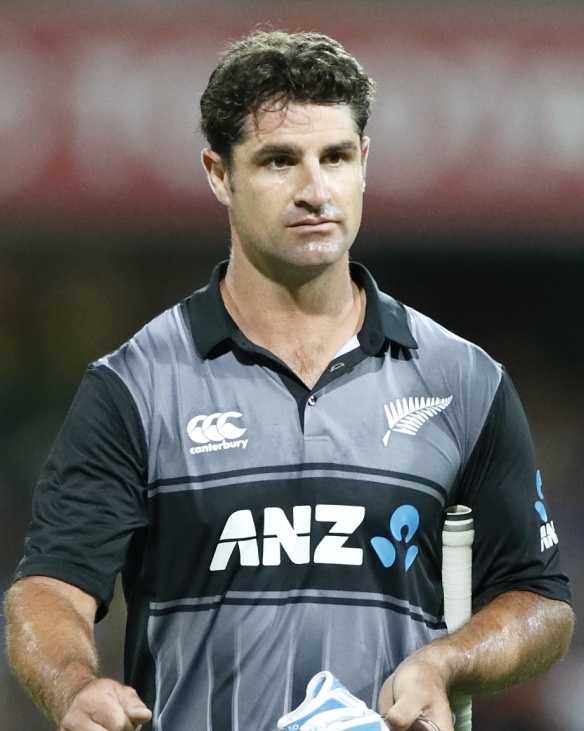
- de Grandhomme in 2018

Personal information
- Full name: Colin de Grandhomme
- Born: 22 July 1986 (age 40); Harare, Zimbabwe
- Height: 1.84 m (6 ft 0 in)
- Batting: Right-handed
- Bowling: Right-arm medium-fast
- Role: All-rounder
- Relatives: Laurence de Grandhomme (father); Bunny de Grandhomme (great-uncle)

International information
- National side: New Zealand (2012–2022)
- Test debut (cap 270): 17 November 2016 v Pakistan
- Last Test: 2 June 2022 v England
- ODI debut (cap 173): 3 March 2012 v South Africa
- Last ODI: 4 April 2022 v Netherlands
- ODI shirt no.: 77 (formerly 71)
- T20I debut (cap 52): 11 February 2012 v Zimbabwe
- Last T20I: 10 September 2021 v Bangladesh
- T20I shirt no.: 77 (formerly 71)

Domestic team information
- Years: Team
- 2004/05: Manicaland
- 2005/06: Midlands
- 2006/07–2017/18: Auckland
- 2012: Nagenahira Nagas
- 2017: Kolkata Knight Riders
- 2017–2018: Warwickshire
- 2018–2019: Royal Challengers Bangalore
- 2018: Jamaica Tallawahs
- 2018/19–2022/23: Northern Districts
- 2019: St Lucia Zouks
- 2021: Hampshire
- 2021: Southern Brave
- 2022: Surrey
- 2022/23: Adelaide Strikers
- 2023: Lancashire

Career statistics
Competition	Test	ODI	T20I	FC
Matches	29	45	41	129
Runs scored	1,432	742	505	6,765
Batting average	38.70	26.50	15.78	37.79
100s/50s	2/8	0/4	0/3	15/38
Top score	120*	74*	59	174*
Balls bowled	4,054	1,548	321	14,089
Wickets	49	30	12	212
Bowling average	32.95	41.00	38.41	29.51
5 wickets in innings	1	0	0	2
10 wickets in match	0	0	0	0
Best bowling	6/41	3/26	2/22	6/24
Catches/stumpings	19/–	17/–	20/–	114/–
Medal record
Men's Cricket
Representing New Zealand
ICC Cricket World Cup
Runner-up	2019 England and Wales
ICC World Test Championship
Winner	2019-2021
- Source: ESPNcricinfo, 20 December 2022

Colin de Grandhomme (born 22 July 1986) is a Zimbabwean-born former New Zealand international cricketer. He was a member of the New Zealand teams that won the 2019–2021 ICC World Test Championship and finished as runners-up in the 2019 Cricket World Cup. He was highly rated by New Zealand cricket for his explosive aggressive batting abilities who could swing the bat by batting lower down the order as he was tailor made for such role in his international career. He also cemented his place as a regular mainstay of the New Zealand team in across all three formats for his gentle disciplined medium pace bowling. He qualified to play for New Zealand through residency. His father Laurence de Grandhomme was also a cricketer who played first-class matches in Zimbabwe. His great-uncle Bunny de Grandhomme also played first-class cricket.

== Early, domestic and T20 career ==
Born in Harare, de Grandhomme, who attended St. George's College, Harare, began his career by playing for Manicaland in Zimbabwe, and was part of the Zimbabwe team at the 2004 Under-19 Cricket World Cup in Bangladesh. He also represented Zimbabwe U-23 team in age group cricket and one of his memorable knocks came when representing Zimbabwe U-23 team which was a century against South Africa’s Eastern Province. Colin made his List A debut playing for Manicaland against Namibia on 12 November 2004 during the 2004/05 Faithwear Clothing Inter-Provincial One-Day Competition and he opened the batting on his List A debut and scored an unbeaten innings of 96 off 136 deliveries to help his team to chase down a modest target of 199 runs. He made his first-class debut playing for Zimbabwe A against Kenya on 11 October 2005. On his first-class debut, he batted at number four position with middling returns with the bat.

Before Colin had switched his allegiance from Zimbabwe to New Zealand in pursuit of better opportunities, his father Laurence de Grandhomme had pinned hopes on his son Colin that he would represent Zimbabwe senior team in international cricket. It was revealed that he was approached by a scout who convinced and persuaded him to move to New Zealand as it happened on a serendipitous manner just after he had finished his schooling. He played for Auckland in New Zealand domestic cricket from 2006 until 2018. He made his T20 debut playing for Auckland against Otago on 4 February 2007 during the 2007 State Twenty20 final. 2008-09 season turned out to be a career defining season as far as Colin de Grandhomme was concerned as he averaged 55 with the bat and close to 24 with the ball and during the same season, his all-round exploits propelled Auckland to win the State Championship that year.

He received his maiden call-up to join New Zealand test squad in 2016 after helping his domestic Club team Auckland to chase down 373 in the fourth innings with an unbeaten knock of 144 which came after facing just 147 balls. In 2017, he played in England for Warwickshire County Cricket Club after having played for Kolkata Knight Riders in the 2017 Indian Premier League. In May 2018, he signed for Northern Districts ahead of the 2018–19 New Zealand domestic season. He played for Royal Challengers Bangalore in the 2018 and 2019 IPL seasons. In May 2021, he was signed by Hampshire for the T20 Blast. In 2021, he was drafted by Southern Brave for the inaugural season of The Hundred. In 2023 it was announced that de Grandhomme would be playing for Lancashire in both the County Championship and the T20 Blast. In Legends League Cricket he is playing for Manipal Tigers.

Following his international retirement, he plied his trade in franchise cricket and he was immediately signed up by Adelaide Strikers in the Big Bash League overseas players' draft. Colin was apparently signed by Adelaide Strikers for the 2022–23 Big Bash League season despite him being in the New Zealand cricket's contracted list of players and soon after being drafted by the franchise, he informed New Zealand Cricket that he has decided to hang his boots in international cricket in pursuit of franchise T20 tournaments. As a result, New Zealand Cricket agreed to release Colin from their central contract as he convinced the New Zealand cricket chiefs that he had been consistently struggling with injury concerns which makes it difficult for him to actively take part in training sessions.

== International career ==
After representing Zimbabwe in the U19 World Cup, de Grandhomme moved to New Zealand in 2006, making his international debut on 11 February 2012 in a Twenty20 International against his country of birth Zimbabwe. His One Day International (ODI) debut came against South Africa on 3 March 2012 and he struck a quickfire innings of 36 in 36 balls and he also smashed three sixes during the blitz.

After playing just a solitary ODI match in 2012, he had to wait for four and a half years to make a comeback return to the New Zealand ODI team and he played his second ODI in December 2016. Since December 2016, he became a formidable member of the New Zealand ODI squad in bilateral series and ICC tournaments. Since his test debut in November 2016, he became a regular member of the New Zealand in across all formats. In November 2016, de Grandhomme was named in New Zealand's Test squad for the team against the touring Pakistanis and debuted in the first Test match on 17 November. He scored a half-century and took a five-wicket haul on debut, winning the player of the match award. His bowling figures of 6/41 on his test debut, literally restricted Pakistan to 133 all out and he shattered the 65 year old New Zealand record for the best bowling figures by a bowler playing for New Zealand on test debut, surpassing the previous record of 6/155 held by Alex Moir who achieved the feat against England in 1951. He also became the eighth New Zealand bowler to take a five-wicket haul on test debut and he finished the match with overall figures of 7/64.

He was included in New Zealand squad for the 2017 ICC Champions Trophy, but he was benched throughout the tournament as New Zealand opted for the services of Corey Anderson and James Neesham throughout the course of the tournament. On 2 December 2017, against the touring West Indies, de Grandhomme scored his first Test century. The 71-ball century was the second-fastest century in Tests by a New Zealand batsman. He left the tour ahead of the ODI matches against the West Indies after the death of his father in Zimbabwe.

In May 2018, de Grandhomme was one of twenty players to be awarded a new contract for the 2018–19 season by New Zealand Cricket. In April 2019, he was named in New Zealand's squad for the 2019 Cricket World Cup. He was a vital cog of New Zealand team in their memorable run at the 2019 World Cup with his all-round exploits. During a group stage fixture, between South Africa and New Zealand during 2019 World Cup, he scored a 39 ball half-century in a lifeless pitch for the batters as most of the frontline batters from both the teams had faltered in the two-paced pitch on the slowish team of the surface. He stitched a crucial partnership with his skipper Kane Williamson to take New Zealand home in a low scoring tense match against South Africa and he remained unbeaten with a blistering innings of 60. During the 2019 World Cup final, he made life difficult for England premiere batsman Joe Root as his plan to bowl gentle slow cutters reaped rewards and Root fell prey to the tactical ploy of Colin de Grandhomme, with Root having only managed to muster 7 runs facing 22 balls. Colin's match-winning spell in the 2019 World Cup final changed the complexion of the game and turned the game in New Zealand's favour before an onslaught from Ben Stokes took the game down the wire all the way to a super over finish.

In 2021, he faced slump in his batting form especially when he endured a lean patch with a string of single digit scores in a five-match T20I bilateral series against Bangladesh. He also missed the entirety of New Zealand's 2020-21 home summer due to an ankle injury for which he underwent a surgery and the surgery eventually kept him out of the team for further six weeks.

He announced his retirement from international cricket on 31 August 2022.

== See also ==
- List of New Zealand cricketers who have taken five-wicket hauls on Test debut
