= Marie-Alfred de Suin =

French admiral (1796–1861)

Marie-Alfred de Suin (Marie-Jean-Baptiste-Alfred de Suin) (April 1796 - 1861) was a French sailor.

He became Rear Admiral in May 1849 and, from 1851 to 1854, he commanded the French naval division of Brazil and La Plata and he contributed to the organization of this last country after the retirement of Rosas.

In 1855, he was appointed to the grade of Vice Admiral. He was Commander of the Legion of Honor. He is also the father of the author Diane de Beausacq.
