= Laurence de Grandhomme =

Zimbabwean cricketer (1956–2017)

Personal information
- Born: 22 November 1956; Ndola, Northern Rhodesia
- Died: 13 December 2017 (aged 61); Zimbabwe
- Relatives: Colin de Grandhomme (son)
- Source: ESPNcricinfo, 18 November 2016

Laurence de Grandhomme (22 November 1956 – 13 December 2017) was a Zimbabwean cricketer. He played sixteen first-class and eight List A matches for Zimbabwe between 1979 and 1989. His son, Colin, played international cricket for New Zealand.
