= Jules Brateau =

French sculptor and jeweller (1844–1923)

Jules Brateau (also known as Jules Paul Brateau, 2 November 1844 in Bourges – 23 October 1923 in Fécamp) was a French sculptor, goldsmith, jeweller and pewter-worker.

Brateau was part of a revival in the use of pewter in decorative objects, and won a gold medal at the 1889 Universal Exposition. After training as a woodcarver under Honorè Bourdoncle, from 1874 he worked as an engraver for jewellery companies such as Vever and Boucheron. In 1878 he began to work in pewter. He was made a member of Légion d'honneur in 1894, and was a member of the jury at the 1900 Universal Exposition. His work, L'Olivier (The Olive Tree) was one of two pieces chosen to represent pewterwork at the 1900 Universal Exposition.

Several of his creations are part of the Musée d'Orsay collection and some are found in the Metropolitan Museum of Art.
