= Rosička =

Rosička may refer to places in the Czech Republic:

- Rosička (Jindřichův Hradec District), a municipality and village in the South Bohemian Region
- Rosička (Žďár nad Sázavou District), a municipality and village in the Vysočina Region
- Hadravova Rosička, a municipality and village in the South Bohemian Region
