= Vícemil =

- Municipality
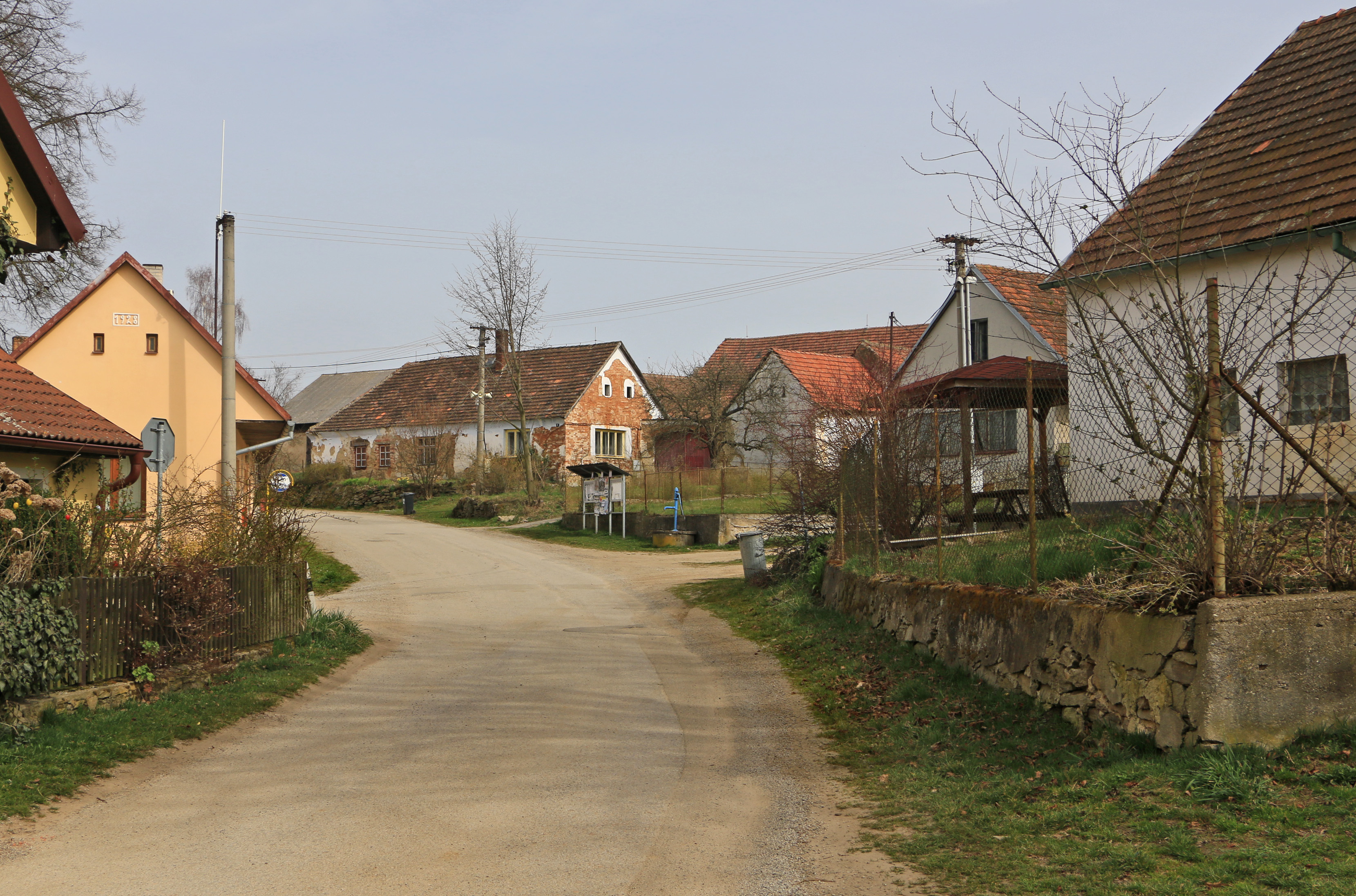
- Main street

- Location in the Czech Republic
- Coordinates: 49°15′50″N 14°53′39″E
- Country: Czech Republic
- Region: South Bohemian
- District: Jindřichův Hradec
- First mentioned: 1378

Area
  - Total: 3.82 km^{2} (1.47 sq mi)
- Elevation: 540 m (1,770 ft)

Population (2026-01-01)
  - Total: 69
  - Density: 18/km^{2} (47/sq mi)
- Time zone: UTC+1 (CET)
  - Summer (DST): UTC+2 (CEST)
- Postal code: 378 21
- Website: www.obec-vicemil.cz

Vícemil is a municipality and village in Jindřichův Hradec District in the South Bohemian Region of the Czech Republic. It has about 70 inhabitants.

Vícemil lies approximately 15 kilometres (9 mi) north-west of Jindřichův Hradec, 45 km (28 mi) north-east of České Budějovice, and 98 km (61 mi) south of Prague.

== Demographics ==
Historical population
Year	Pop.	±%
1869	163	—
1880	163	+0.0%
1890	147	−9.8%
1900	174	+18.4%
1910	159	−8.6%
1921	117	−26.4%
1930	129	+10.3%
1950	88	−31.8%
1961	149	+69.3%
1970	126	−15.4%
1980	107	−15.1%
1991	96	−10.3%
2001	93	−3.1%
2011	84	−9.7%
2021	79	−6.0%
Source: Censuses
