= Příbraz =

- Municipality
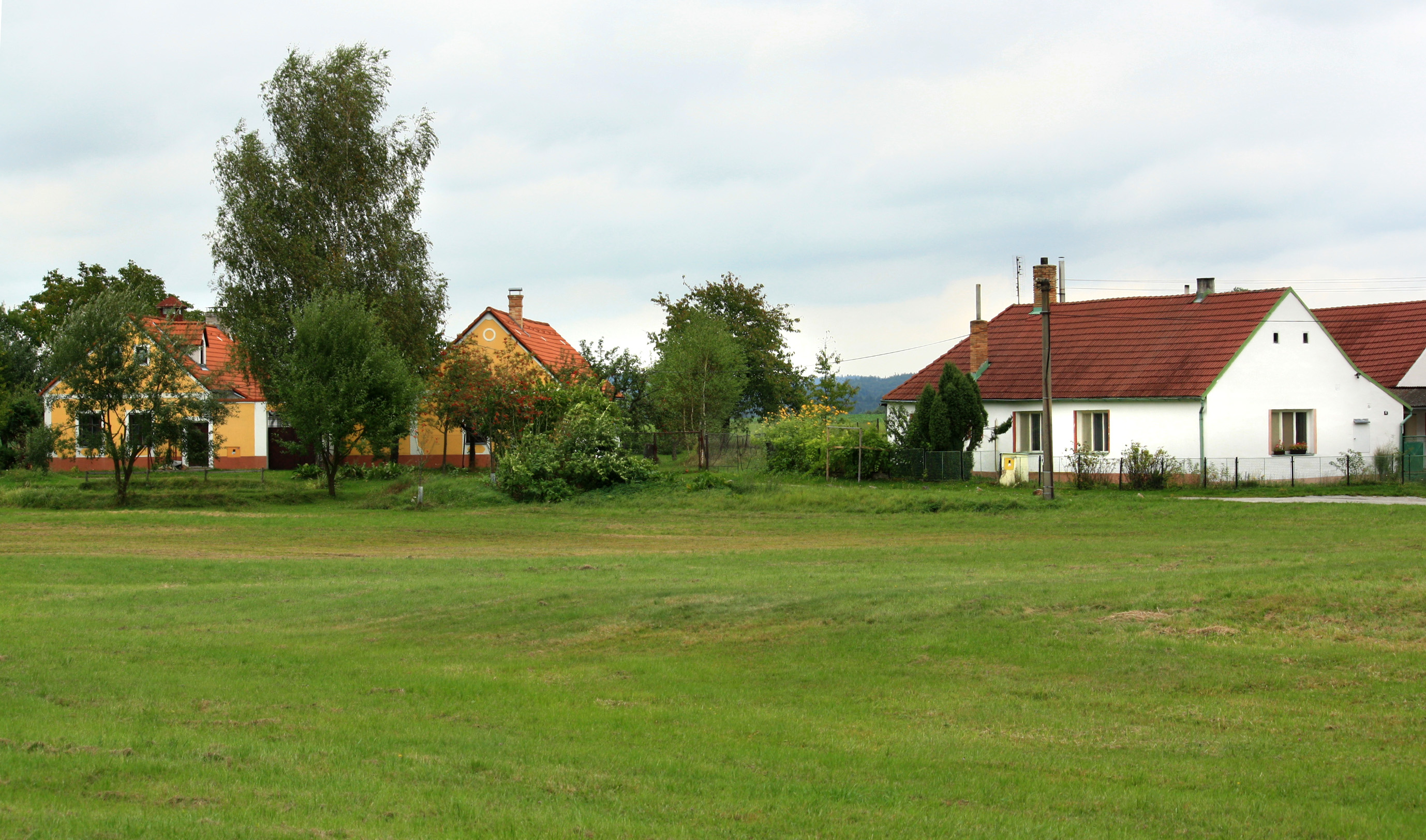
- Eastern part of Příbraz

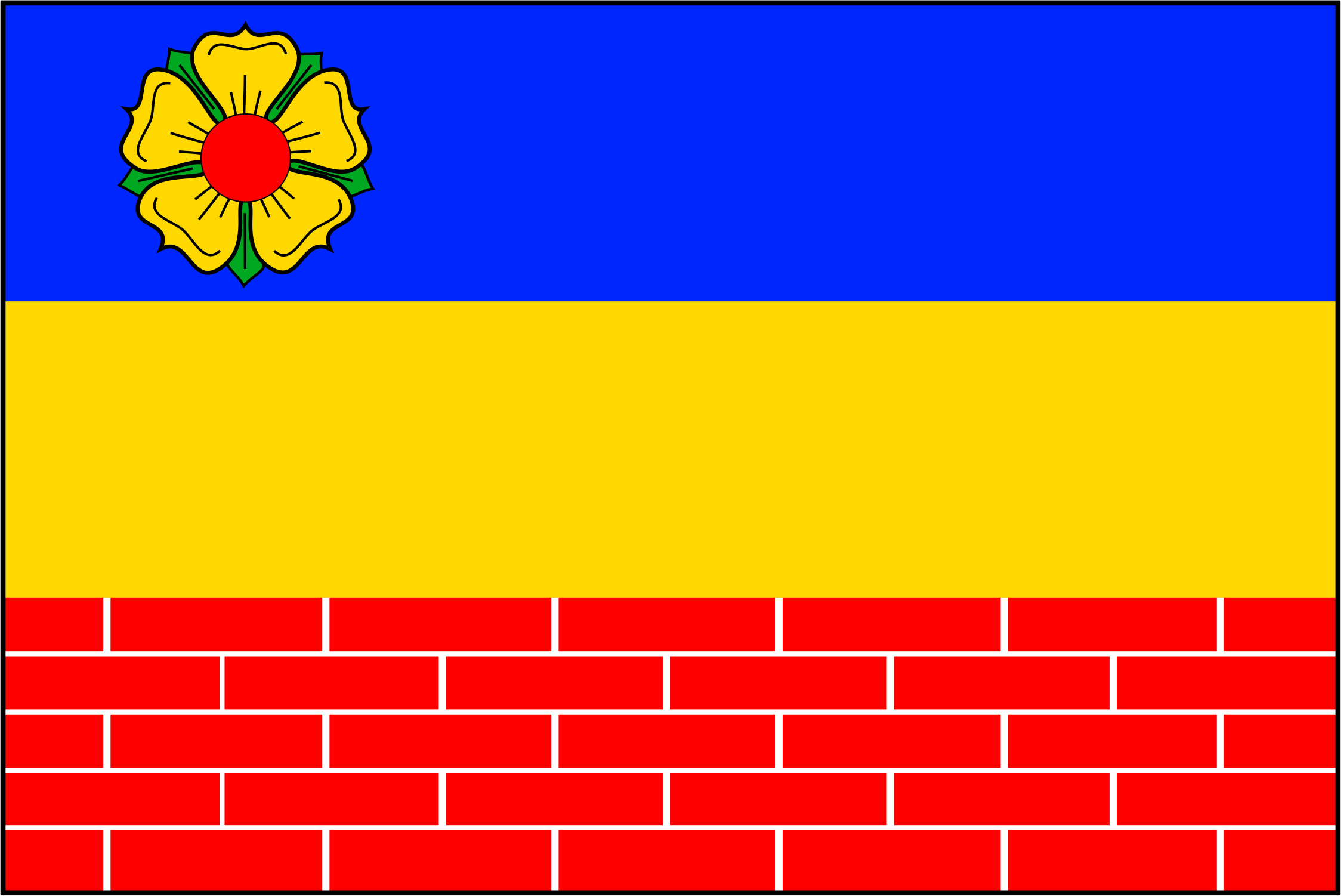
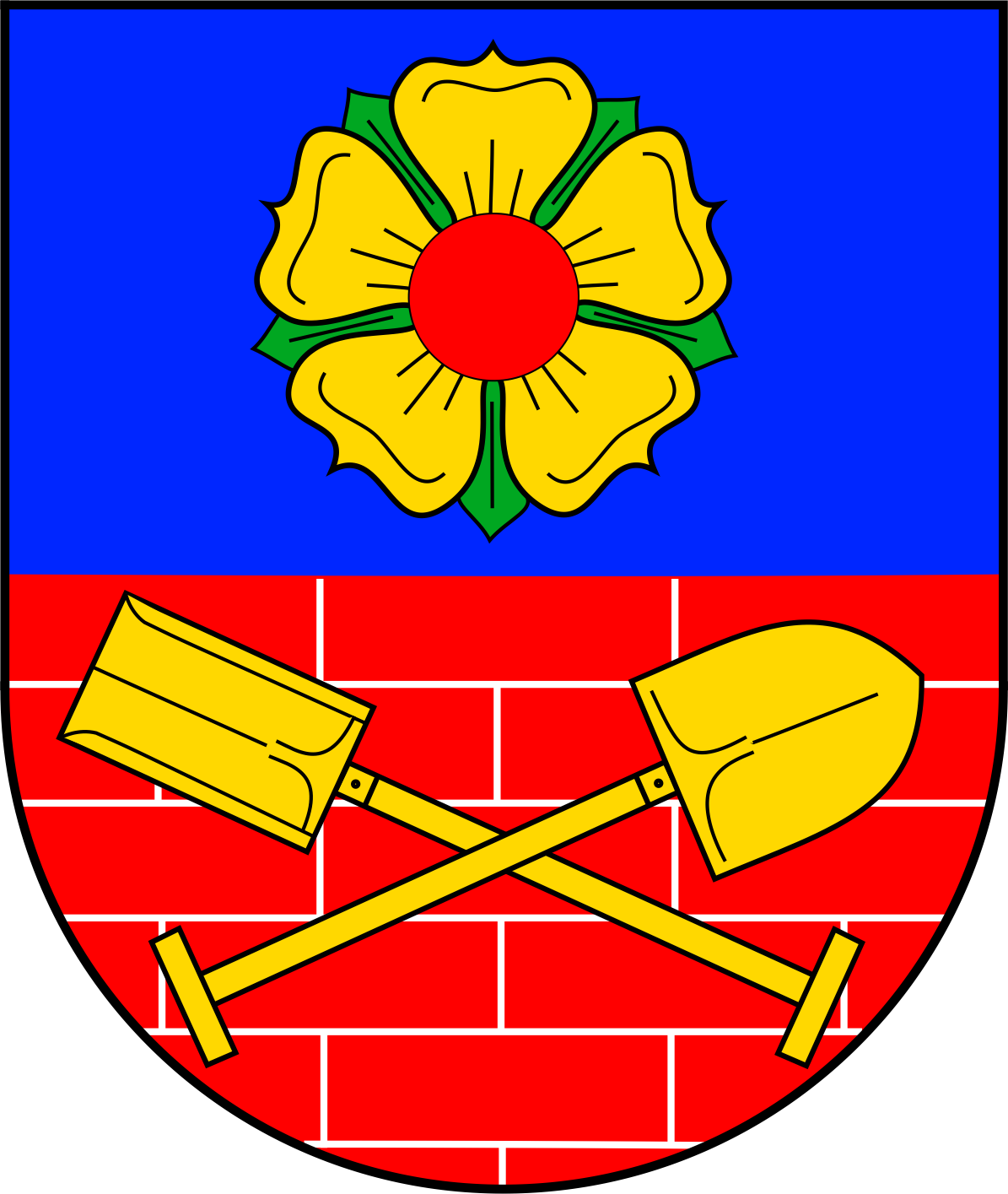
- Flag Coat of arms

- Location in the Czech Republic
- Coordinates: 49°3′5″N 14°56′15″E
- Country: Czech Republic
- Region: South Bohemian
- District: Jindřichův Hradec
- First mentioned: 1518

Area
  - Total: 7.11 km^{2} (2.75 sq mi)
- Elevation: 468 m (1,535 ft)

Population (2026-01-01)
  - Total: 270
  - Density: 38/km^{2} (98/sq mi)
- Time zone: UTC+1 (CET)
  - Summer (DST): UTC+2 (CEST)
- Postal code: 378 02
- Website: www.pribraz.cz

Příbraz is a municipality and village in Jindřichův Hradec District in the South Bohemian Region of the Czech Republic. It has about 300 inhabitants. The centre of the village is well preserved and is protected as a village monument zone.

Příbraz lies approximately 13 kilometres (8 mi) south-west of Jindřichův Hradec, 35 km (22 mi) east of České Budějovice, and 122 km (76 mi) south of Prague.

== Demographics ==
Historical population
Year	Pop.	±%
1869	594	—
1880	673	+13.3%
1890	712	+5.8%
1900	743	+4.4%
1910	757	+1.9%
1921	622	−17.8%
1930	591	−5.0%
1950	466	−21.2%
1961	422	−9.4%
1970	318	−24.6%
1980	248	−22.0%
1991	199	−19.8%
2001	221	+11.1%
2011	246	+11.3%
2021	275	+11.8%
Source: Censuses
