= Church of Sts. Simon and Jude (Prague) =

Coordinates: 50.0919°N 14.4206°E

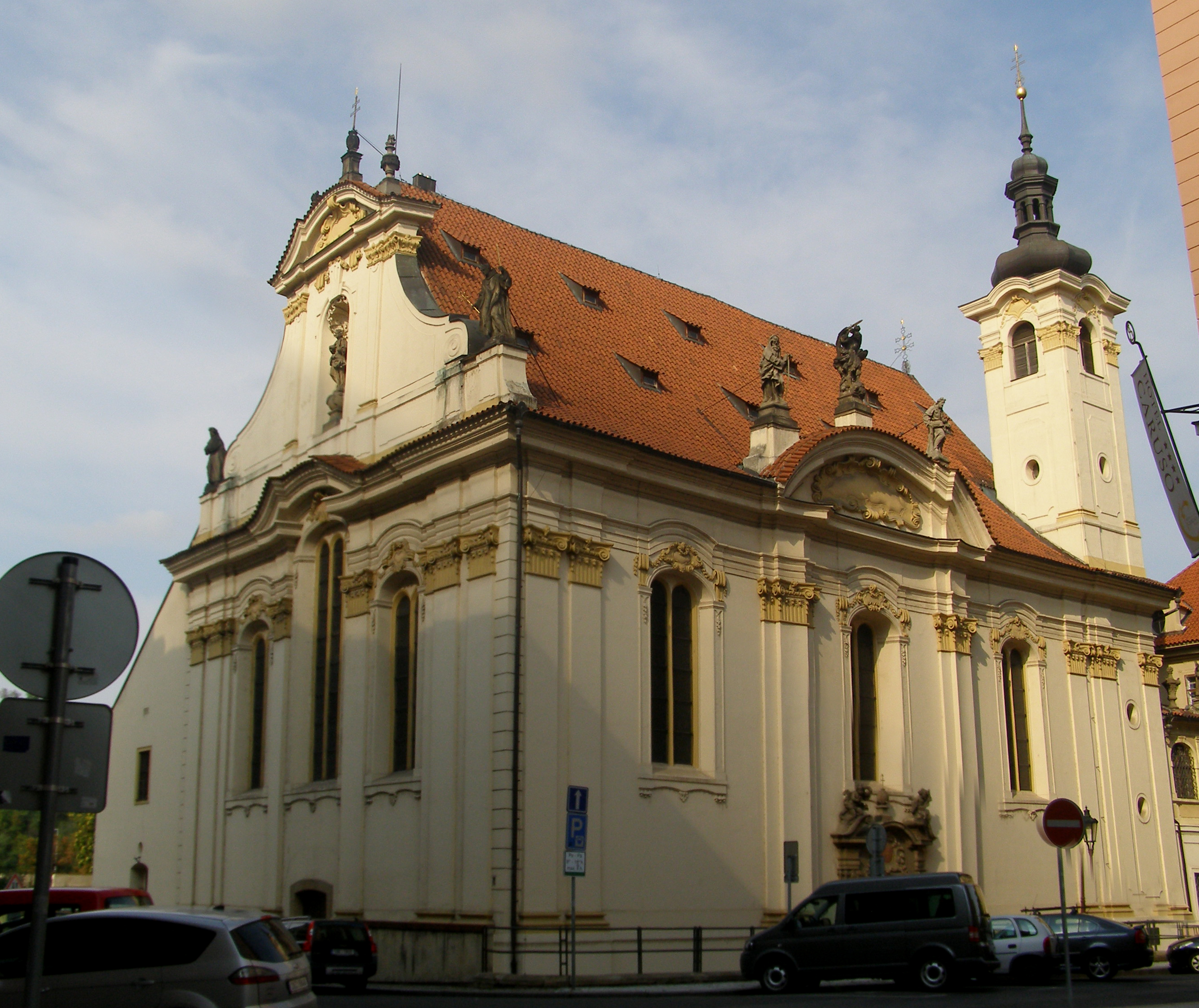
The church in 2012

The Church of Sts. Simon and Jude (Czech: Kostel svatého Šimona a Judy), situated next to the Brutalist Hotel InterContinental on U Milosrdných Street in the Old Town of Prague, dates back to 1354, when a hospital was founded on the site. The building was adjoined by a chapel that was sanctified by bishop Arnošt of Pardubice, a close friend of Emperor Charles IV.

== History ==
In 1615–1920 the chapel was significantly enlarged to a hall construction with galleries and chapels, and windows in the Late Gothic style were added. In 1620 the new church, a mixture of Gothic and Renaissance styles, was erected by members of the Protestant sect Bohemian Brethren, was consecrated on July 14 of that year, and, after Battle of White Mountain, was (together with the adjoined St. Francis Hospital, Na Františku) entrusted as a Christmas gift by Emperor Ferdinand II to the Brothers Hospitallers of Saint John of God, who to this day own the complex.

About a century later Sts. Simon and Jude was remodelled in the High Baroque style, apparent to this day in its interior decorations—altars, statues, the pulpit, tromp d’oeil murals and marquetry, and in the loft was installed a pipe organ by Andreas Wambetsser of north Bohemia, which in combination with the sanctuary's acoustics would attract W. A. Mozart and J. Haydn to perform there. Among artists involved were Ferdinand Maxmilián Brokoff, Josef Hager and V. V. Reiner, author of the main altar piece.

The widely read author Alois Jirásek, whose works would later be coopted by the Communist Party and reissued as required textbooks, wrote about the Church of Sts. Simon and Jude and the hospital to which it is adjoined in his 5-volume historical novel F. L. Věk (1891–1906). In 1847, per Jirásek's account, a medical surgeon named Celestine Opitz performed the world's first operation under anesthesia at St. Francis, consequently enabling the hospital and church to draw support from Tomas Garrigue Masaryk, Edvard Benes and Pope Pius XI. Among Opitz' colleagues at St. Francis was the surgeon/composer Jan Theobald Held, a musical figure made famous by his patriotic characterization in F. L. Věk.

== Communism ==
C. 1950 the church was deconsecrated. Over the next four decades the structure served as a warehouse.

== Post-Velvet Revolution ==
In 1989–1993, with the fall of communism, the city of Prague endeavored to restore Sts. Simon and Jude, including the installation of floor heating to facilitate comfortable use year-round. The church was never reconsecrated, and the maintenance of Sts. Simon and Jude was handed over to Prague Symphony Orchestra in exchange for its use as a concert hall. In 2000 the historic pipe organ was overhauled by organ builders Jaroslav Tůma and Vladimir Slajch, and the improved instrument was unveiled at an inaugural concert by Michal Novenko. "The sound is clearer, even more lively, thanks to the new old-fashioned bellows," Novenko told Prague Post. "The organ master needs to think in the spirit of the original organ builder. It's a solitary job, much more difficult than building a new organ."

Nowadays, chamber, choral and organ concerts are held regularly throughout the year.
