= Světce =

- Municipality
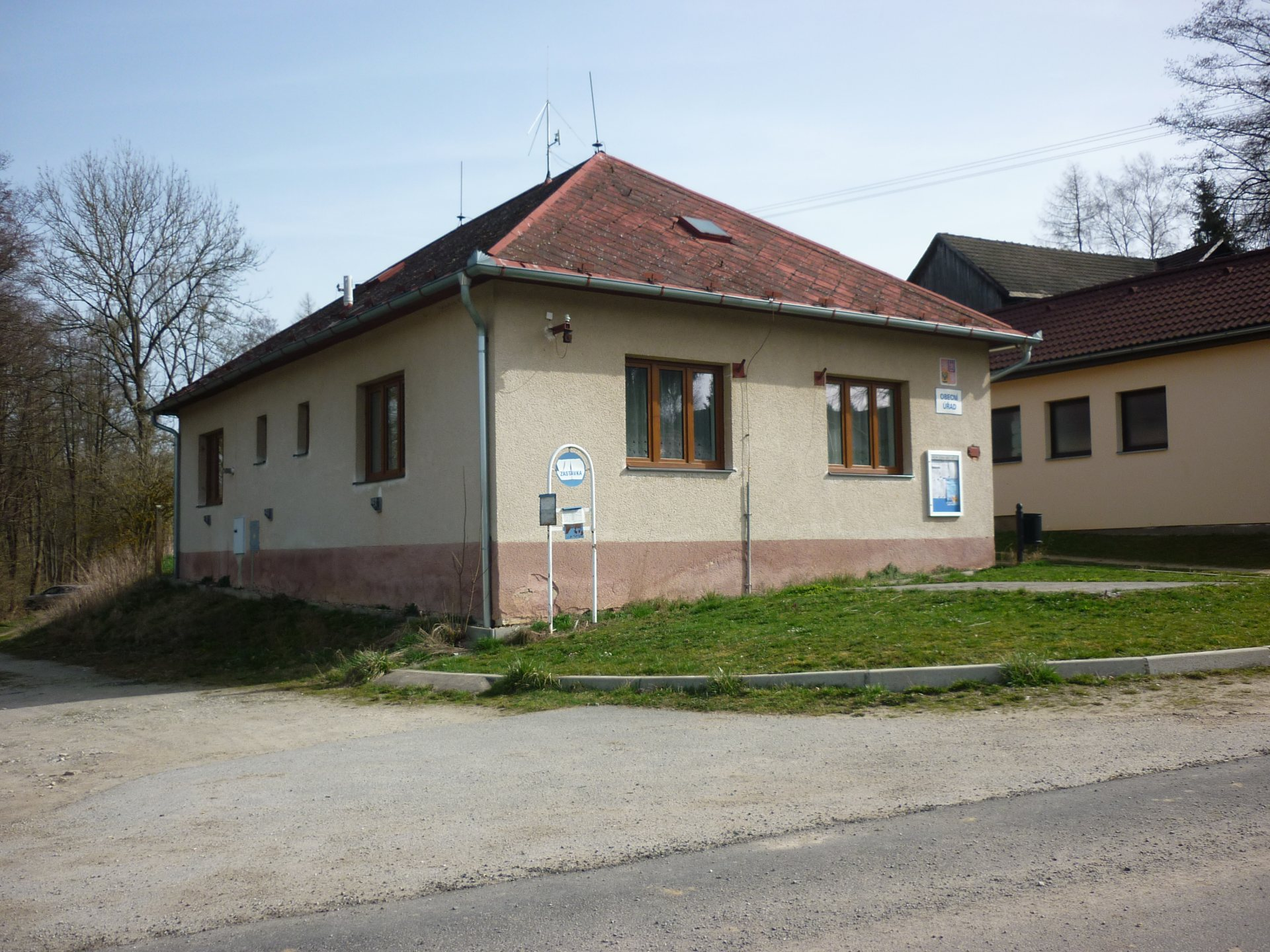
- Municipal office

- Location in the Czech Republic
- Coordinates: 49°16′14″N 14°56′29″E
- Country: Czech Republic
- Region: South Bohemian
- District: Jindřichův Hradec
- First mentioned: 1255

Area
  - Total: 7.59 km^{2} (2.93 sq mi)
- Elevation: 440 m (1,440 ft)

Population (2026-01-01)
  - Total: 133
  - Density: 17.5/km^{2} (45.4/sq mi)
- Time zone: UTC+1 (CET)
  - Summer (DST): UTC+2 (CEST)
- Postal code: 378 21
- Website: www.svetce.cz

Světce is a municipality and village in Jindřichův Hradec District in the South Bohemian Region of the Czech Republic. It has about 100 inhabitants.

Světce lies approximately 14 kilometres (9 mi) north of Jindřichův Hradec, 48 km (30 mi) north-east of České Budějovice, and 99 km (62 mi) south-east of Prague.

== Demographics ==
Historical population
Year	Pop.	±%
1869	491	—
1880	495	+0.8%
1890	456	−7.9%
1900	482	+5.7%
1910	489	+1.5%
1921	456	−6.7%
1930	412	−9.6%
1950	251	−39.1%
1961	256	+2.0%
1970	228	−10.9%
1980	197	−13.6%
1991	155	−21.3%
2001	136	−12.3%
2011	142	+4.4%
2021	133	−6.3%
Source: Censuses
