= Velký Ratmírov =

- Municipality
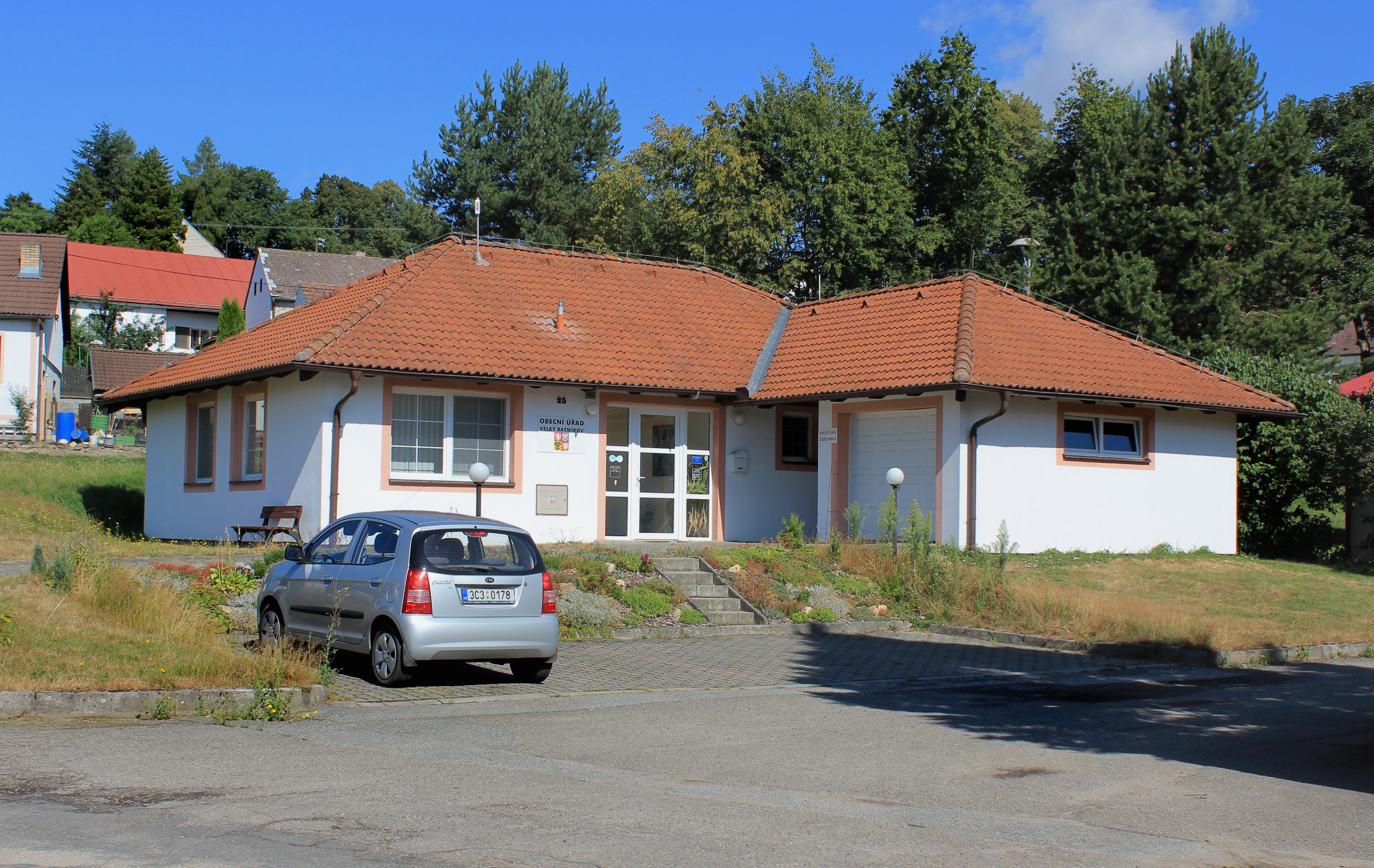
- Municipal office

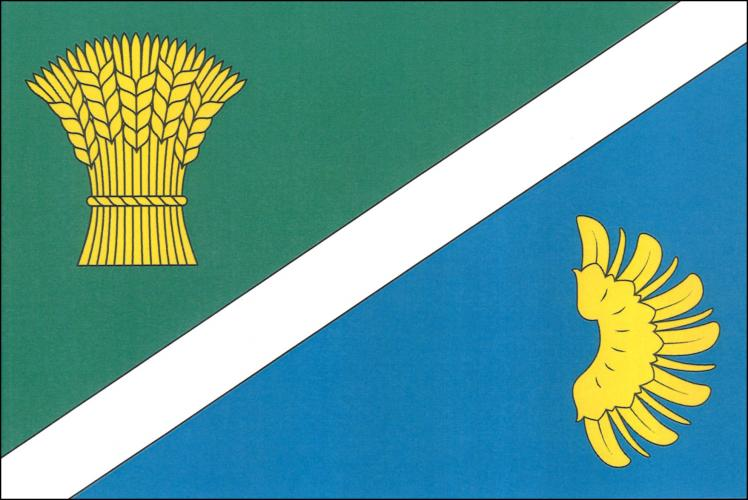
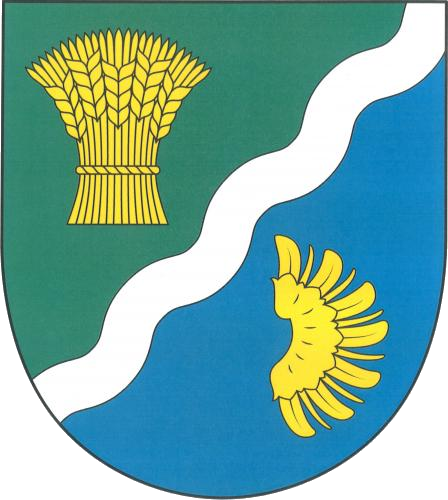
- Flag Coat of arms

- Location in the Czech Republic
- Coordinates: 49°10′40″N 14°56′15″E
- Country: Czech Republic
- Region: South Bohemian
- District: Jindřichův Hradec
- First mentioned: 1420

Area
  - Total: 13.57 km^{2} (5.24 sq mi)
- Elevation: 513 m (1,683 ft)

Population (2026-01-01)
  - Total: 232
  - Density: 17.1/km^{2} (44.3/sq mi)
- Time zone: UTC+1 (CET)
  - Summer (DST): UTC+2 (CEST)
- Postal code: 377 01
- Website: www.velkyratmirov.cz

Velký Ratmírov (German: Groß Rammerschlag) is a municipality and village in Jindřichův Hradec District in the South Bohemian Region of the Czech Republic. It has about 200 inhabitants.

Velký Ratmírov lies approximately 8 kilometres (5 mi) north-west of Jindřichův Hradec, 42 km (26 mi) north-east of České Budějovice, and 106 km (66 mi) south of Prague.

== Demographics ==
Historical population
Year	Pop.	±%
1869	506	—
1880	518	+2.4%
1890	490	−5.4%
1900	476	−2.9%
1910	420	−11.8%
1921	419	−0.2%
1930	382	−8.8%
1950	296	−22.5%
1961	275	−7.1%
1970	230	−16.4%
1980	173	−24.8%
1991	202	+16.8%
2001	210	+4.0%
2011	222	+5.7%
2021	214	−3.6%
Source: Censuses
