= Hana Voglová =

Czech translator and interpreter (1913–2005)

- Born: 20 June 1913; Třebechovice pod Orebem, Bohemia, Austria-Hungary
- Died: 20 March 2005 (aged 91)
- Other name: Hana Fischlová
- Occupations: Translator and interpreter
- Spouse: Hanuš Martin Fischl

Hana Voglová (married Hana Fischlová; 20 June 1913 – 20 March 2005) was a Czech Jewish translator. She was a member of the British Women's Auxiliary Air Corps and the 311th Czechoslovak Bomber Squadron of the British Royal Air Force. During World War II, she worked as a clerk, technical translator and interpreter in England.

== Early life and education ==
Hana Voglová was born on 20 June 1913 in Třebechovice pod Orebem into a Czech-Jewish family. Her father Karel died when she was 5 years old from injuries he sustained during World War I, so she was raised by her single mother. She was a member of the Scouts. Beginning in 1923, she studied at the grammar school and the business academy in Hradec Králové. After completing her studies, she worked at the Union Bank in Prague. She was employed there until March 1939. After the German forces occupied Czechoslovakia, Voglová left for Belfast, Northern Ireland in July 1939 for "racial reasons" to work as a nanny.

== During World War II ==
With the outbreak of World War II, Voglová joined the Women's Auxiliary Air Corps (WAAF) of the British Royal Air Force and used her English skills to work as a clerk, technical translator and interpreter as part of the 311th Czechoslovak Bomber Squadron. The women in these positions, were assigned to the regular armed forces of the British Army by royal decree in April 1941 so they could replace and release men for the growing needs of the war. Hana Voglová enlisted in the WAAF in November 1941 and began her military service a month later.

During the four years she worked with the WAAF, she maintained strong bonds with Czechoslovakia's airmen.

"Many of them visited Hana's office for coffee after air operations, during which they discussed various situations and war events. This is probably why Hana Voglová later had the idea to sew together several pieces of aviation canvas and collect the signatures of individual airmen on it. In three years, she collected over 400 signatures, many of which remained the only memory of those who never returned from their operational flights."

== After World War II ==
In March 1945, Voglová, now a sergeant, applied for repatriation back to Czechoslovakia. She returned to her home country on 11 November 1945, and discovered that her large Jewish family had been devastated by the Holocaust: her mother, sister, and brother and their families had all perished in the Nazi Auschwitz concentration camp.

She returned to work at the Union Bank, but after the 1948 communist coup, she left Czechoslovakia for the United Kingdom, where she remained for three years. Then she moved to Canada, where she married a former Czech army soldier, Hanuš Martin Fischl, and worked for the Canadian Railways. She died at 91 on 20 March 2005.

== Honors ==
Voglová was promoted to the rank of Major in the Czechoslovak Air Force in September 1991.

She was named an honorary citizen of Třebechovice pod Orebem for her "fight against fascism" during World War II.
