= Probošt's mechanical Christmas crib =

Wooden mechanical nativity scene in the Czech Republic

Coordinates: 50°12′4.64″N 15°59′38.17″E

- Proboštův betlém (Czech), Třebechovický betlém
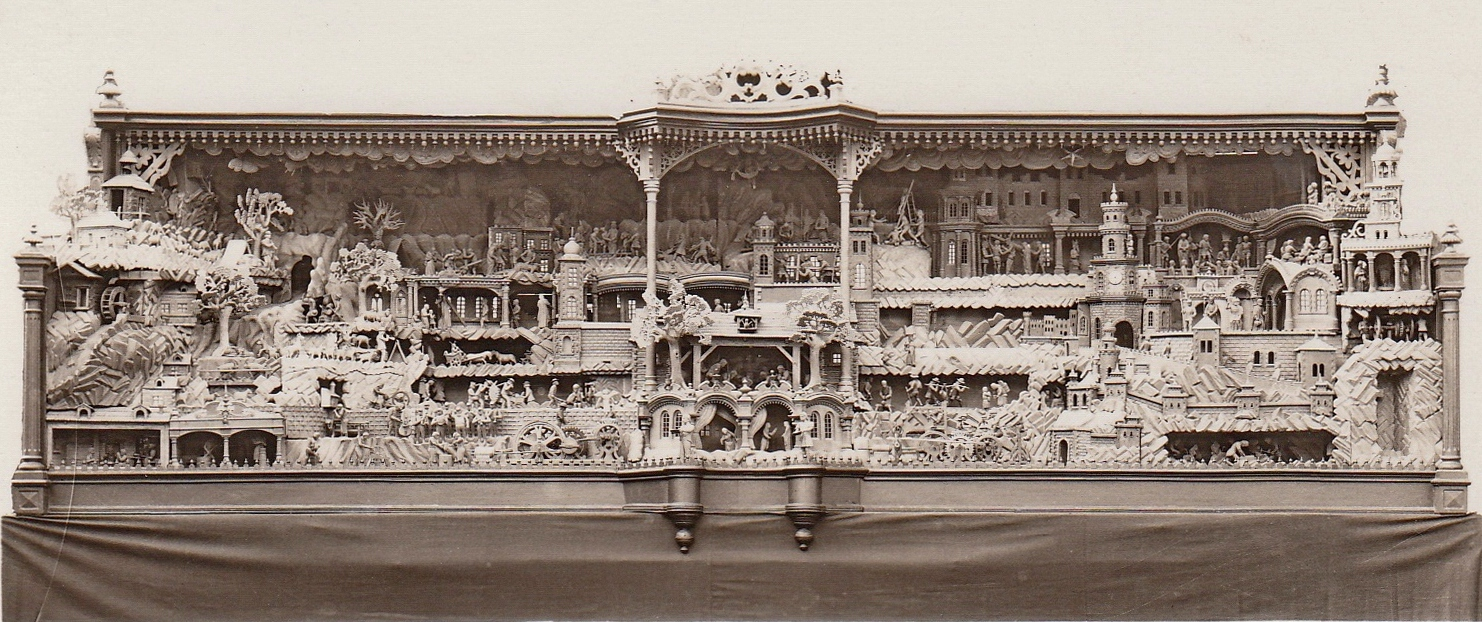
- An old postcard of the crib
- Year: 1906
- Type: Mechanical nativity scene
- Medium: Wood
- Dimensions: 2.2 m × 1.9 m × 6.9 m (7.2 ft × 6.2 ft × 23 ft)
- Location: The Museum of Nativity Scenes; Třebechovice pod Orebem

Probošt's Mechanical Christmas Crib (Czech: Proboštův betlém) is a wooden mechanical nativity scene that was made by Josef Probošt (1849–1926), Josef Kapucián (1841–1908) and Josef Friml (1861–1946).

The crib was declared a national cultural monument in 1999. It is unique in terms of art and ethnography, but also from a technical point of view. It is also notable for its great aesthetic quality, unlike most other movable cribs, which sacrificed looks for mobility.

This artifact is now housed in the Museum of Nativity Scenes in Třebechovice pod Orebem in the Czech Republic. It is among the most valuable treasures of the country.

== Exhibitions ==
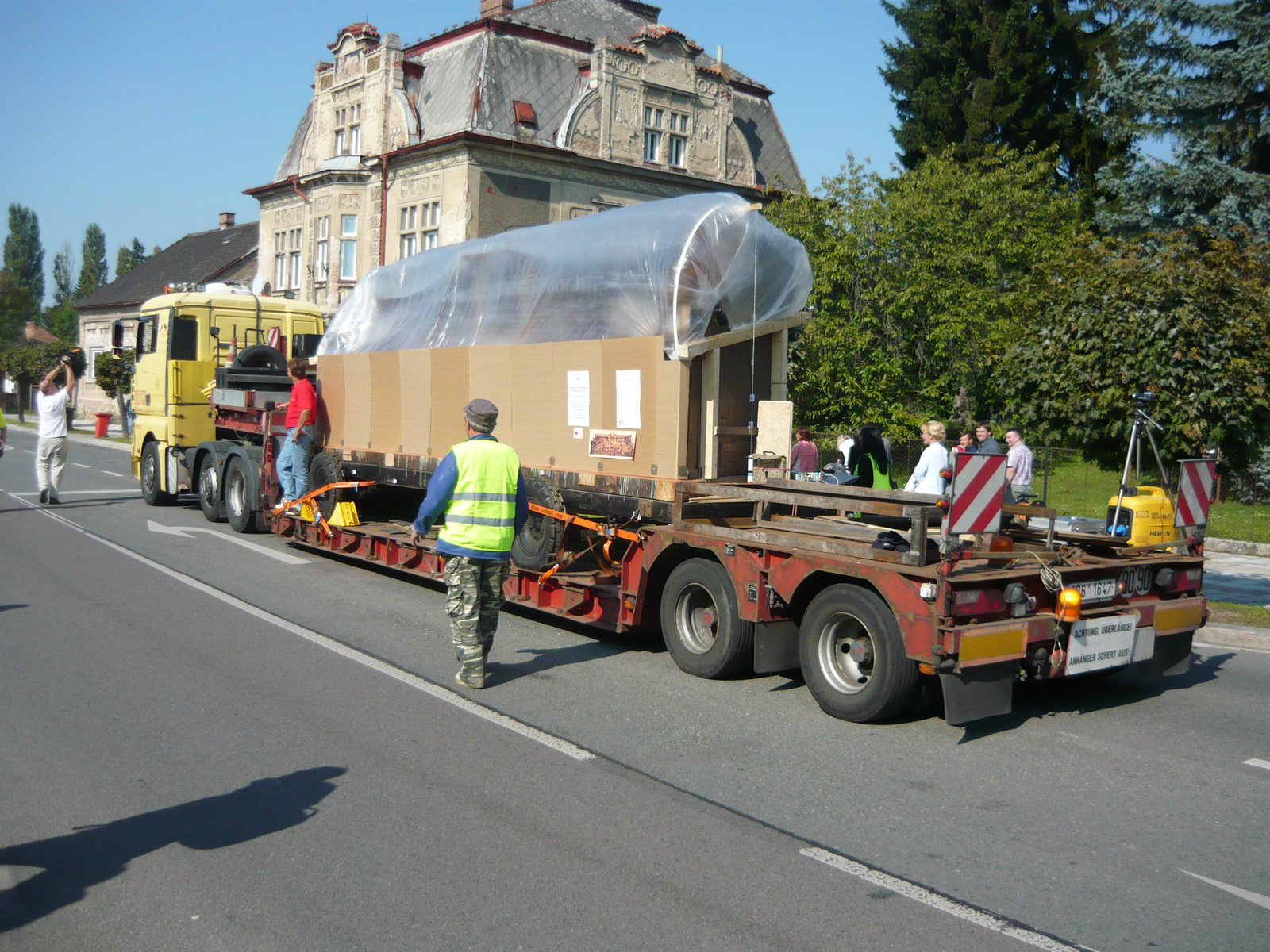
Transport of the Probošt's crib to storage on 26 September 2011

The crib was first exhibited at the Zemská jednota řemeslnická ("Provincial Artisan Union") in Chrast in 1906. There the crib was received positively, and was awarded a diploma and a gold medal; however, nobody wanted to sponsor it.

Other exhibitions were in the year 1934 in Kostelec nad Orlicí, in 1935 in Prague, in 1936 in Brno and in 1937 in Bratislava, Piešťany and Hlohovec. Continued exhibiting was interrupted by World War II. Later, the crib was exhibited at the World's fair in Montreal (1967), where more than 8 million visitors saw it, at Madurodam in The Hague (1968) and at the Ideal Home Show in London (1970). Each of these displays met with great success. Since 1972, the crib has been exhibited only at the Museum of Christmas Cribs itself.

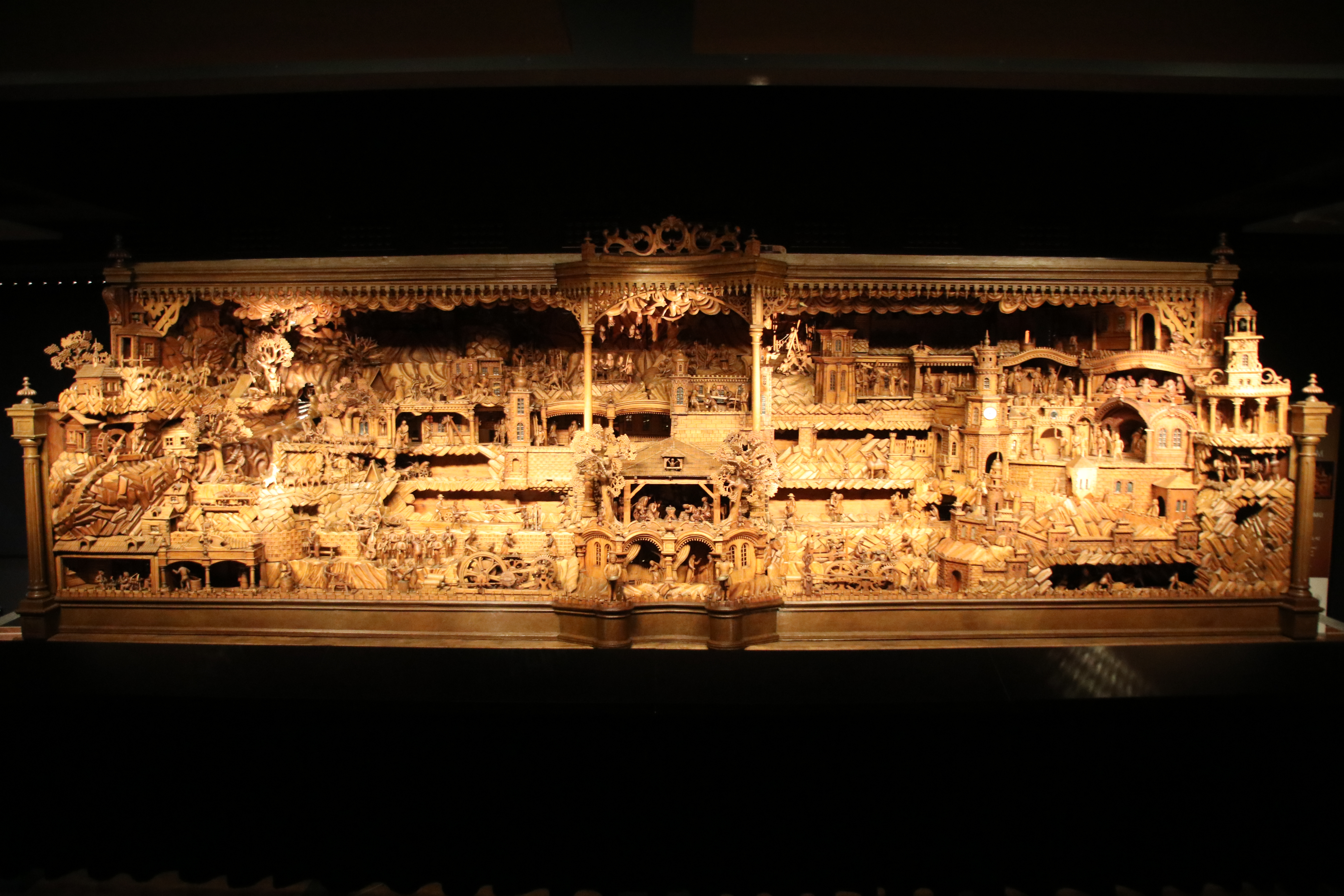
Front view

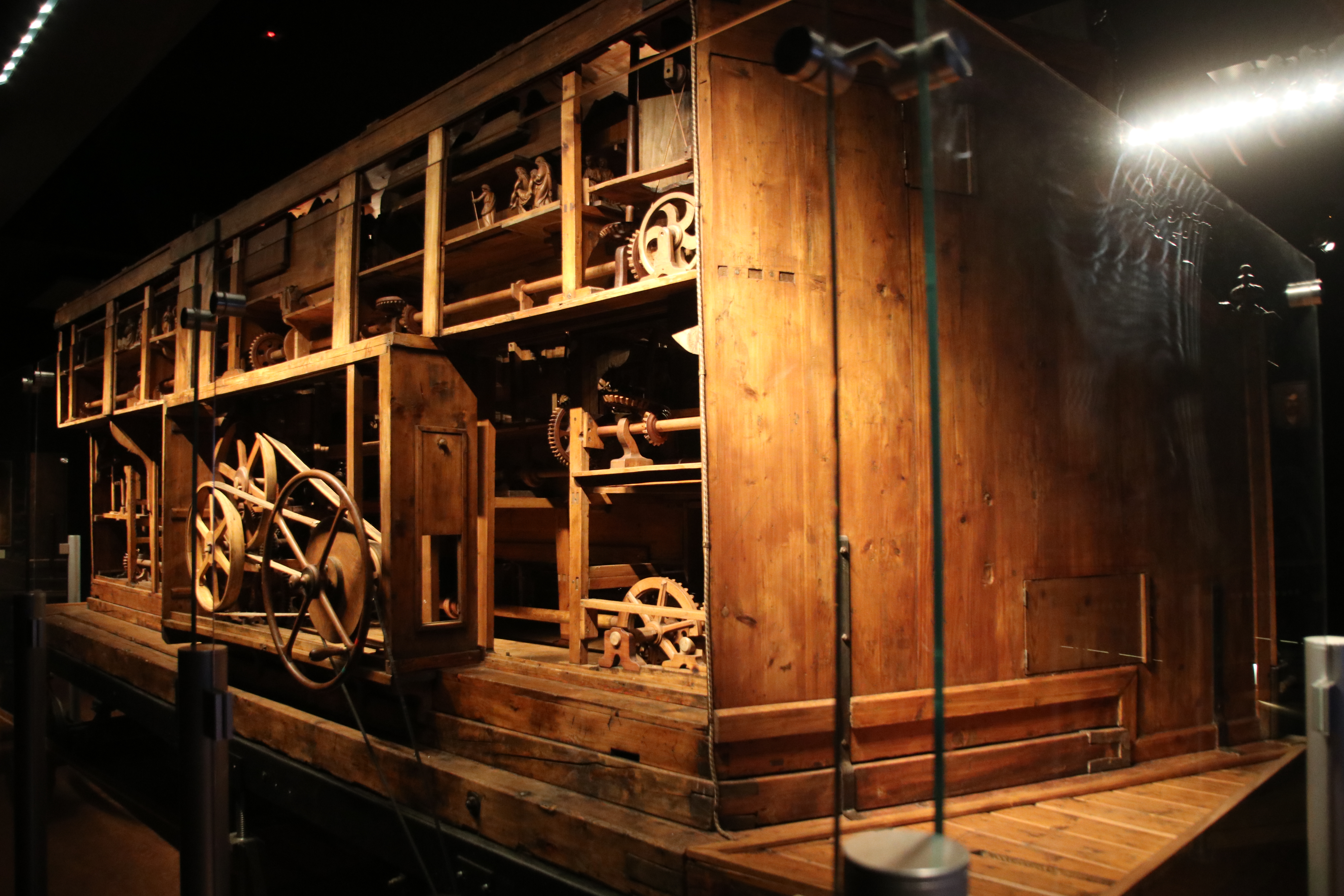
Mechanics in the back

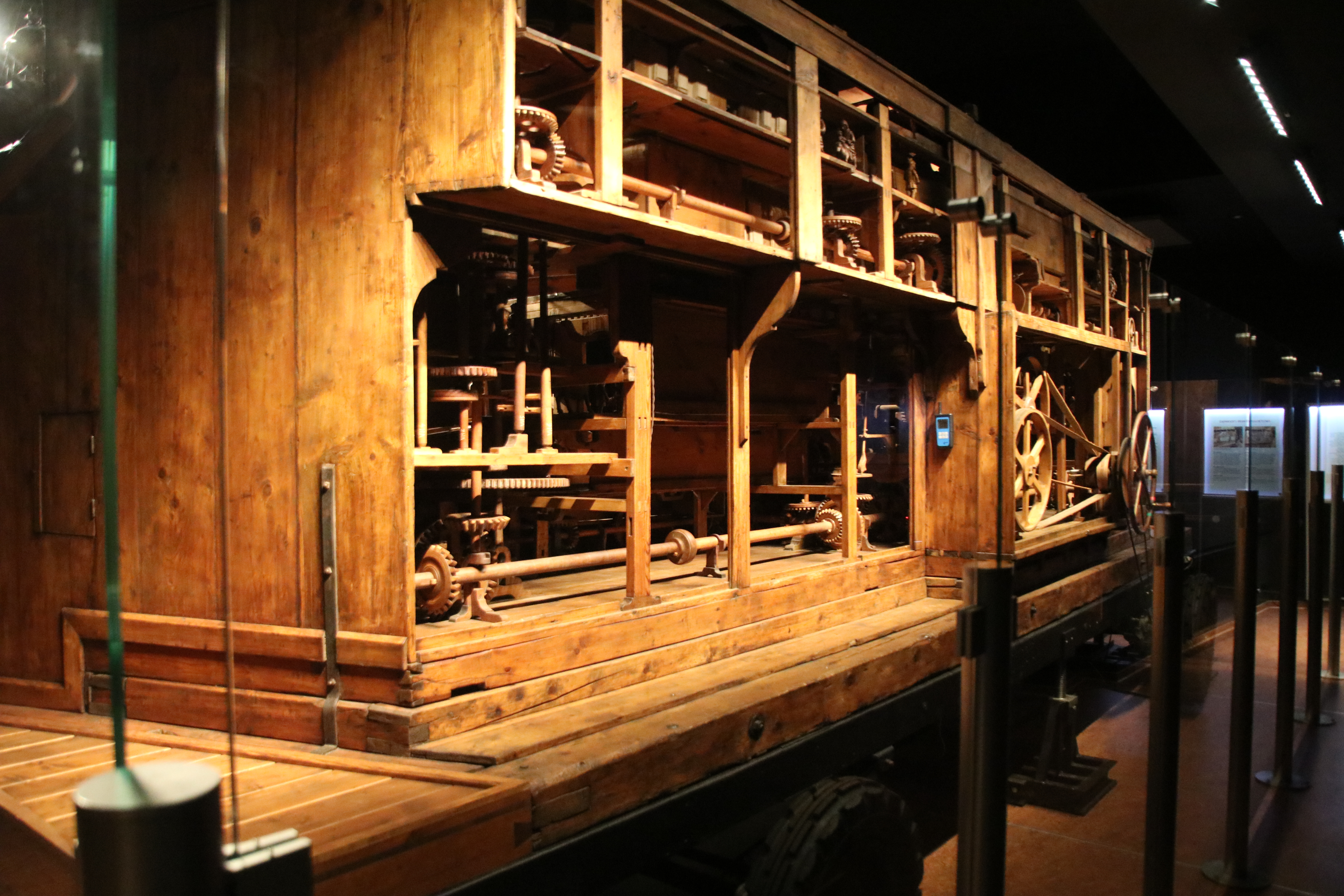
Mechanics in the back

== Figures and mechanism ==
It was built at the turn of the 19th and the 20th century, it took more than forty years to complete. It includes more than 2000 carved parts and figures, which are put in motion by a small electric motor. Altogether, 373 people are depicted. The landscape is divided into seven terraces filled with characters representing both biblical figures and inhabitants of Bohemia. They are carved from linden wood; three of the characters are reported to be made of pear wood. Figures are approximately 10–15 cm high and not polychromed, unlike the figures of most other nativity scenes; the carvers wanted to emphasize the unity of material.

Residents of Pitr's street who had been visiting Probošts to admire the nativity scene during its construction served as models for many of the characters depicted in the crib. Among them can be seen Probošt as a carpenter and Kapucián as wise old man. The crib also includes six flowering spreading linden trees, a usual part of Czech nativity scenes; according to Vaclík, these are among the most beautiful trees carved in the Czech Republic.

The crib was originally built on a right angle but at the turn of the 19th and 20th century it was rebuilt in a single plane. The whole nativity scene (including mechanical parts) is made of wood and is 6.9 metres (23 ft) long, 2.2 metres (7.2 ft) high and 1.9 metres (6.2 ft) deep. (Note: Sometimes other lengths are stated in some books (for example: 7 x 3.2 x 2.70 m in Vaclík's one) but these data do not reflect reality.)

== See also ==
- Krýza's crèche
- Weihnachtsberg
