= Třebechovice pod Orebem =

- Town
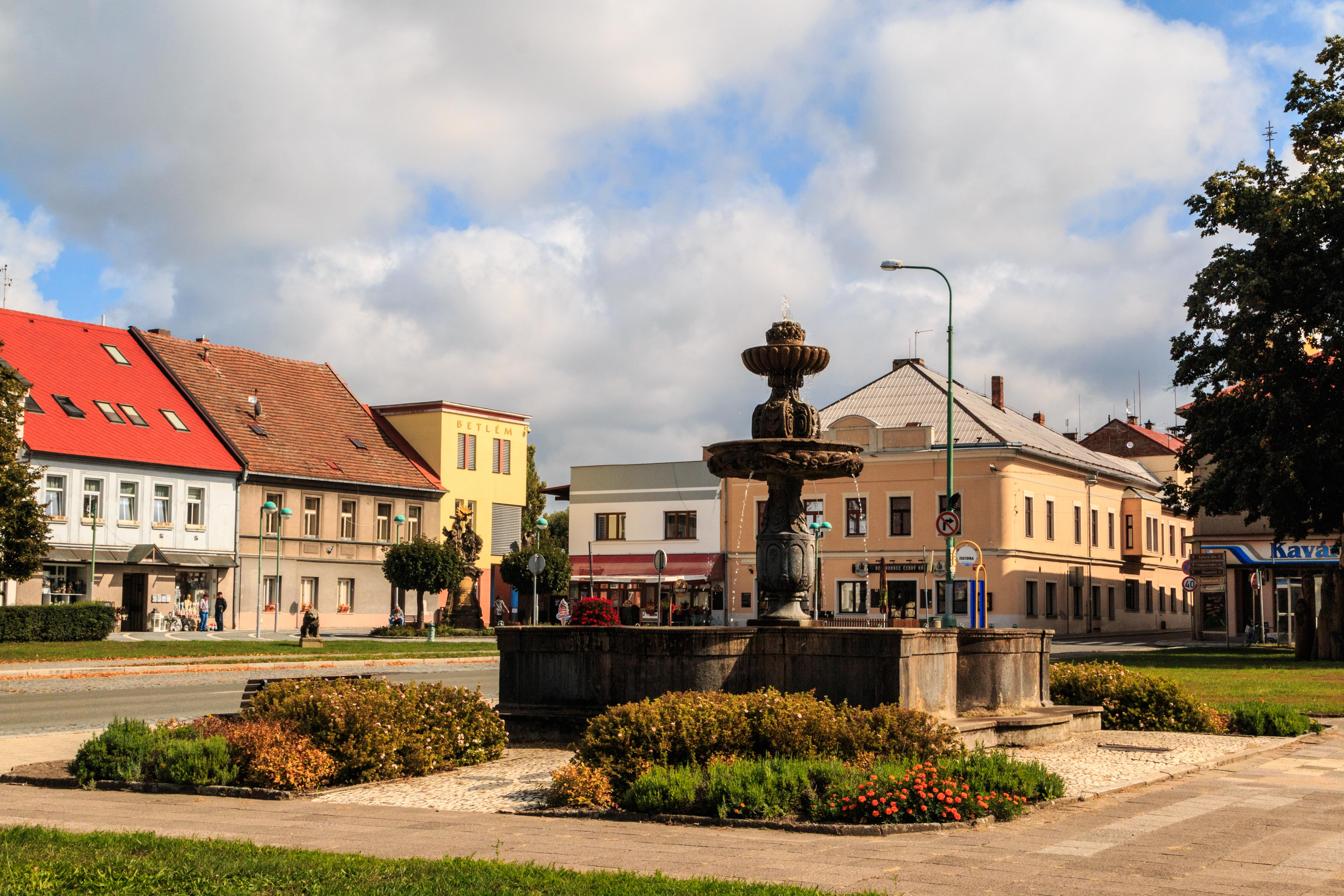
- The square Masarykovo náměstí

- Flag Coat of arms

- Location in the Czech Republic
- Coordinates: 50°12′4″N 15°59′32″E
- Country: Czech Republic
- Region: Hradec Králové
- District: Hradec Králové
- First mentioned: 1358

Government
  - Mayor: Roman Drašnar

Area
  - Total: 21.01 km^{2} (8.11 sq mi)
- Elevation: 243 m (797 ft)

Population (2026-01-01)
  - Total: 5,907
  - Density: 281.2/km^{2} (728.2/sq mi)
- Time zone: UTC+1 (CET)
  - Summer (DST): UTC+2 (CEST)
- Postal code: 503 46
- Website: www.trebechovice.cz

Třebechovice pod Orebem (Czech pronunciation: [ˈtr̝̊ɛbɛxovɪtsɛ ˈpot orɛbɛm]) is a town in Hradec Králové District in the Hradec Králové Region of the Czech Republic. It has about 5,900 inhabitants. The town is situated at the confluence of the Orlice and Dědina rivers. Třebechovice pod Orebem is known for the Museum of Nativity Scenes with more than 500 exhibits of nativity scenes.

== Administrative division ==
Třebechovice pod Orebem consists of five municipal parts (in brackets population according to the 2021 census):

- Třebechovice pod Orebem (4,687)
- Krňovice (96)
- Nepasice (350)
- Polánky nad Dědinou (276)
- Štěnkov (225)

== Etymology ==
The initial name of the settlement was Třebochovice. The name was derived from the personal name Třeboch, meaning "the village of Třeboch's people". From the mid-16th century, the name Třebechovice is used. In 1920, the town's name was changed to Třebechovice pod Orebem. It refers to the location of the town below the Oreb hill. The hill was named by the Hussites in 1419 after the biblical Mount Horeb.

== Geography ==
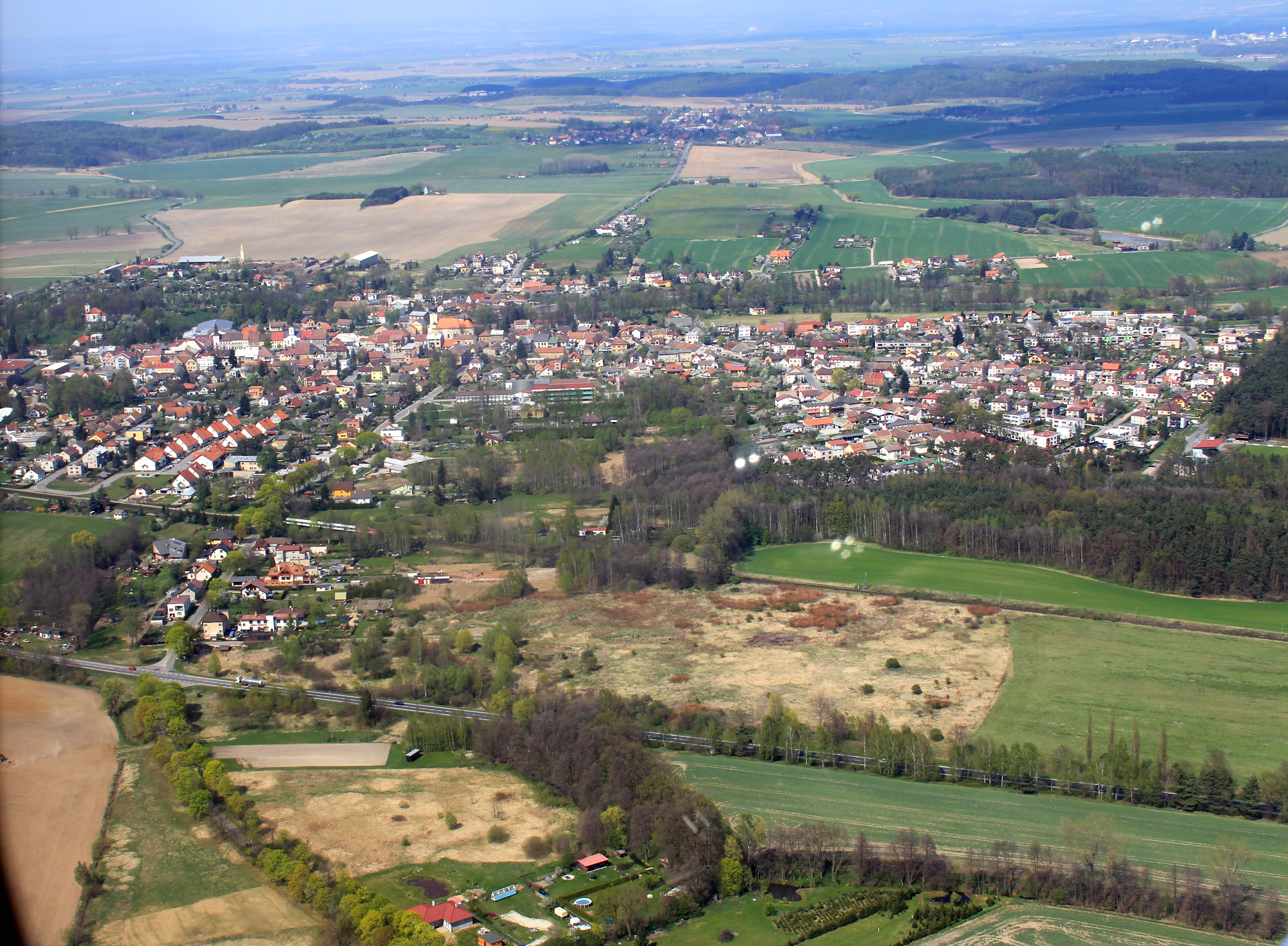
Aerial view

Třebechovice pod Orebem is located about 10 kilometres (6 mi) east of Hradec Králové. It lies in the Orlice Table. The town is situated beneath the hill Oreb, which is one of symbols of the town. The top of Oreb is located inside the built-up area and has an altitude of 256 metres (840 ft). However, the highest point of the municipal territory is at 287 m (942 ft) above sea level.

The Orlice River flows across the southern part of the territory. The Dědina River flows through the urban area until the confluence with the Orlice. The stream Cihelnický potok flows through the western part of the territory and also flows into the Orlice in the municipal territory.

== History ==
Třebechovice was founded in the 14th century. According to legend, the town was founded on the right bank of the Dědina River by Třeboch who brought his people there and gave the name to the town. In the 14th century, the town was owned by Hynek Hlaváč of Dubé and his descendants until 1450, when Přibík Kroměšín of Březovice became an owner. The town was owned by the Trčka of Lípa family in the 16th century and it economically developed.

In 1628, a large peasant uprising broke out in the region. Třebechovice was fined, which contributed to the impoverishment of the population. The decline of the town was deepened by four major fires in the 17th century. The economic and cultural situation was bad until the 19th century, when business began to develop again and cultural organisations were founded. In 1849, the serfdom was abolished and the town became independent.

== Demographics ==
Historical population

Year	Pop.	±%
1869	4,147	—
1880	4,484	+8.1%
1890	4,542	+1.3%
1900	4,632	+2.0%
1910	4,984	+7.6%

Year	Pop.	±%
1921	4,962	−0.4%
1930	5,496	+10.8%
1950	5,263	−4.2%
1961	5,524	+5.0%
1970	5,360	−3.0%

Year	Pop.	±%
1980	5,465	+2.0%
1991	5,253	−3.9%
2001	5,429	+3.4%
2011	5,718	+5.3%
2021	5,634	−1.5%

Source: Censuses

== Transport ==
Třebechovice pod Orebem is located on the railway line Hradec Králové–Letohrad.

== Sights ==
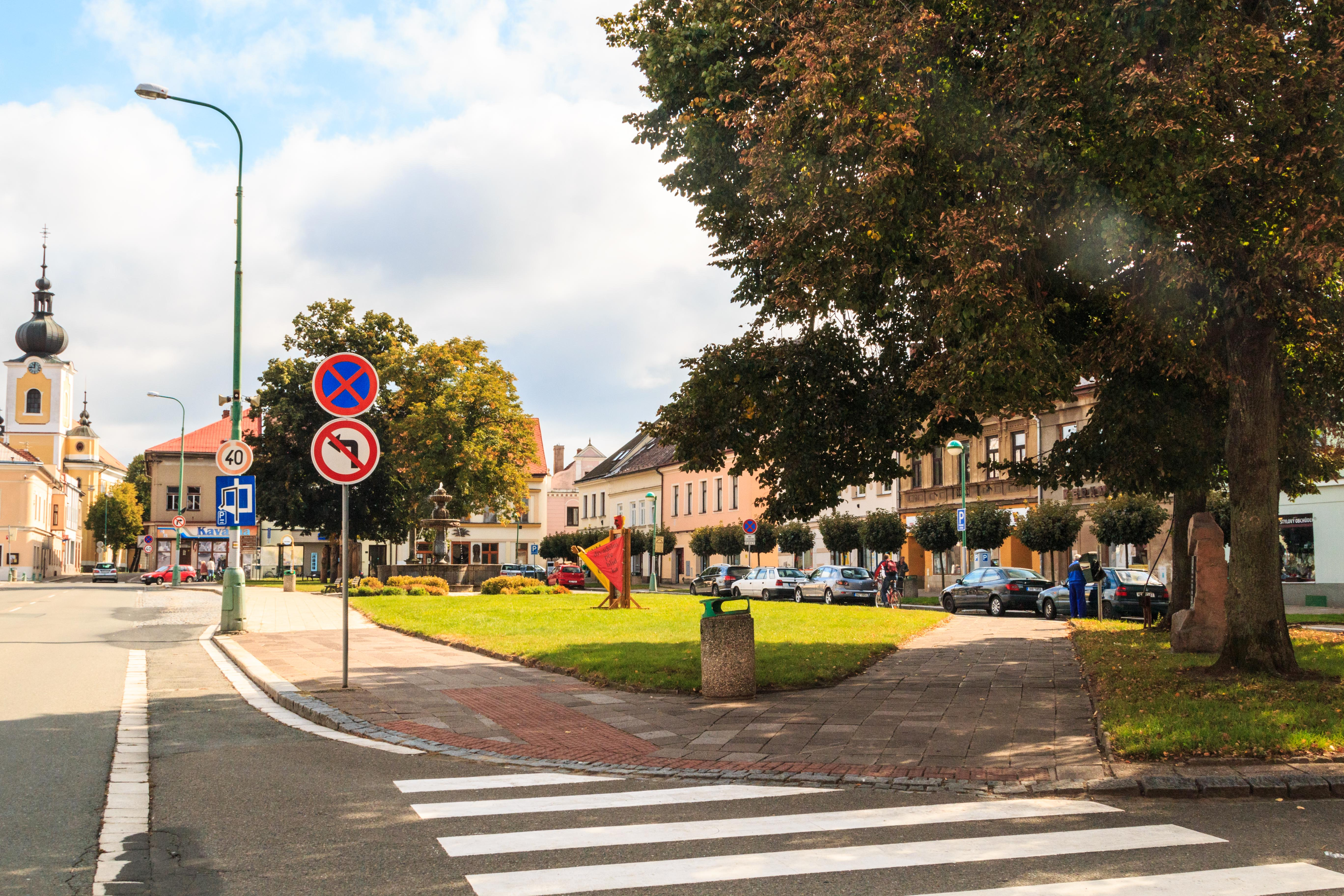
Masarykovo Square and the Church of Saint Andrew

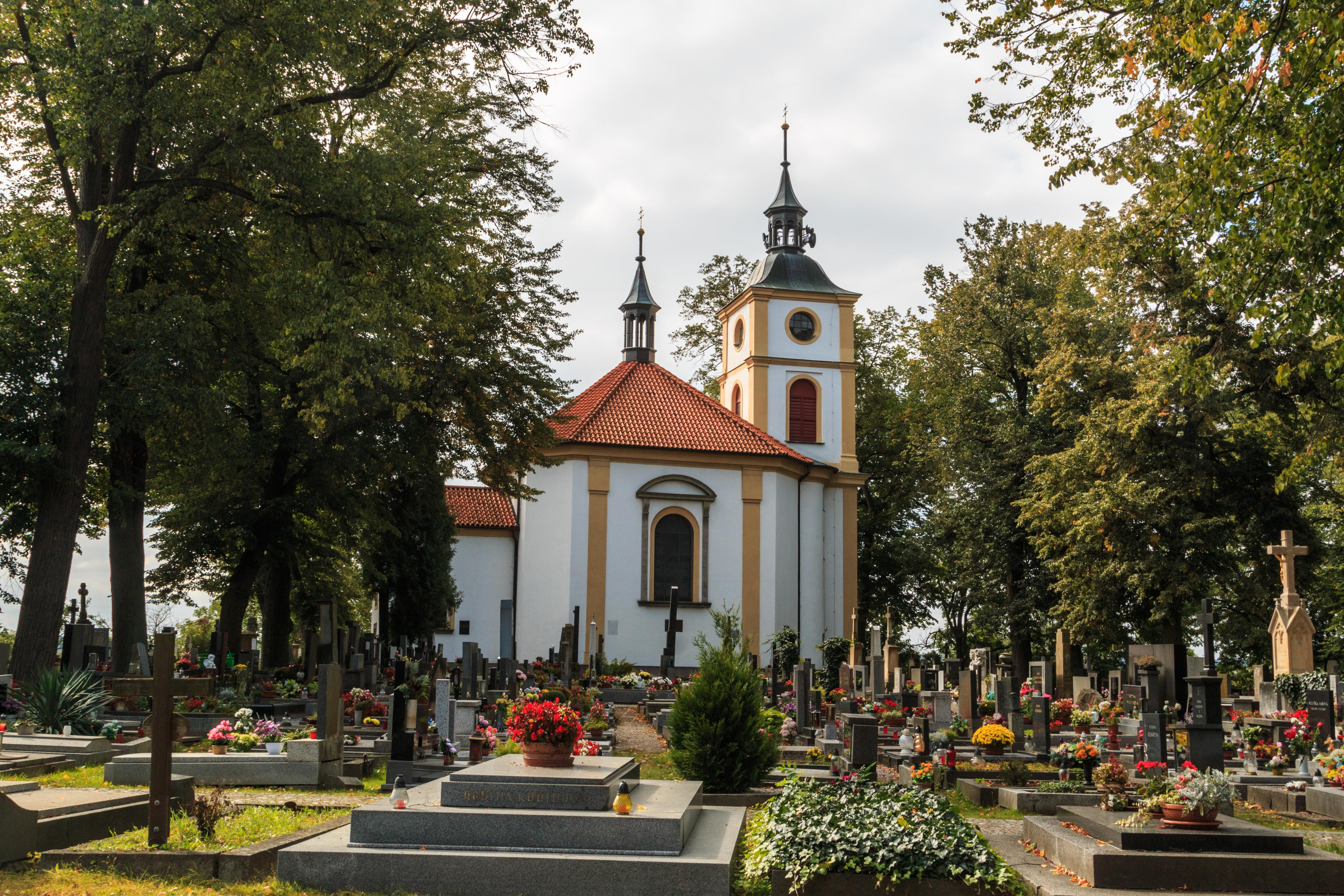
Church of Corpus Christi on the top of the Oreb hill

The Church of Saint Andrew was first mentioned in 1384. It was damaged by fires and renewed in 1572–1575. The tower was replaced in 1864.

The Evangelical church on the town square is a Neo-Romanesque building from 1877. It serves both religious and cultural purposes.

In 1528, a small wooden church was built on the Oreb hill at the command of Zdeněk Trčka of Lípa. This church fell into disrepair and was replaced by the new one in 1835. The new church is called Church of Corpus Christi.

=== Museum of Nativity Scenes ===
The Museum of Nativity Scenes was founded in 1925 by Vilém Koleš. There are more than 500 exhibits of nativity scenes. The museum is the only one of its kind in the country. The most valuable nativity scene is Probošt's mechanical Christmas crib created from wood, which includes more than 2,000 carved parts and figures.

The museum also manages the town's collections. The most valuable exhibit is the handwritten illuminated Literary Gradual from 1559.

== Notable people ==
- Jan Theobald Held (1770–1851), medical doctor, educator and composer
- Hana Voglová (1913–2005), translator
- Anka Bergman (1917–2013), Holocaust survivor
- Oldřich Rott (born 1951), footballer
- Jan Doležal (born 1996), decathlete

== Twin towns – sister cities ==
Třebechovice pod Orebem is twinned with:

- Bethlehem, Palestine

== Gallery ==
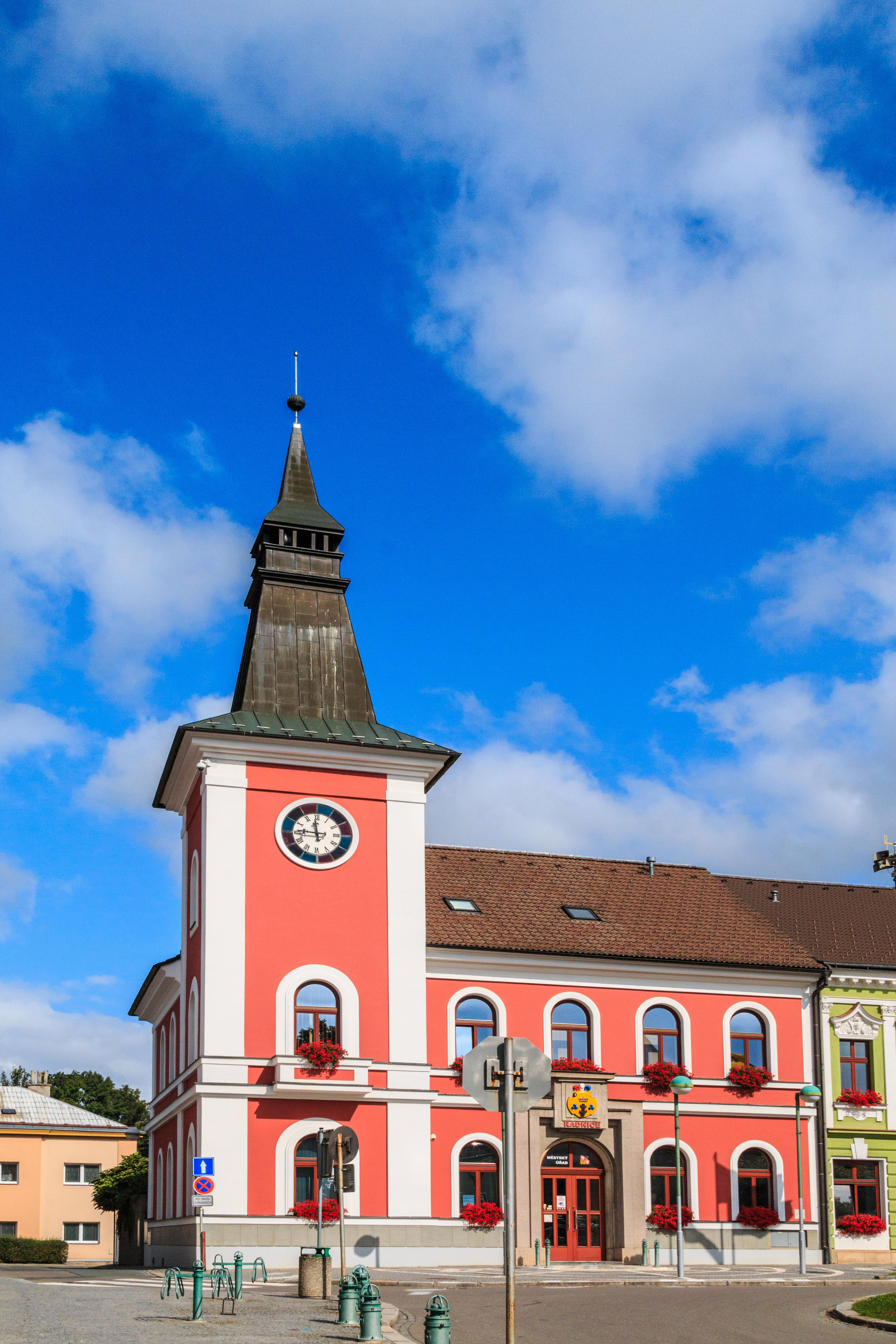
Town hall

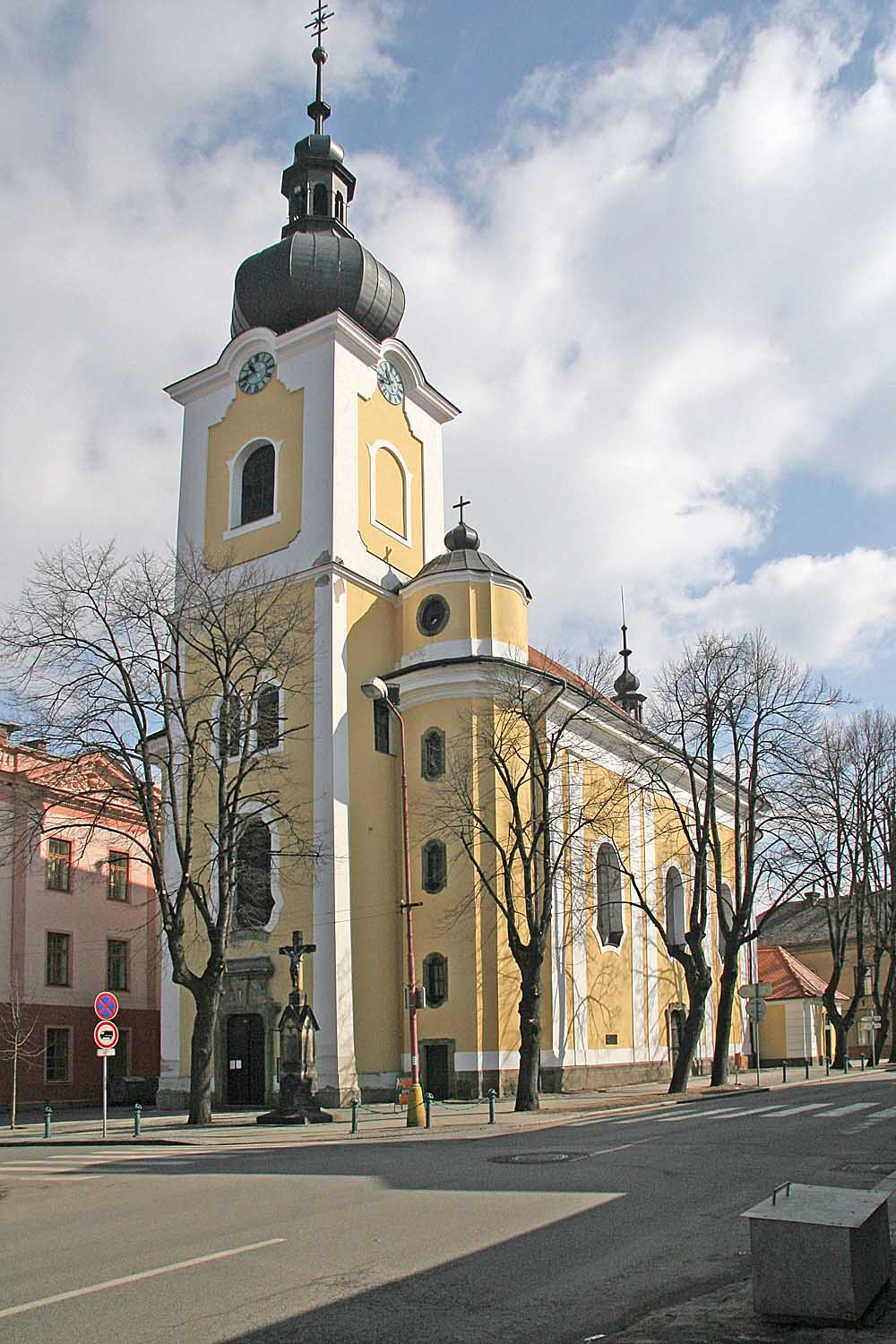
Church of Saint Andrew

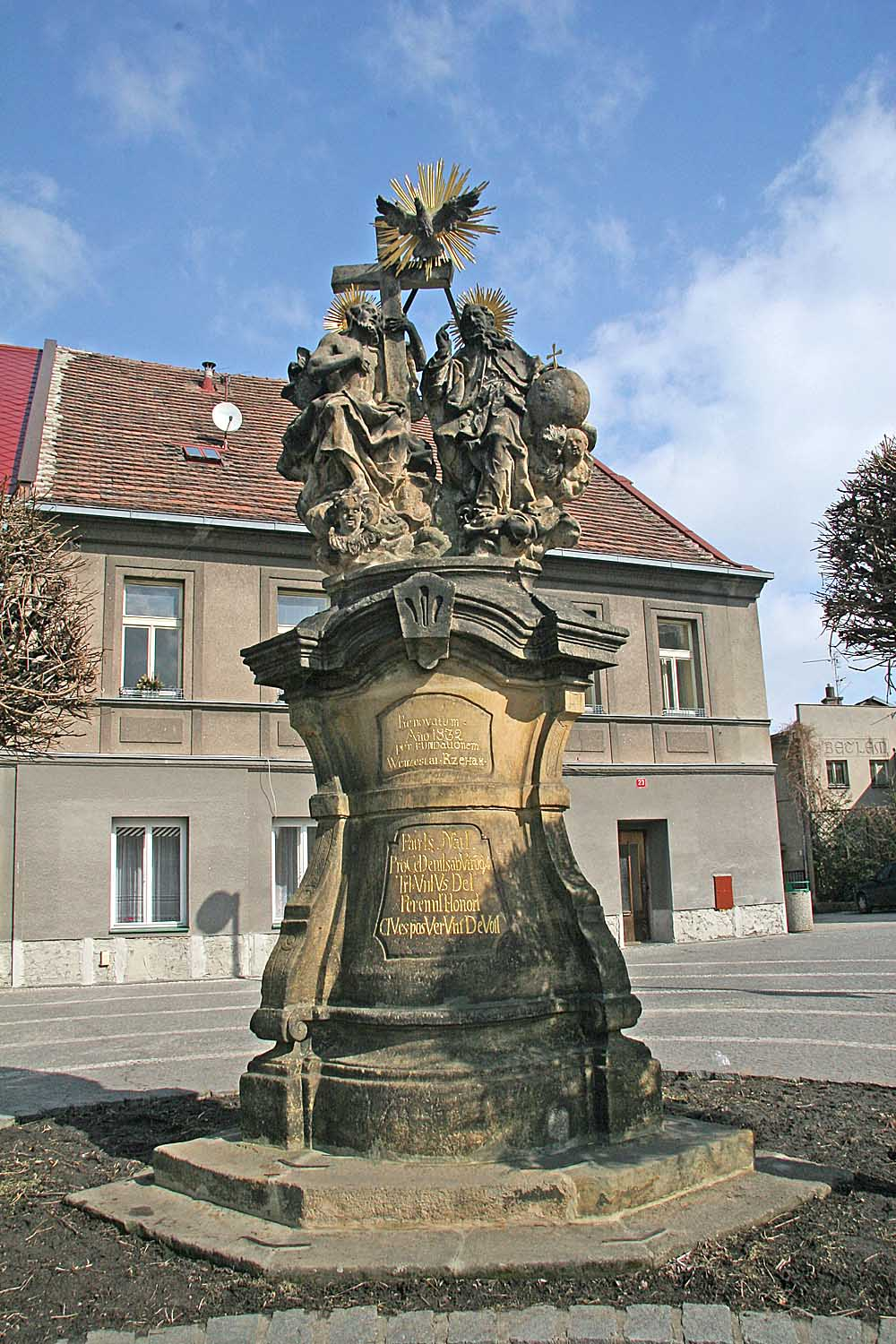
Statue of the Holy Trinity at the town square
