= Antonín Rezek =

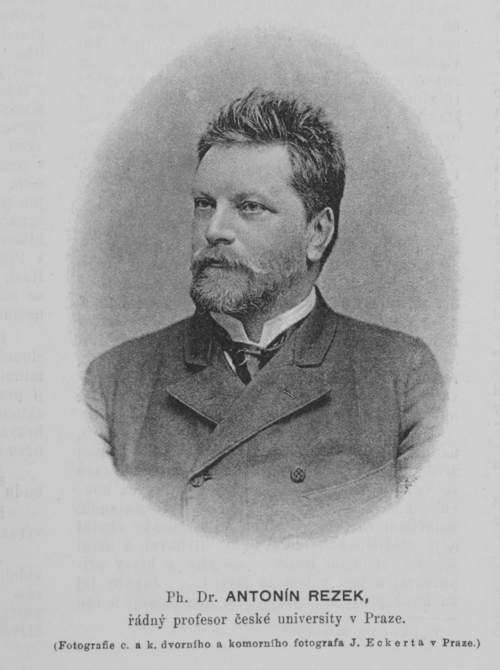
Antonín Rezek.

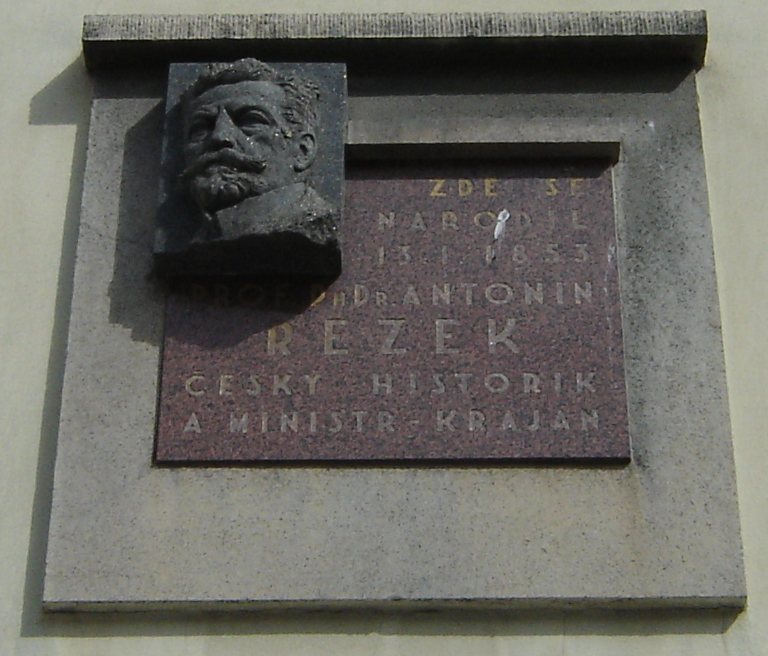
Memorial plate in Jindřichův Hradec

Antonín Rezek (13 January 1853 – 4 February 1909) was Czech political historian, specialized in political and religious history of the 16th–18th centuries.

== Life ==
Rezek was born in Jindřichův Hradec on 13 January 1853. Son of a renowned watchmaker, Rezek graduated 1875 at Charles University in Prague, where he became professor of general history in 1883. In the years 1900–1903 he was minister of the Imperial Austrian government in Vienna. He published numerous popular articles and works, edited many documents from the archives and reedited several Czech chronicles from the 17th century. His works excel in perfect documentation and detailed knowledge of the matter.

Rezek died in Prague on 4 February 1909.

== Works ==
- Dějiny Čech a Moravy nové doby I., II. (1893)
- Dějiny vlády Ferdinanda I. v Čechách

== Sources ==
- JIROUŠEK, Bohumil. Antonín Rezek. České Budějovice: University of South Bohemia in České Budějovice 2002. ISBN 80-7040-206-7. (in Czech)
