= Rosička (Jindřichův Hradec District) =

- Municipality
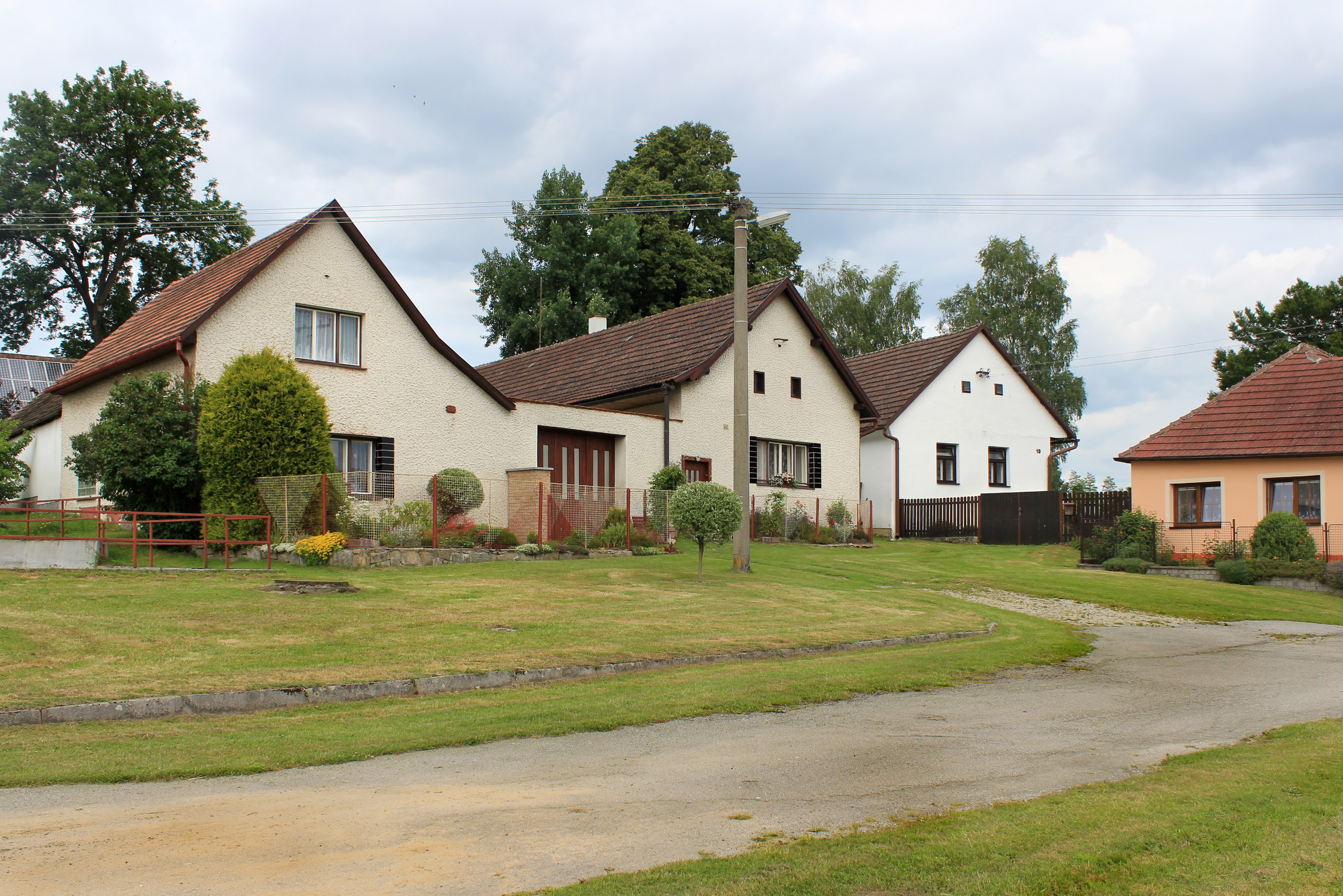
- Centre of Rosička

- Location in the Czech Republic
- Coordinates: 49°16′47″N 14°57′14″E
- Country: Czech Republic
- Region: South Bohemian
- District: Jindřichův Hradec
- First mentioned: 1603

Area
  - Total: 3.95 km^{2} (1.53 sq mi)
- Elevation: 427 m (1,401 ft)

Population (2026-01-01)
  - Total: 65
  - Density: 16/km^{2} (43/sq mi)
- Time zone: UTC+1 (CET)
  - Summer (DST): UTC+2 (CEST)
- Postal code: 378 21
- Website: www.obecrosicka.cz

Rosička is a municipality and village in Jindřichův Hradec District in the South Bohemian Region of the Czech Republic. It has about 70 inhabitants.

Rosička lies approximately 15 kilometres (9 mi) north of Jindřichův Hradec, 50 km (31 mi) north-east of České Budějovice, and 98 km (61 mi) south-east of Prague.

== Demographics ==
Historical population
Year	Pop.	±%
1869	246	—
1880	246	+0.0%
1890	233	−5.3%
1900	255	+9.4%
1910	274	+7.5%
1921	244	−10.9%
1930	222	−9.0%
1950	163	−26.6%
1961	158	−3.1%
1970	134	−15.2%
1980	88	−34.3%
1991	68	−22.7%
2001	62	−8.8%
2011	51	−17.7%
2021	61	+19.6%
Source: Censuses
