= Krýza's crèche =

Nativity scene by Tomáš Krýza

Coordinates: 49°8′37.14″N 15°0′1.34″E

Krýza's crèche (Czech: Krýzovy jesličky) is a nativity scene (crèche) created by Tomáš Krýza. It is a large mechanical construction, since 1998 mentioned in Guinness Book of World Records as the largest mechanical nativity scene in the world.

== Origin and description ==
Stocking-weaver Tomáš Krýza (1838–1918) was a burgher from Jindřichův Hradec (a town in today's South Bohemian Region of the Czech Republic). He had worked on the crèche for over sixty years. The scene covers around 60 m^{2} (length 17 m, size and height 2 m). It contains 1,389 figures of humans and animals, of which 133 are moveable. The material used was wood, flour, sawdust, gypsum and fish glue. The mechanical parts were originally powered manually. Now a single electric motor is used.

The oldest part of the nativity scene depicts the birth of Christ. The Bible's themes and everyday life scenes in 19th century Bohemia inspired the rest.

== Presentation ==
The crèche is now exhibited in the Jindřichův Hradec Museum. The region has a tradition of nativity scenes; the first written record comes from 1579. In 1936 the museum obtained two other large nativity scenes created by Emanuela and Bohdan Steinocher. These are placed next to the Krýza's crèche.

== Gallery ==
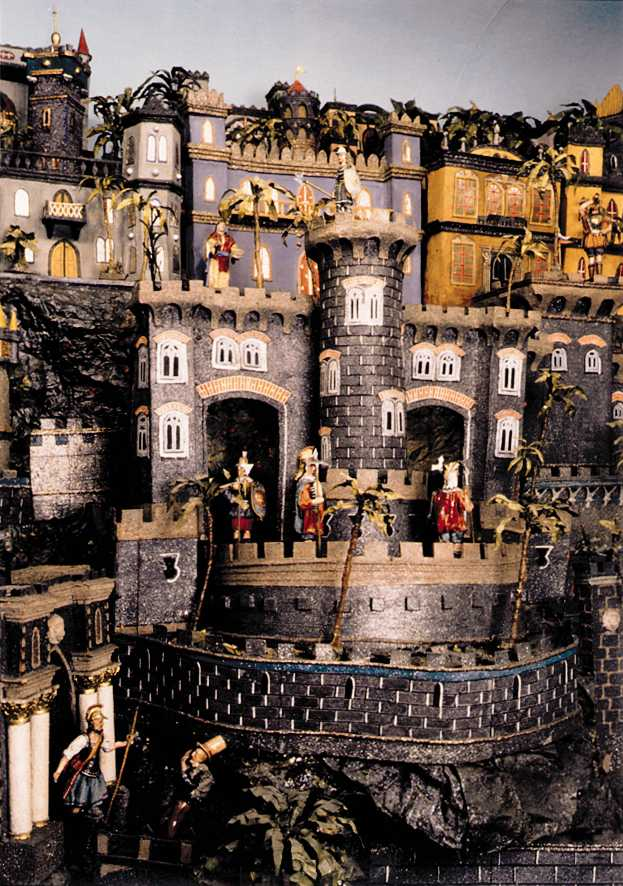
Castle

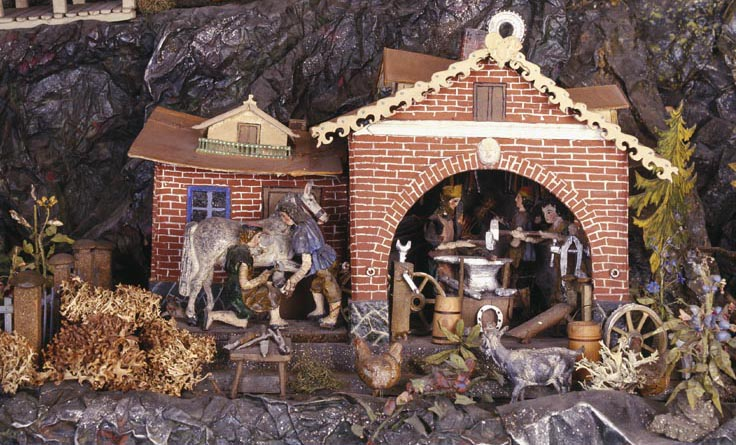
Blacksmiths

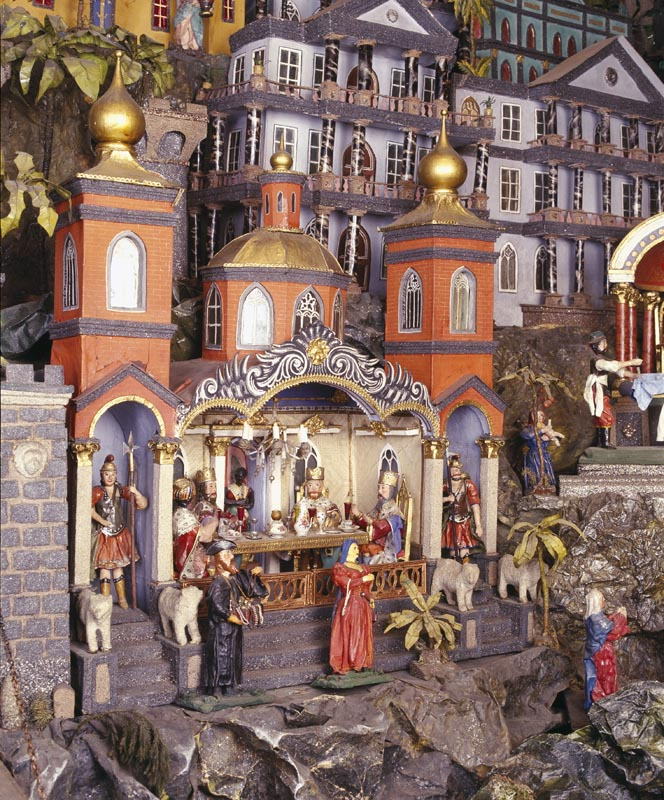
Palace

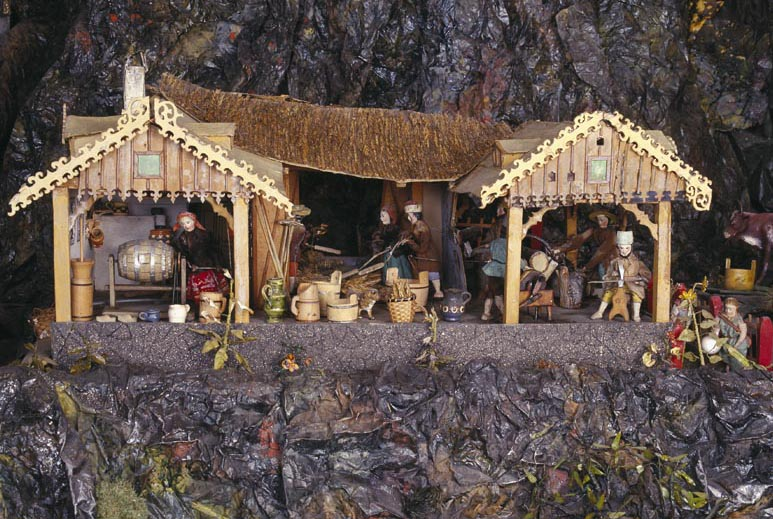
Farm

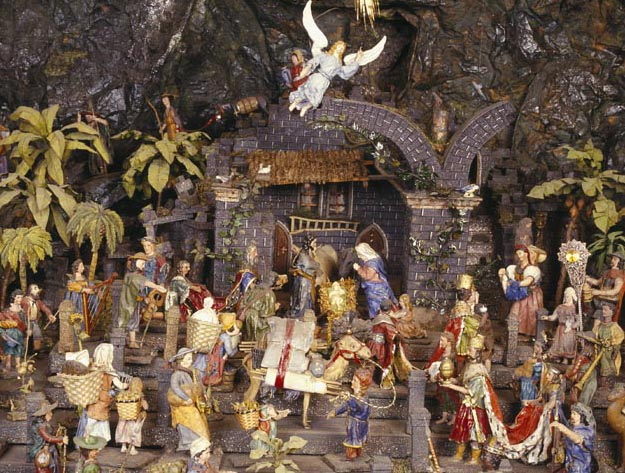
Centre

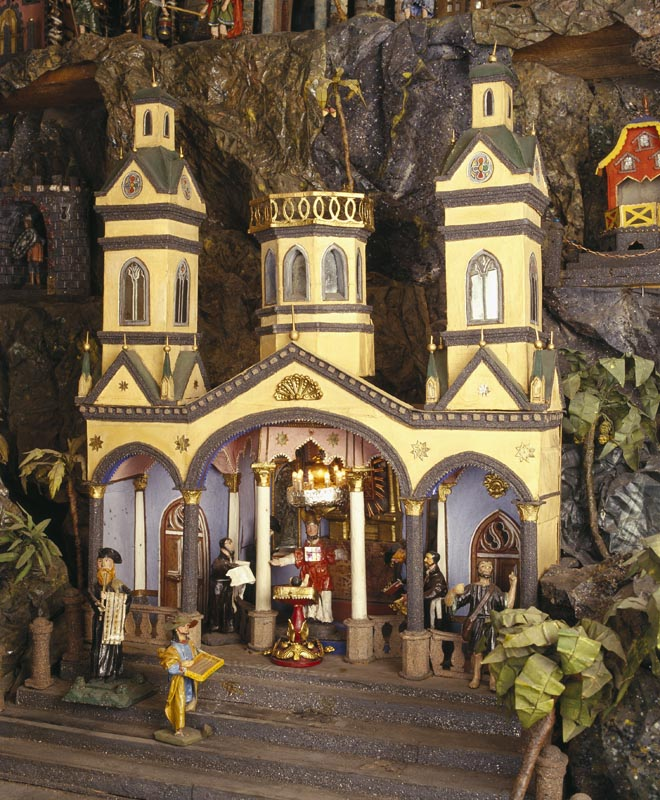
Temple

== See also ==
- Probošt's mechanical Christmas crib
