= Hadravova Rosička =

- Municipality
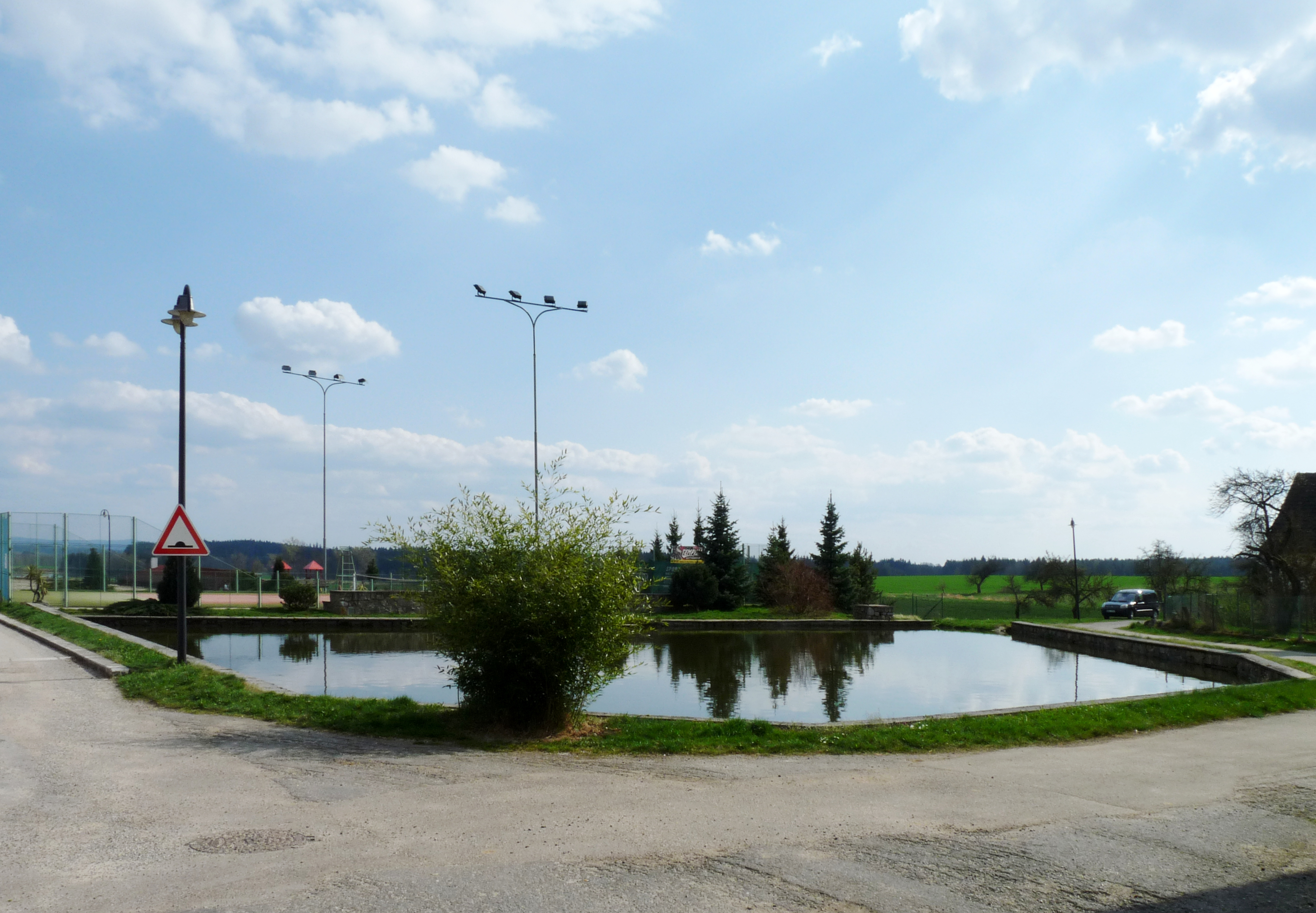
- Southern part of Hadravova Rosička

- Location in the Czech Republic
- Coordinates: 49°15′3″N 15°2′51″E
- Country: Czech Republic
- Region: South Bohemian
- District: Jindřichův Hradec
- First mentioned: 1549

Area
  - Total: 2.70 km^{2} (1.04 sq mi)
- Elevation: 537 m (1,762 ft)

Population (2026-01-01)
  - Total: 53
  - Density: 20/km^{2} (51/sq mi)
- Time zone: UTC+1 (CET)
  - Summer (DST): UTC+2 (CEST)
- Postal code: 378 42
- Website: www.hadravovarosicka.cz

Hadravova Rosička is a municipality and village in Jindřichův Hradec District in the South Bohemian Region of the Czech Republic. It has about 50 inhabitants.

== Demographics ==
Historical population
Year	Pop.	±%
1869	142	—
1880	141	−0.7%
1890	147	+4.3%
1900	139	−5.4%
1910	142	+2.2%
1921	130	−8.5%
1930	108	−16.9%
1950	91	−15.7%
1961	90	−1.1%
1970	86	−4.4%
1980	69	−19.8%
1991	54	−21.7%
2001	62	+14.8%
2011	51	−17.7%
2021	48	−5.9%
Source: Censuses
