= Jan Theobald Held =

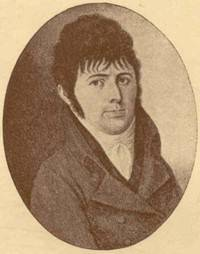
- Born: December 11, 1770; Třebechovice pod Orebem, Kingdom of Bohemia
- Died: June 20, 1851 (aged 80); Prague
- Other names: Johann Theobald Held; Jan František Held; Jan Orebský
- Occupations: physician, composer

Jan Theobald Held (December 11, 1770 – June 20, 1851), also known as Johann Theobald Held, was a Bohemian medical doctor, educator, musician, and composer. He was noted for his theories on psychosis, and the links between psychology and environmental conditions. He served as the dean of Charles University, Prague, and was depicted in the novel F. L. Věk by Alois Jirásek.

== Early life and education ==
Jan was born in Třebechovice pod Orebem on December 11, 1770. His early education took place in the town of his birth, where he received training in singing and in instrumental performance. His father died in 1780, and he was sponsored by townspeople to join a choir in Prague, and also to attend secondary school, where he earned a scholarship that allowed him to complete his education. In the choir he had been a boy soprano, but at age 19 his voice no longer allowed this, so he turned to violin and viola performance. His teachers encouraged him to study medical science, and he received his M.D. degree in Prague in 1797. Before his father died, he had instructed Jan to pursue his fortune in a foreign country, so Held intended to follow his older brother to Poland. However, he was discouraged from doing so by the Partition of Poland.

== Medical career ==
He began practicing medicine at the Brothers of Charity hospital in 1799, at the invitation of his friend Daniel O'Hehir. After O'Hehir died in 1799 aged 27, Held was chosen as his successor. In 1813 he became head of the mental asylum there, working to reform patient treatment resulting in more humane care and conditions, and spending much of his own salary on improving the lives of individual patients and maintaining the hospital. He became head physician in 1822. The next year he became the chief examiner for medical exams in Prague. He served at Brothers of Charity until 1824.

Held concluded that various forms of psychosis were of materialistic origin, and that thinking itself was a chemical process. He was an early proponent of the theory that mental health is affected by environmental conditions. For instance, in 1811 he demonstrated the correlation between state bankruptcy and the resulting decline in societal conditions, and an increase in psychological issues. He disproved a popular theory that mental disorders were increased by the appearance of a comet.

== Later career ==
He was elected dean of Charles University, Prague, on five occasions. He became an imperial councillor in 1841. In 1847 the physicians of Prague recognized his 50 years of service as a physician. He died in Prague on June 20, 1851.

== Writings ==
Due to the time he devoted to patient care and the administration of the hospital, Held published fewer works than most academics of his educational position. His publications include:

- Das Heimatsfest zu Hohenbruck, in Böhmen am 16.–18. Juli 1816, Prague 1818
- Ein Wort bei der Immatriculation der an der Prager Carl-Ferdinands-Universität sich den sämmtlichen Studien der Heilkunde widmenden Zöglinge, Vienna 1820
- Kurze Geschichte der Heilanstalt der Barmherzigen Brüder in Prag. Nebst Rückblicken auf Entstehung, Verbreitung und Schicksale dieses Ordens überhaupt, Prague 1823 (Digitized)
- Tentamen historicum illustrandis rebus anno MCCCCIX in Universitate pragena gestis, Prague 1827
- Blick auf Carlsbad. Ein Sendschreiben an den Herrn Johann Ritter de Carro, Prague 1835 (Digitized)
- Ein Wort an die Zöglinge der vom Vereine für Kirchenmusik begründeten Orgelschule, Prague 1837
- Zweiter Blick auf Carlsbad. Ein Sendschreiben u. s. w., Prague 1838

== Musical contributions ==
In addition to the violin, he was an accomplished player of the guitar. He published a set of folk songs under the pseudonym Jan Orebský.

== Legacy ==
Held's reputation among Czech people was improved by a romanticized depiction in the novel F. L. Věk by Alois Jirásek.
