= Jindřichův Hradec =

Town in the Czech Republic

- Town
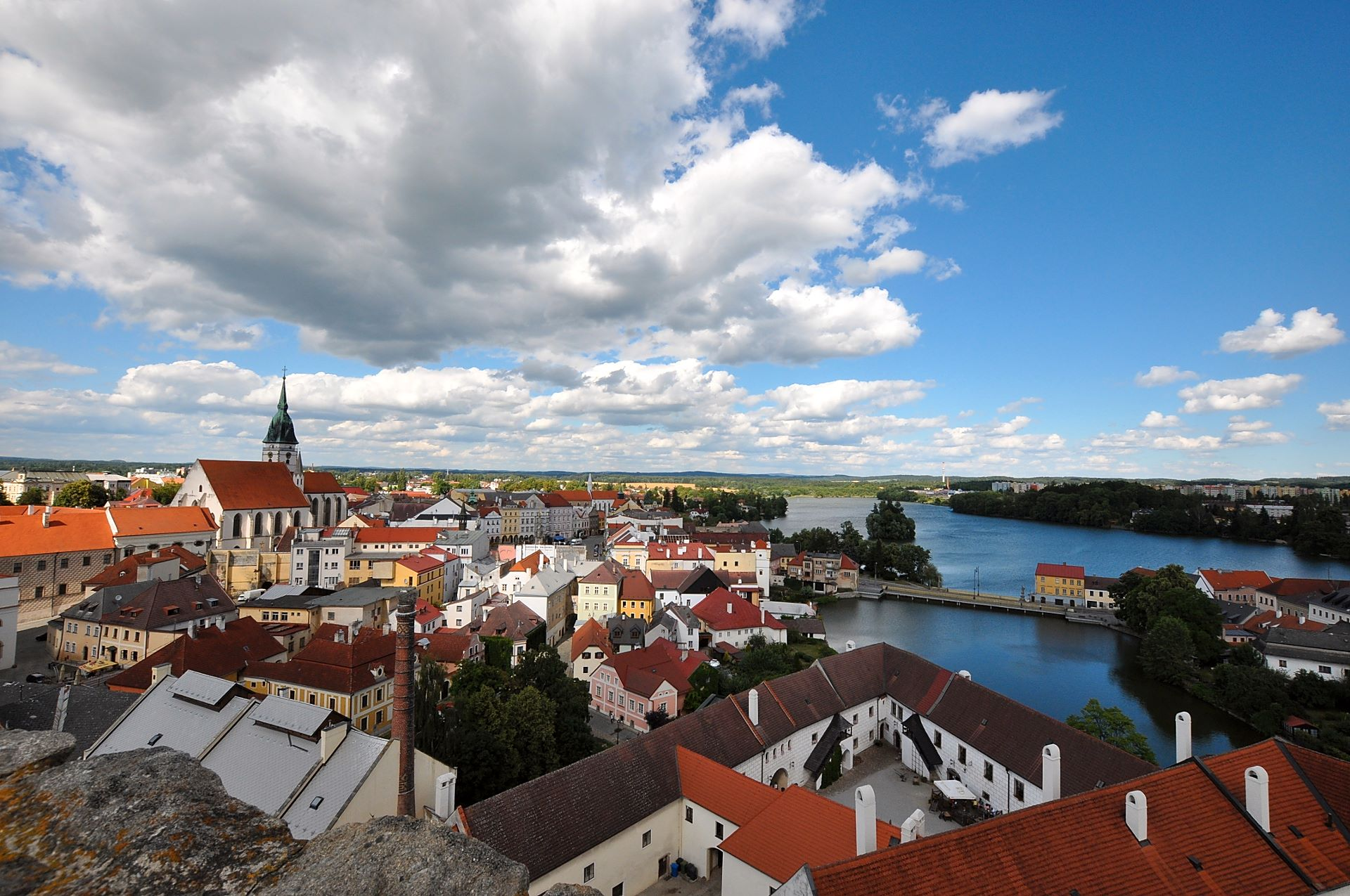
- Centre of Jindřichův Hradec

- Flag Coat of arms

- Location in the Czech Republic
- Coordinates: 49°8′39″N 15°0′11″E
- Country: Czech Republic
- Region: South Bohemian
- District: Jindřichův Hradec
- First mentioned: 1220

Government
  - Mayor: Michal Kozár

Area
  - Total: 74.29 km^{2} (28.68 sq mi)
- Elevation: 475 m (1,558 ft)

Population (2026-01-01)
  - Total: 20,369
  - Density: 274.2/km^{2} (710.1/sq mi)
- Time zone: UTC+1 (CET)
  - Summer (DST): UTC+2 (CEST)
- Postal code: 377 01
- Website: www.jh.cz

Jindřichův Hradec (Czech pronunciation: [ˈjɪndr̝ɪxuːf ˈɦradɛts]; German: Neuhaus) is a town in the South Bohemian Region of the Czech Republic. It has about 20,000 inhabitants. The town is located on the Nežárka River in the Křemešník Highlands, on the shore of Vajgar pond.

The historic town centre is well preserved and is protected as an urban monument reservation. The most important monument is the Jindřichův Hradec Castle, protected as a national cultural monument.

== Administrative division ==
Jindřichův Hradec consists of 14 municipal parts (in brackets population according to the 2021 census):

- Jindřichův Hradec I (590)
- Jindřichův Hradec II (5,579)
- Jindřichův Hradec III (6,943)
- Jindřichův Hradec IV (1,405)
- Jindřichův Hradec V (2,368)
- Buk (271)
- Děbolín (245)
- Dolní Radouň (262)
- Dolní Skrýchov (252)
- Horní Žďár (250)
- Matná (55)
- Otín (1,340)
- Políkno (195)
- Radouňka (682)

== Etymology ==
The Czech word hradec is a diminutive of hrad, i.e. 'castle'. Jindřichův Hradec ("Jindřich's small castle") was named after its founder, nobleman Jindřich I Vítkovec.

== Geography ==
Jindřichův Hradec is located about 42 kilometres (26 mi) northeast of České Budějovice. It lies in the Křemešník Highlands. The highest point is the hill Rýdův kopec at 553 m (1,814 ft) above sea level.

The town is situated at the confluence of the Nežárka River and the stream Hamerský potok, and on the shore of the fishpond Vajgar (built on the Hamerský potok), which is one of the symbols of the town. It is a 49 ha (120 acres) large pond established in 1399. There is a significant amount of other fishponds in the municipal territory.

=== Climate ===
Climate data for Jindřichův Hradec, 1991–2020 normals, extremes 1961–present
| Month | Jan | Feb | Mar | Apr | May | Jun | Jul | Aug | Sep | Oct | Nov | Dec | Year |
|---|---|---|---|---|---|---|---|---|---|---|---|---|---|
| Record high °C (°F) | 17.4 (63.3) | 19.6 (67.3) | 24.3 (75.7) | 28.8 (83.8) | 31.6 (88.9) | 34.5 (94.1) | 37.5 (99.5) | 36.5 (97.7) | 34.1 (93.4) | 27.4 (81.3) | 20.1 (68.2) | 18.1 (64.6) | 37.5 (99.5) |
| Mean daily maximum °C (°F) | 1.4 (34.5) | 3.4 (38.1) | 8.0 (46.4) | 14.1 (57.4) | 18.6 (65.5) | 22.2 (72.0) | 24.3 (75.7) | 24.4 (75.9) | 18.7 (65.7) | 12.7 (54.9) | 6.2 (43.2) | 2.0 (35.6) | 13.0 (55.4) |
| Daily mean °C (°F) | −1.7 (28.9) | −0.6 (30.9) | 3.2 (37.8) | 8.3 (46.9) | 12.8 (55.0) | 16.2 (61.2) | 18.1 (64.6) | 17.8 (64.0) | 13.0 (55.4) | 8.0 (46.4) | 3.1 (37.6) | −0.7 (30.7) | 8.1 (46.6) |
| Mean daily minimum °C (°F) | −4.7 (23.5) | −4.3 (24.3) | −0.9 (30.4) | 3.0 (37.4) | 7.3 (45.1) | 10.6 (51.1) | 12.2 (54.0) | 12.2 (54.0) | 8.3 (46.9) | 4.3 (39.7) | 0.5 (32.9) | −3.4 (25.9) | 3.8 (38.8) |
| Record low °C (°F) | −26.6 (−15.9) | −27.0 (−16.6) | −24.7 (−12.5) | −8.3 (17.1) | −3.7 (25.3) | −1.6 (29.1) | 2.7 (36.9) | 0.6 (33.1) | −2.9 (26.8) | −9.0 (15.8) | −16.6 (2.1) | −25.5 (−13.9) | −27.0 (−16.6) |
| Average precipitation mm (inches) | 41.4 (1.63) | 30.8 (1.21) | 44.6 (1.76) | 36.4 (1.43) | 71.7 (2.82) | 79.8 (3.14) | 88.1 (3.47) | 83.9 (3.30) | 58.4 (2.30) | 45.5 (1.79) | 38.5 (1.52) | 35.8 (1.41) | 654.9 (25.78) |
| Average snowfall cm (inches) | 25.2 (9.9) | 18.0 (7.1) | 10.3 (4.1) | 1.2 (0.5) | 0.0 (0.0) | 0.0 (0.0) | 0.0 (0.0) | 0.0 (0.0) | 0.0 (0.0) | 0.3 (0.1) | 6.7 (2.6) | 17.6 (6.9) | 79.2 (31.2) |
| Average relative humidity (%) | 86.8 | 81.9 | 77.0 | 70.7 | 72.6 | 73.2 | 71.8 | 72.5 | 79.9 | 84.7 | 89.6 | 88.9 | 79.1 |
| Mean monthly sunshine hours | 49.0 | 81.4 | 128.1 | 188.5 | 218.2 | 219.8 | 236.6 | 235.7 | 165.4 | 111.1 | 50.4 | 39.7 | 1,723.8 |
Source: Czech Hydrometeorological Institute

== History ==
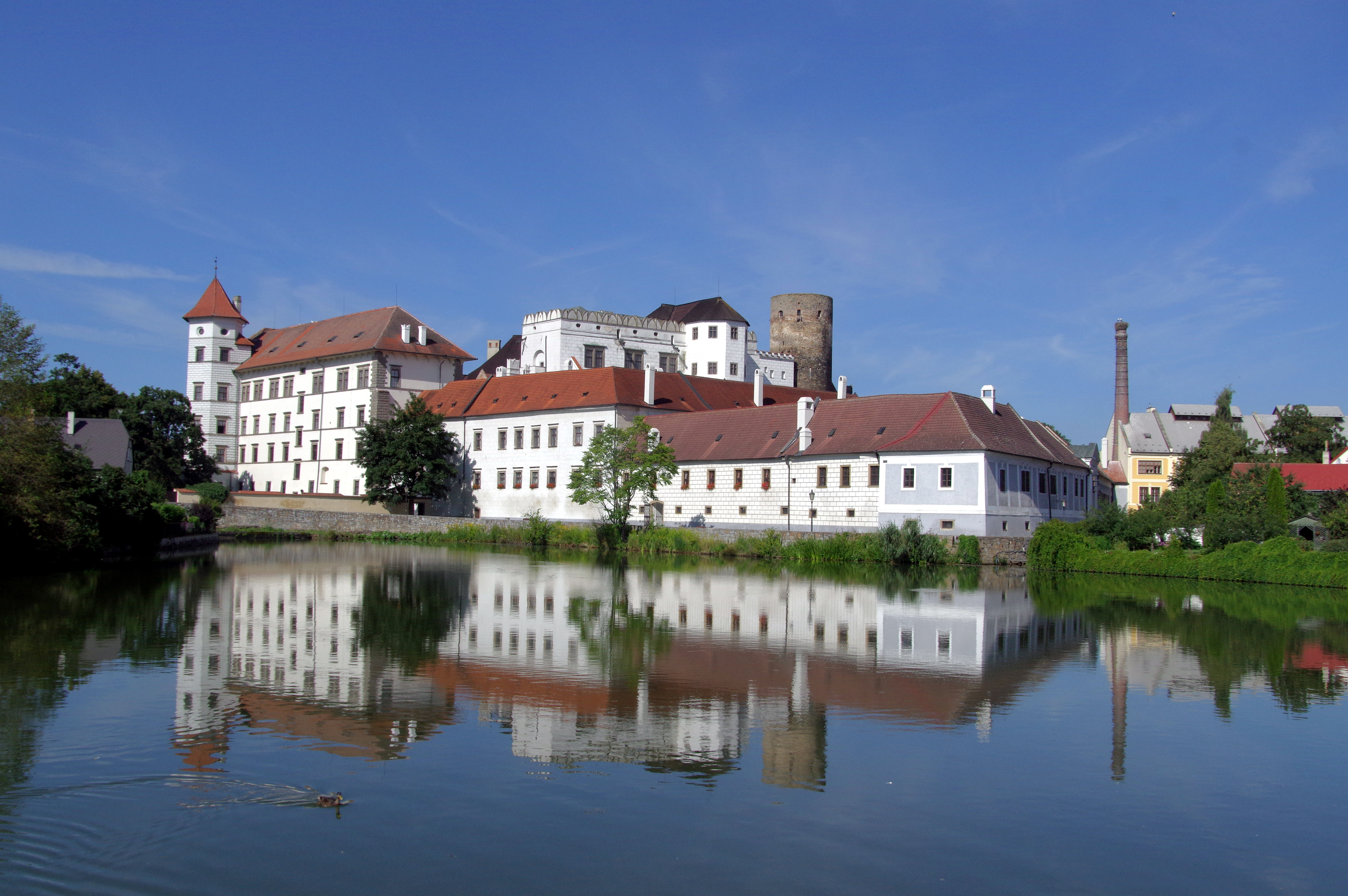
Jindřichův Hradec Castle

The predecessor of today's town was a Slavic gord. The first written mention of Hradec is from 1220, when a Gothic castle was built on the site of the former gord by the owner of the estate, Jindřich I Vítkovec from the Vítkovci family (founder of the line of the Lords of Hradec). In the mid-13th century, a settlement was founded by the castle and named after the founder of the castle. The current name Jindřichův Hradec is documented first in 1410.

In the late 16th century, when Jindřichův Hradec was owned by the last members of the Hradec family, the town has reached the peak of its development. The houses and the castle were rebuilt from Gothic into the Renaissance style, and the town spread beyond the town walls. After the Thirty Years' War, in 1654, Jindřichův Hradec was the second largest town in the Kingdom of Bohemia with 405 houses. Soon after, however, it lost its political importance, and at the end of the 17th century, economic importance also declined.

In 1773 and 1801 respectively, the town was damaged by large fires and many houses have undergone building modifications. Part of the town walls was demolished and a new large park was established on the border between Old Town and New Town. In 1887, the town was connected by railway with Veselí nad Lužnicí and Jihlava.

== Demographics ==
Historical population

| Year | Pop. | ±% |
|---|---|---|
| 1869 | 12,294 | — |
| 1880 | 12,314 | +0.2% |
| 1890 | 12,032 | −2.3% |
| 1900 | 12,836 | +6.7% |
| 1910 | 13,602 | +6.0% |

| Year | Pop. | ±% |
|---|---|---|
| 1921 | 12,788 | −6.0% |
| 1930 | 13,591 | +6.3% |
| 1950 | 12,080 | −11.1% |
| 1961 | 12,621 | +4.5% |
| 1970 | 14,675 | +16.3% |

| Year | Pop. | ±% |
|---|---|---|
| 1980 | 19,923 | +35.8% |
| 1991 | 21,822 | +9.5% |
| 2001 | 22,695 | +4.0% |
| 2011 | 21,574 | −4.9% |
| 2021 | 20,437 | −5.3% |

Source: Censuses

== Economy ==
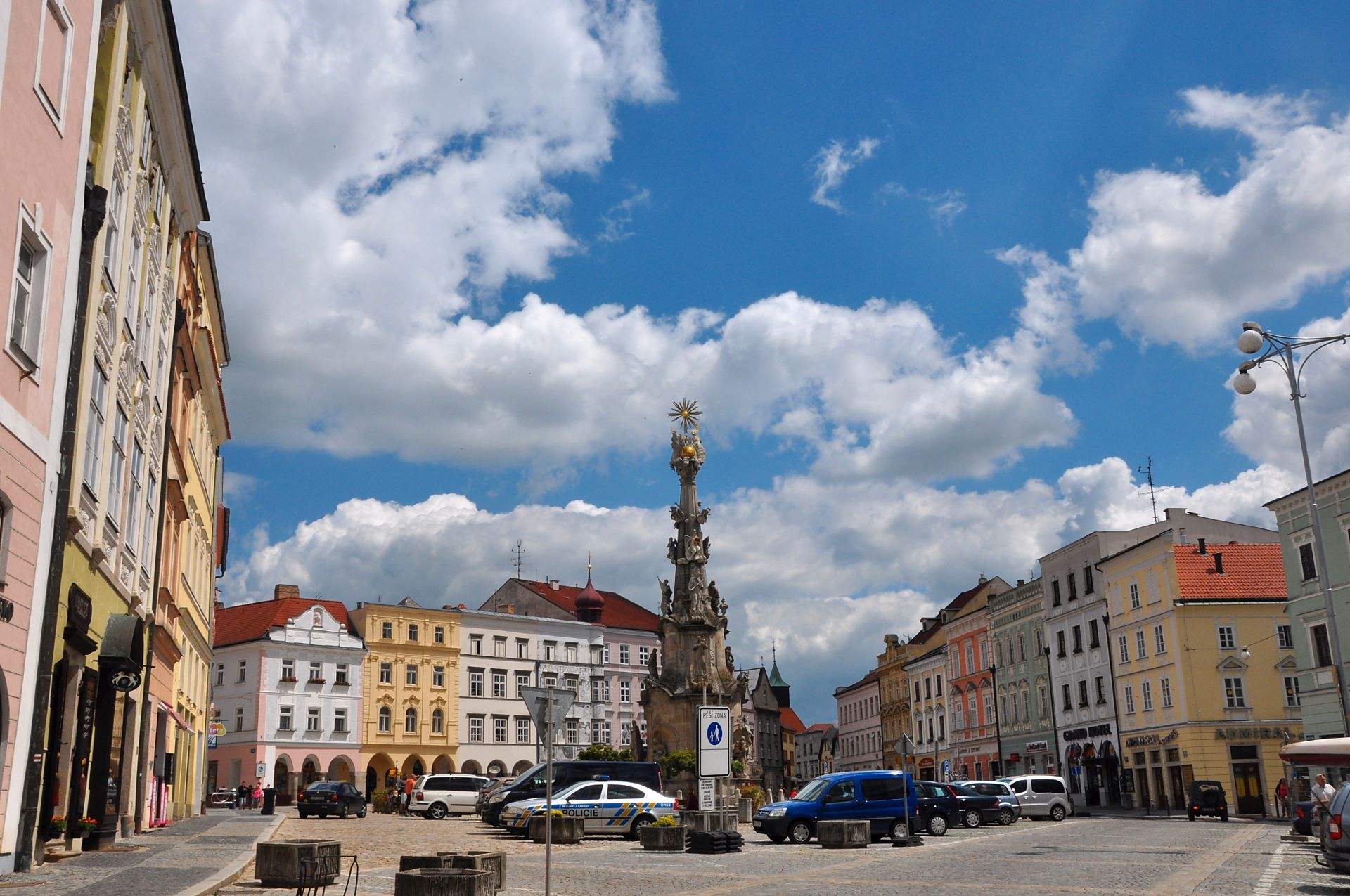
Náměstí Míru with the Holy Trinity column

The town's economy is focused mainly on services. The largest employer in the town is the hospital. The largest industrial companies are DK Open (food producer) and Pollmann CZ (manufacturer of car parts), both employing more than 250 people.

== Transport ==
Jindřichův Hradec is located at the crossroads of two main roads, which are parts of the European route E551: the I/23, which connects the South Bohemian Region with Brno, and the I/34 from České Budějovice to Havlíčkův Brod and Svitavy.

Jindřichův Hradec lies on the railway line from Plzeň to Horní Cerekev via České Budějovice. There is also the Jindřichův Hradec narrow-gauge railway, a pair of narrow-gauge railways heading from Jindřichův Hradec to Nová Bystřice and to Obrataň. It serves mostly as a tourist attraction.

== Education ==
A gymnasium, today known as Gymnázium Vítězslava Nováka, was founded in 1595, making it one of the oldest non-university schools in Central Europe.

== Sport ==
The town's basketball club is GBA Lions Jindřichův Hradec. It played in the National Basketball League until 2018.

== Sights ==
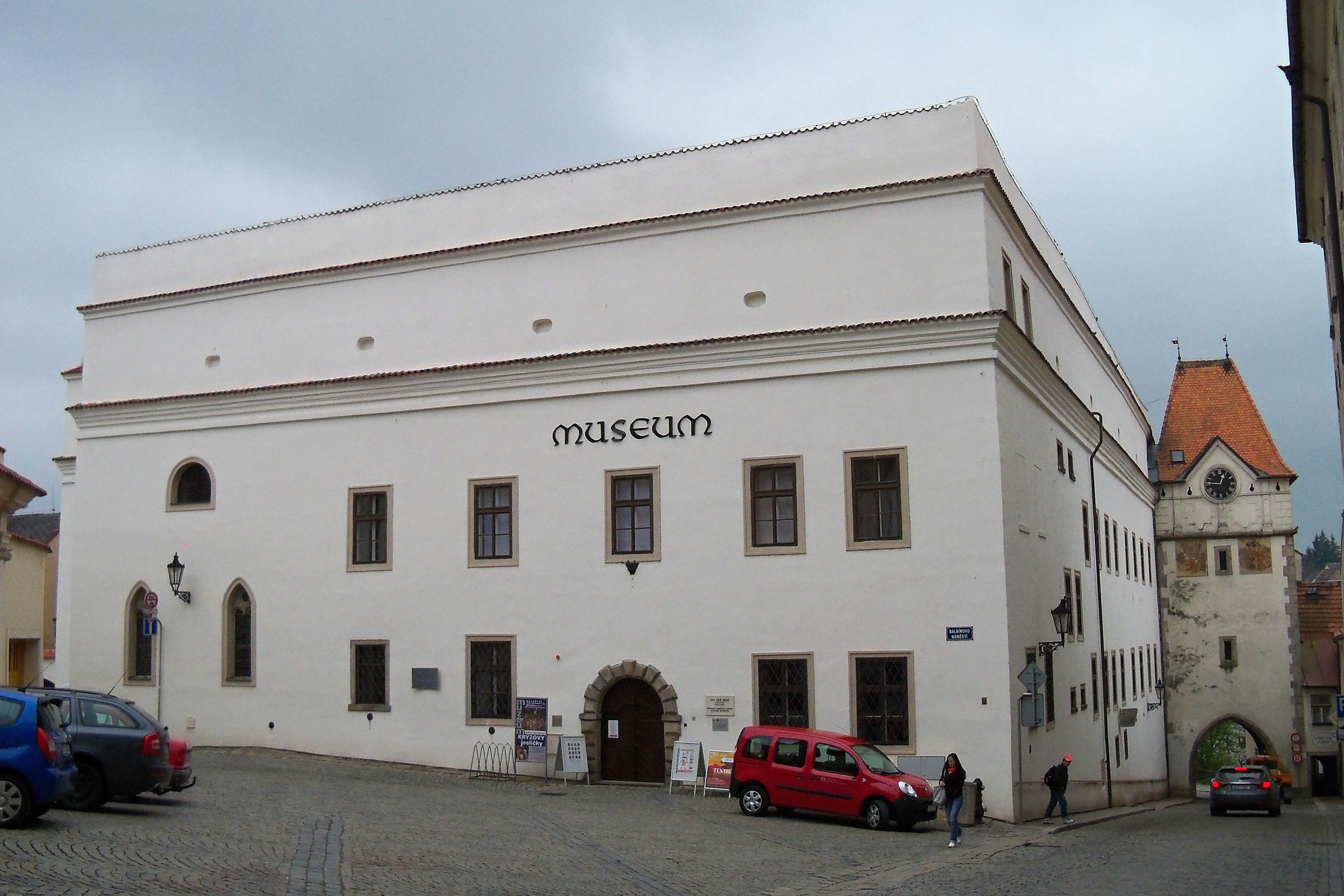
Regional museum

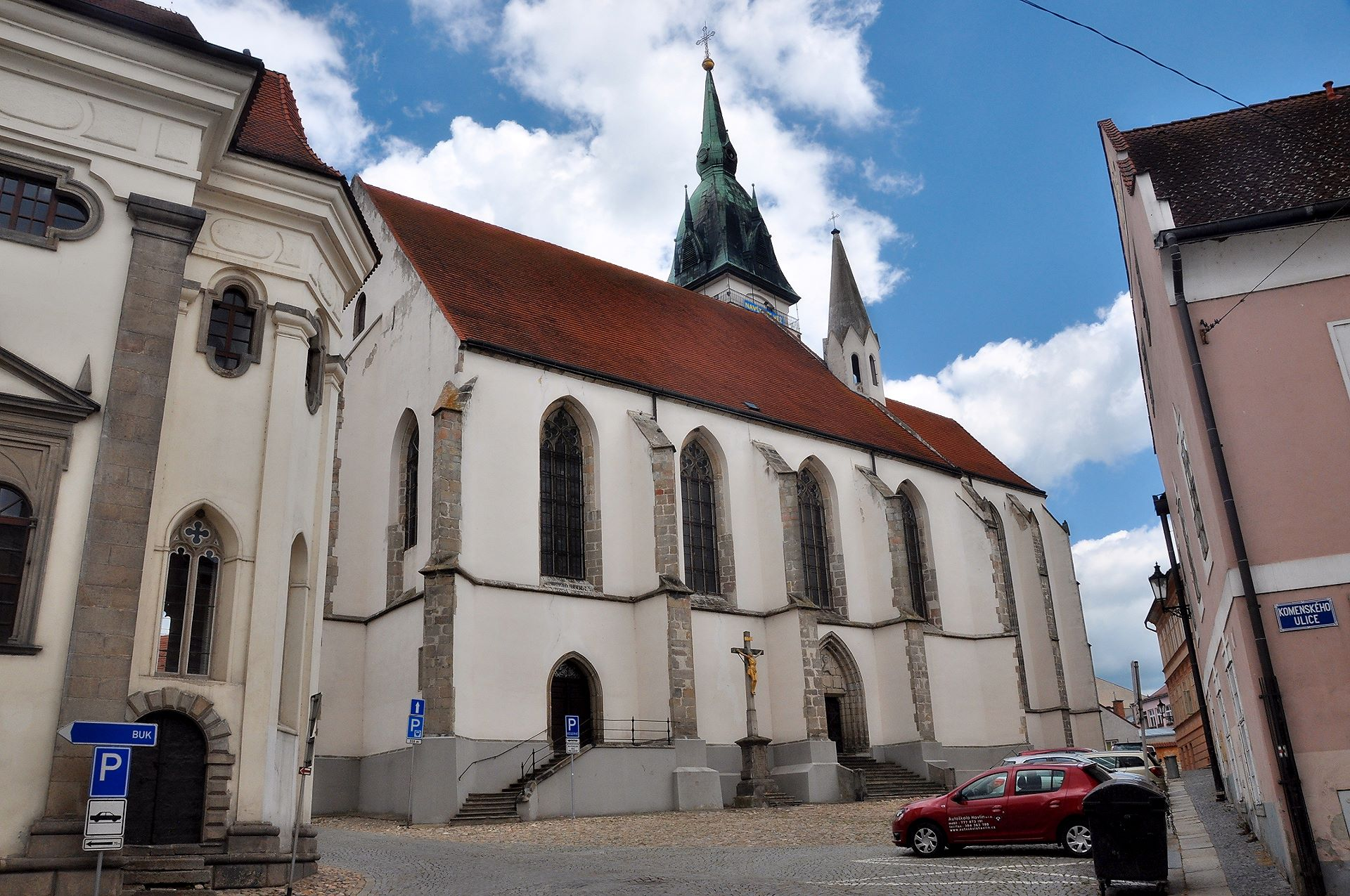
Church of the Assumption of the Virgin Mary

The historic centre of Jindřichův Hradec is formed by the square Náměstí Míru with adjacent streets and the castle. The main landmarks of the square are the former Gothic town hall, which was rebuilt several times, and Langer's house – originally a Gothic building, later rebuilt in the Renaissance style.

The town castle and palace is the third largest in the country after those in Prague and Český Krumlov. It covers nearly 3 ha (7.4 acres). For its value, Jindřichův Hradec Castle is protected as a national cultural monument. Today the Renaissance castle is state-owned and is a major tourist destination, offering guided tours to the public.

The regional museum is located in a Renaissance building that was once the Jesuit seminary. It appeared in the town in 1882 and is one of the oldest regional museums in Bohemia. The most well-known item in the museum is the Krýza's crèche, the largest mechanical nativity scene in the world according to the Guinness Book of World Records.

=== Sacral monuments ===
There are several churches in the town, the most notable of which are the three in the historic centre: Church of Saint John the Baptist with the nearby building that once housed Minorite monks and was later an infirmary, Church of Saint Mary Magdalene, and Church of the Assumption of the Virgin Mary. The Church of Assumption of the Virgin Mary is known for its 68.3 m (224 ft) tall tower open to the public, and for marked 15° meridian that passes through the courtyard of the church.

Other churches include Church of Saint Catherine with a Franciscan monastery, Church of the Holy Trinity, Church of Saint James the Great, Church of Saint Wenceslaus, Evangelical church, and former Church of Saint Elizabeth.

The Jewish cemetery was founded around 1400. The oldest preserved tombstone is from 1638.

== Notable people ==
- Adam Václav Michna z Otradovic (1600–1676), organist, composer and poet
- Florian Baucke (1719–1779), Jesuit missionary
- Hanuš Schwaiger (1852–1912), painter
- Antonín Rezek (1853–1909), political historian
- Stanislaus von Prowazek (1875–1915), zoologist and parasitologist
- Kurt Adler (1907–1977), Austrian-American conductor, chorusmaster and author
- Karel Berman (1919–1995), Jewish opera singer and composer
- Vladimír Špidla (born 1951), politician, Prime Minister of the Czech Republic
- Renáta Tomanová (born 1954), tennis player
- Pavel Kroupa (born 1963), Czech-Australian astrophysicist
- Václav Chalupa (born 1967), rower
- Karel Poborský (born 1972), footballer
- Leoš Friedl (born 1977), tennis player
- Petr Fical (born 1977), German ice hockey player
- Pavel David (born 1978), footballer
- Aleš Kotalík (born 1978), ice hockey player
- Jan Marek (1979–2011), ice hockey player
- Zbyněk Michálek (born 1982), ice hockey player
- Milan Michálek (born 1984), ice hockey player

== Twin towns – sister cities ==
Jindřichův Hradec is twinned with:

- Dunajská Streda, Slovakia
- Neckargemünd, Germany
- Sárospatak, Hungary
- Zwettl, Austria

== See also ==
- 21873 Jindřichůvhradec, an asteroid named in honour of the town
