= Nativity scene =

Representation of the birth of Jesus

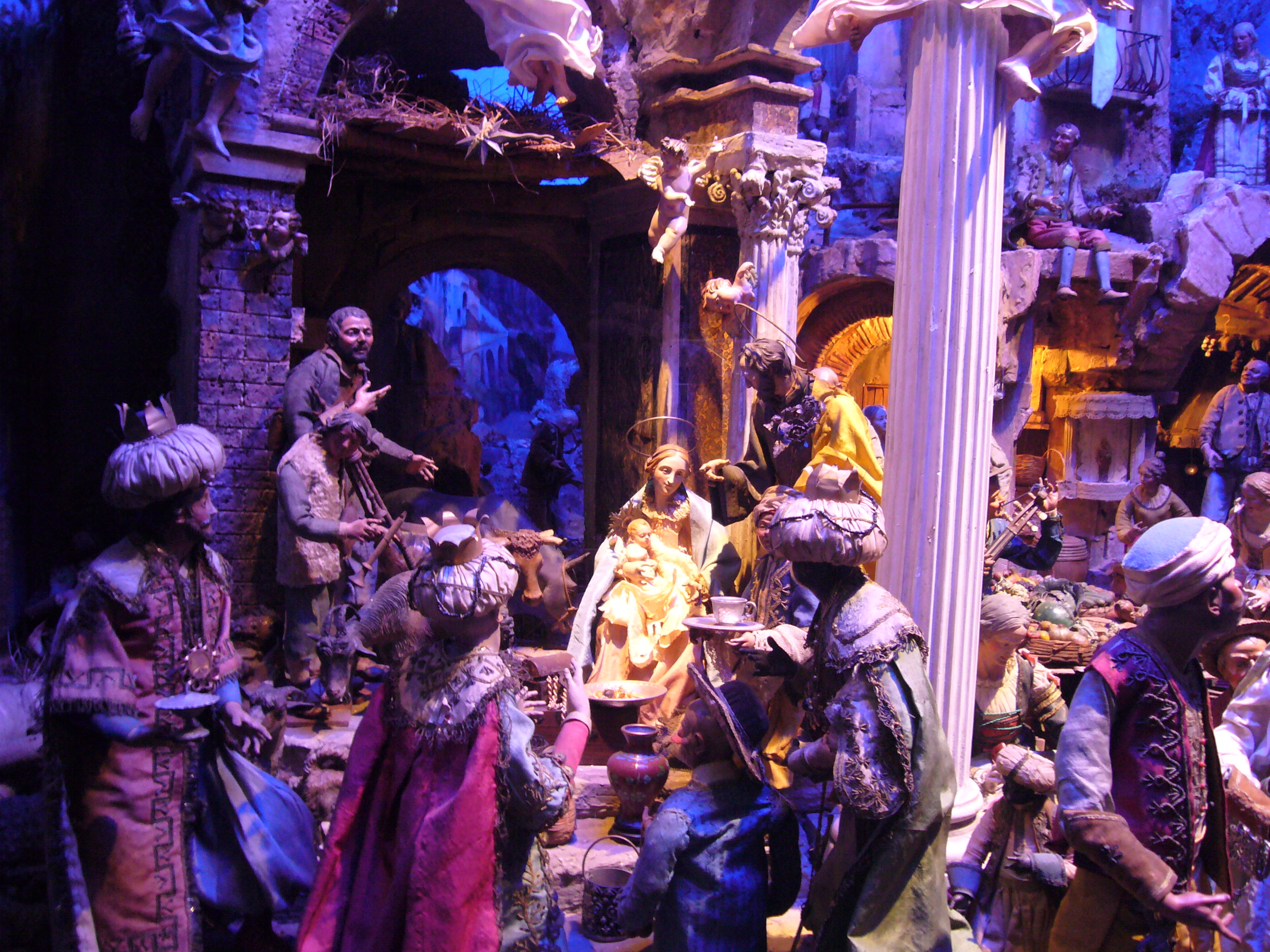
Detail of an elaborate Neapolitan presepio in Rome

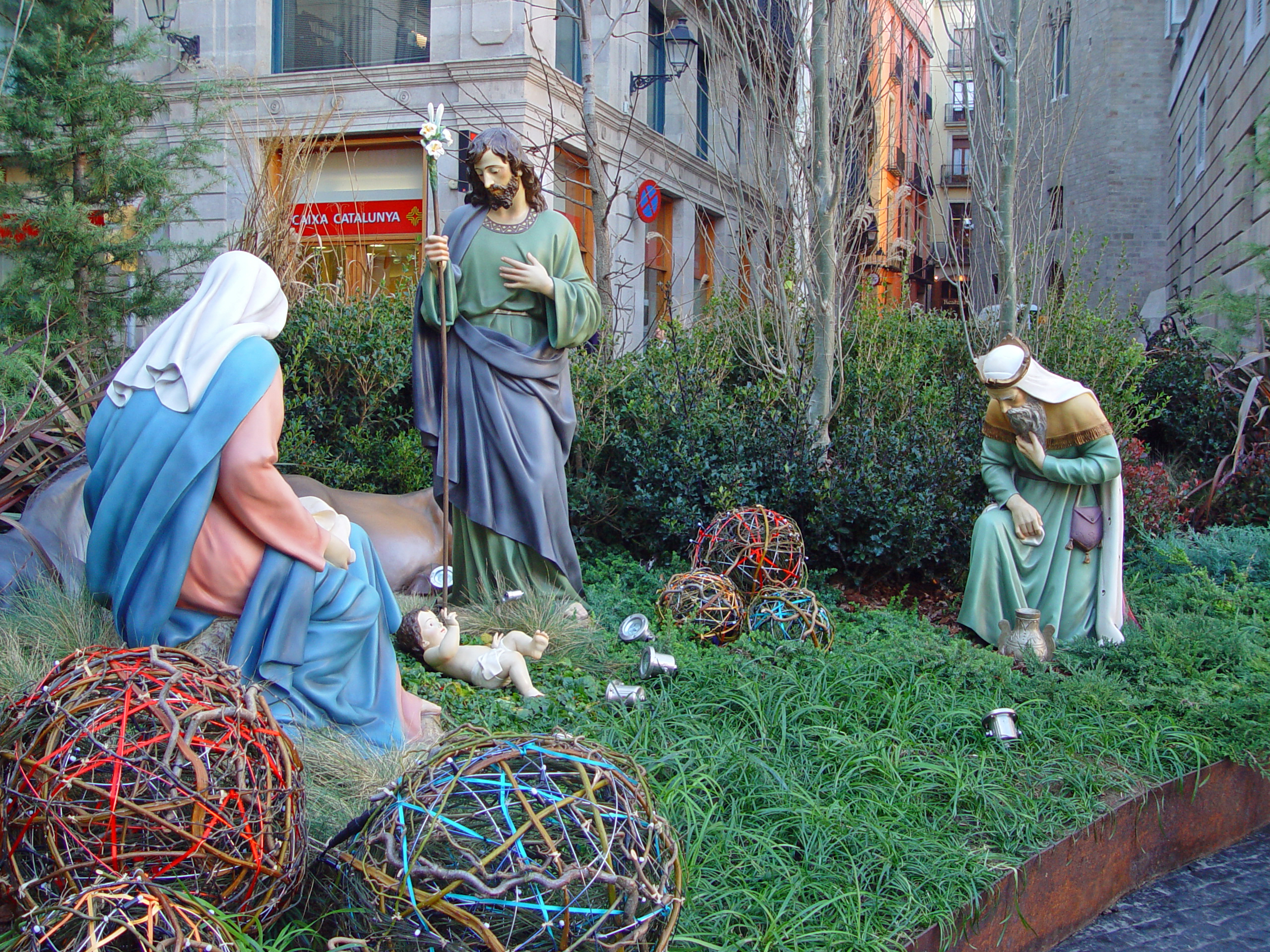
Outdoor nativity scene of life-sized figurines in Barcelona (2009)

In the Christian tradition, a nativity scene, also known as a manger scene, crib or crèche (/krɛʃ/ or /kreɪʃ/, from French; in Italian presepio or presepe; in some other languages also called a "Bethlehem") is the special exhibition, particularly during Christmastide, of art objects representing the birth of Jesus Christ. While the term nativity scene may be used of any representation of the very common subject of the Nativity of Jesus in art, it has a more specialized sense referring to seasonal displays, in particular sets of individual sculptural figures and props that are arranged for display.

Other characters from the nativity story, such as shepherds, sheep, and angels may be displayed near the manger in a barn (or a cave) intended to accommodate farm animals, as described in the Gospel of Luke. A donkey and an ox are typically depicted in the scene, and the Magi and their camels, described in the Gospel of Matthew, are also included. Many also include a representation of the Star of Bethlehem. Several cultures add other characters and objects that may or may not be biblical.

The first nativity scene featuring live actors was organized by Francis of Assisi in 1223 in the Italian town of Greccio. Francis had been inspired by his visit to the Holy Land, where he had been shown the Grotto of the Nativity.

Distinctive nativity scenes and traditions have been created around the world, and are displayed during the Christmas season in churches, homes, shopping malls and other venues, and occasionally on public lands and in public buildings. Nativity scenes have not escaped controversy, and in some countries their inclusion on public lands or in public buildings has provoked court challenges.

== Origins and early history ==
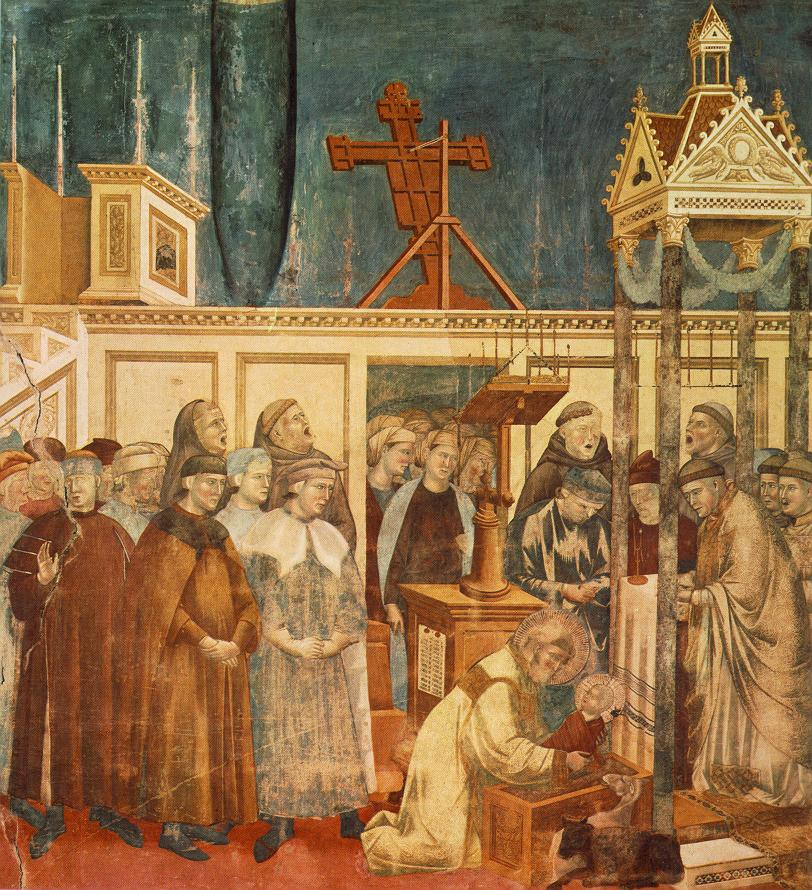
St. Francis at Greccio by Giotto, 1295

The tradition of the nativity scene comes from Italy. One of the earliest representations in art of the nativity was found in the early Christian Roman catacomb of Saint Valentine. It dates to about AD 380. Another, of similar date, is beneath the pulpit in Sant'Ambrogio, Milan, carved on Stilicho's sarcophagus.

The first seasonal nativity scene, which seems to have been a dramatic rather than sculptural rendition, is attributed to Saint Francis of Assisi. Its creation is described by Saint Bonaventure in his Life of Saint Francis of Assisi c. 1260.

Saint Francis' manger scene is said to have been enacted at Christmas 1223 in a cave near the Sanctuary of Greccio in the Central Italy town of Greccio. The very small chapel where it is said to have taken place survives. The painting over its altar, and others before 1400, by Giotto at the Assisi Lower Church, and by Antonio Vite in Pistoia, depict Saint Francis kneeling and placing a small baby into a chest-like manger. Giotto adds a miniature ox and ass.

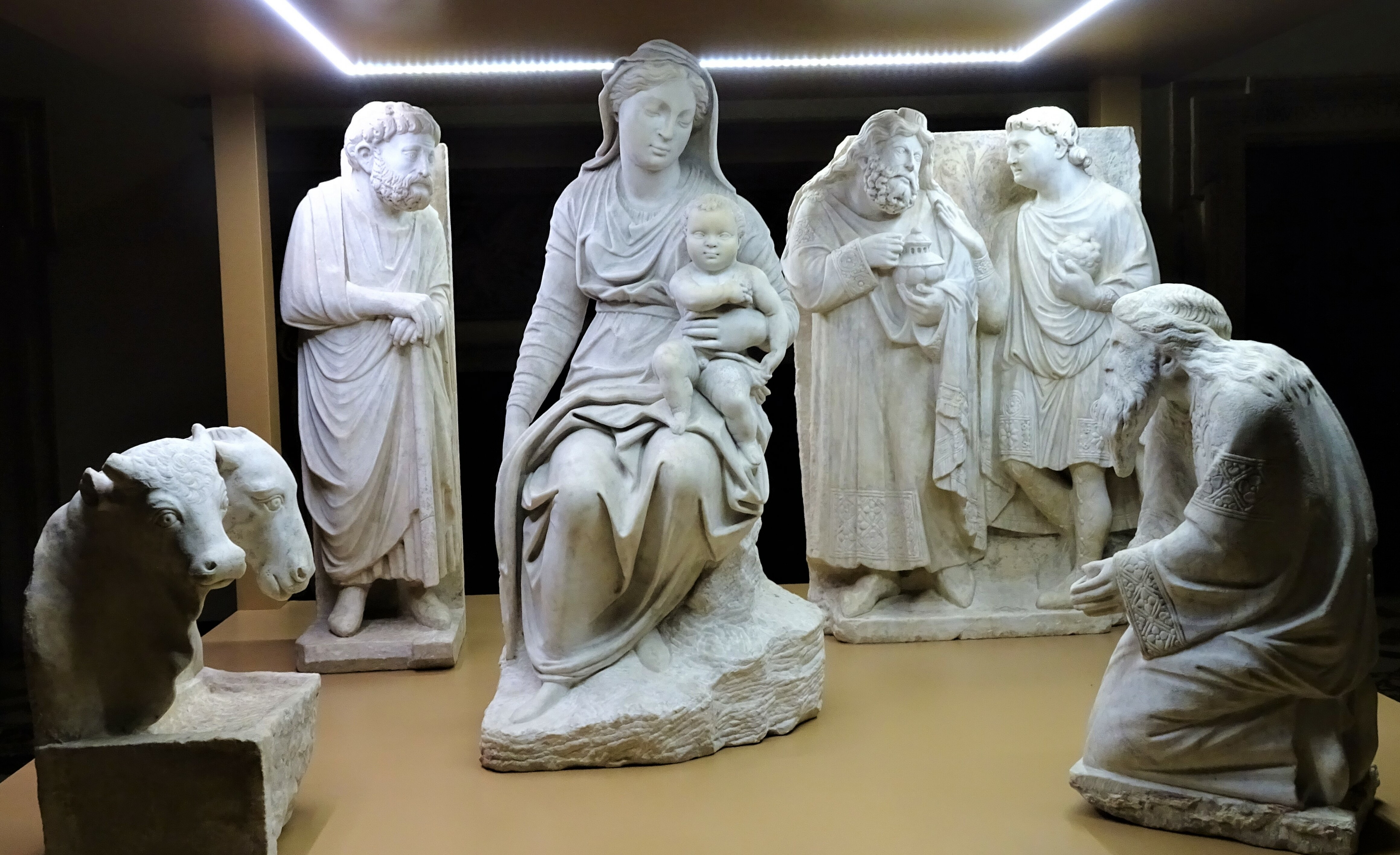
Crib set by Arnolfo di Cambio, Santa Maria Maggiore, Rome c. 1290

A substantial set of stone figures by Arnolfo di Cambio, a leading sculptor of the day, was made for Santa Maria Maggiore in Rome around 1290. The surviving portion includes figures for the Holy Family, the Three Kings, and the ox and ass from the neck up.

The scene's popularity inspired much imitation throughout Christian countries, and in the early modern period sculpted cribs, often exported from Italy, were set up in many Christian churches and homes. These elaborate scenes reached their artistic apogee in the Papal State, in Emilia, in the Kingdom of Naples and in Genoa. In the tradition of the Moravian Church, nativity scenes have been the center of the Christmas putz, which is "built to tell the Good News of the coming of the Christ Child" and "is the Gospel in miniature from Isaiah's prophecy and Mary's annunciation to the visit of the wisemen and the flight into Egypt."

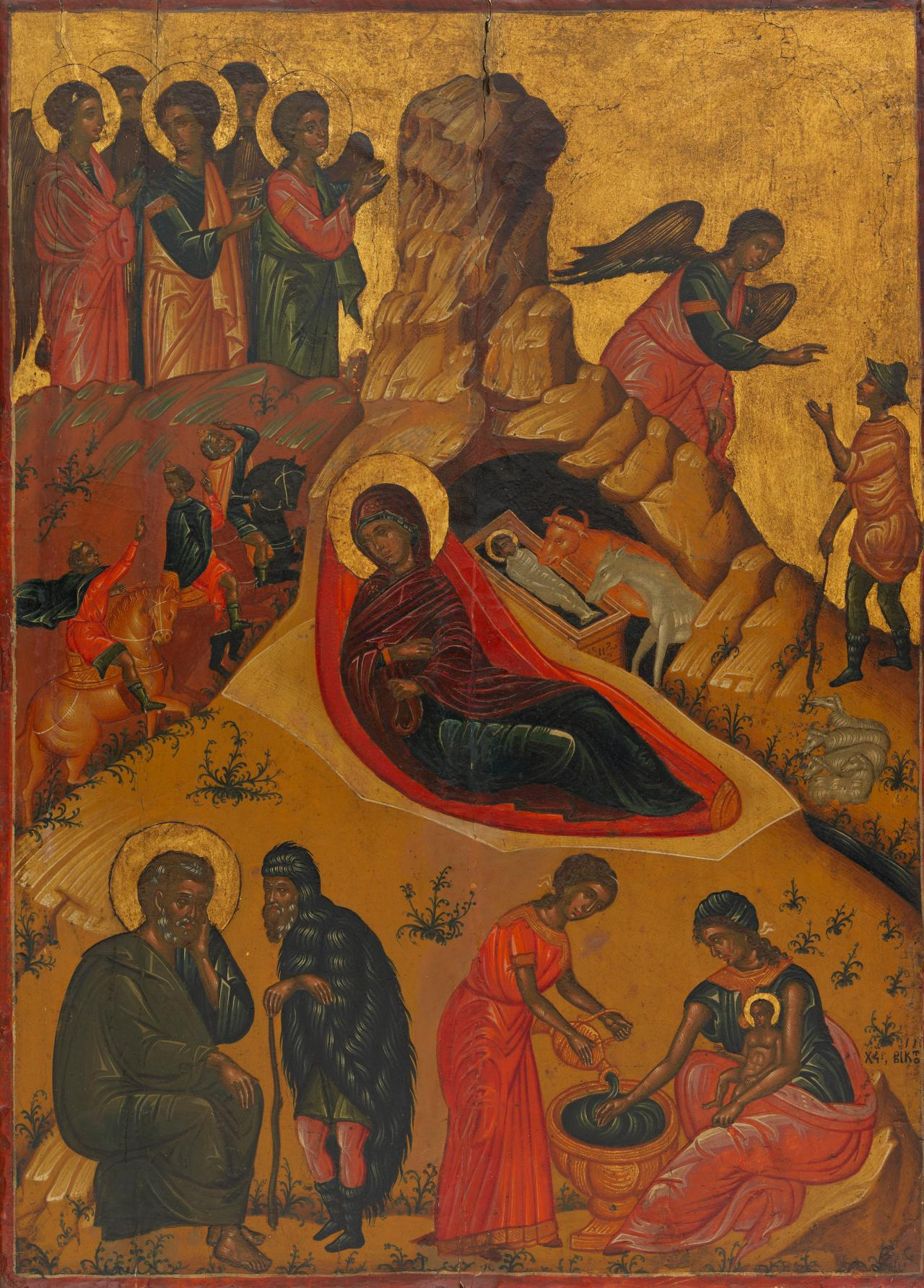
Nativity of Cretan School by Victor circa 1676

For Moravian Christians, the nativity scene serves to celebrate "the story of the wonder of Christ's birth so that the Son of God can be welcomed into the hearts of the home at the Christmas." By the end of the 19th century nativity scenes became widely popular in many Christian denominations, and many versions in various sizes and made of various materials, such as terracotta, paper, wood, wax, and ivory, were marketed, often with a backdrop setting of a stable.

Different traditions of nativity scenes emerged in different countries. Hand-painted santons are popular in Provence. In southern Germany, Austria and Trentino-Alto Adige, the wooden figurines are handcut. Colorful szopki are typical in Poland.

In the United States, the Metropolitan Museum of Art in New York City annually displays a Neapolitan Baroque nativity scene before a 20 feet (6.1 m) blue spruce.

== Components ==
=== Static nativity scenes ===
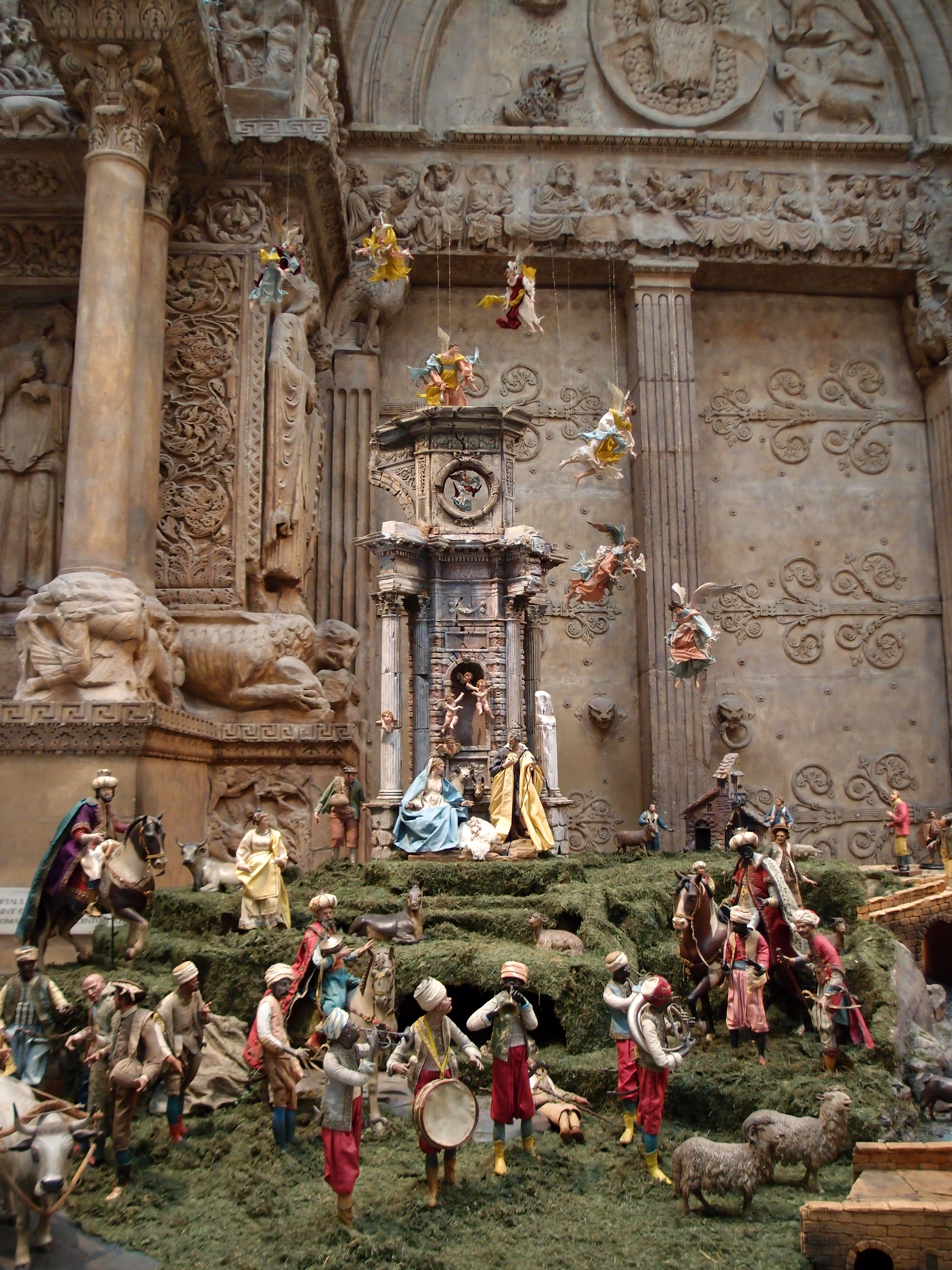
Neapolitan nativity scene at the Carnegie Museum of Art in Pittsburgh

Static nativity scenes depict Jesus, Mary, Joseph, farm animals, and sometimes other characters. While most home nativity scenes are packed away at Christmas or shortly thereafter, nativity scenes in churches usually remain on display until the feast of the Baptism of the Lord.

The nativity scene may not accurately reflect gospel events. With no basis in the gospels, for example, the shepherds, the Magi, and the ox and ass may be displayed together at the manger. The art form can be traced back to eighteenth-century Naples. Neapolitan nativity scenes do not represent Bethlehem at the time of Jesus but the life of the Naples of 1700, during the Bourbon period. Families competed with each other to produce the most elegant and elaborate scenes and so, next to the Child Jesus, to the Holy Family and the shepherds, were placed ladies and gentlemen of the nobility, representatives of the bourgeoisie of the time, vendors with their banks and miniatures of cheese, bread, sheep, pigs, ducks or geese, and typical figures of the time like Roma fortune tellers predicting the future, people playing cards, housewives doing shopping, dogs, cats and chickens.

=== Living nativity scenes ===
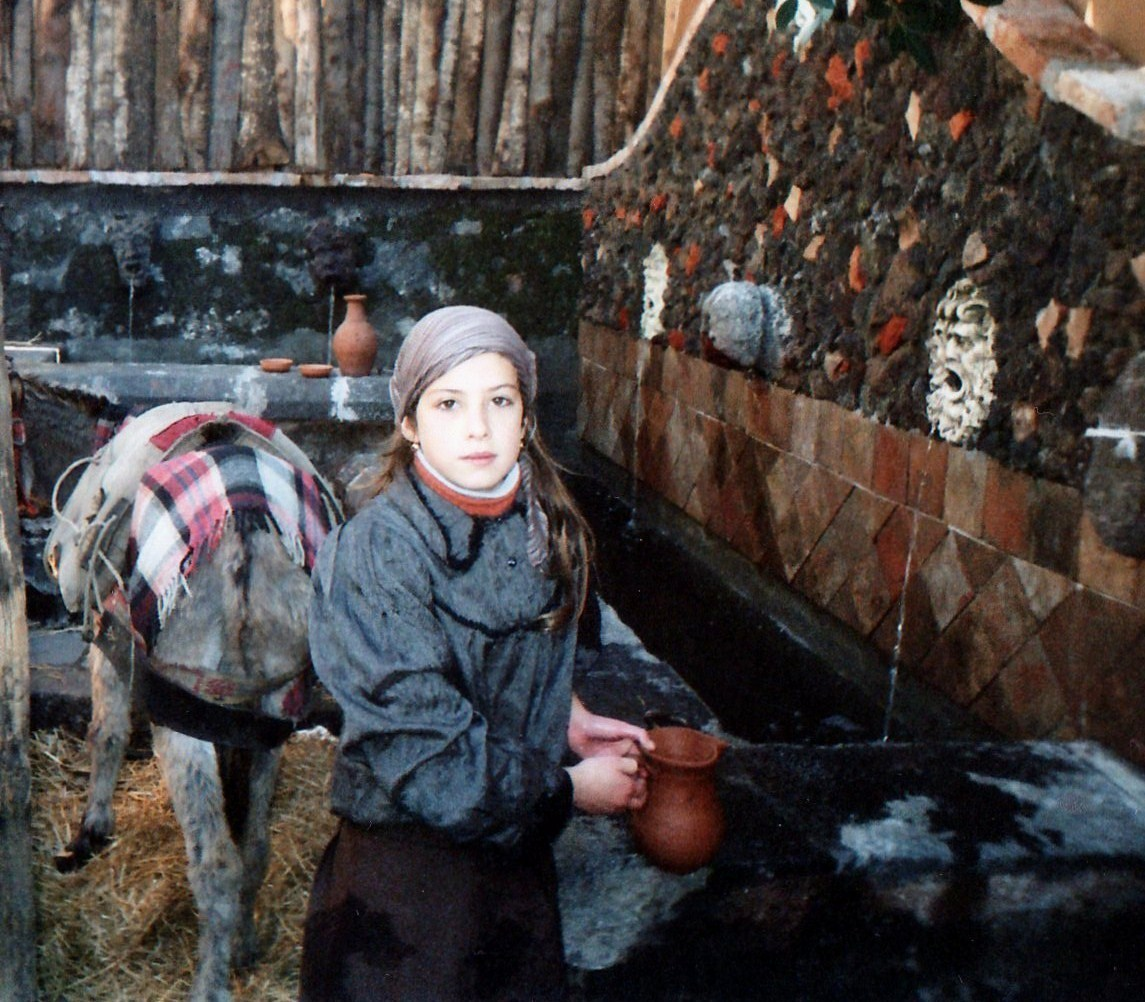
Living nativity in Sicily, which also contains a mock rural 19th-century village

In southern Italy, living nativity scenes (presepe vivente) are extremely popular. They may be elaborate affairs, featuring not only the classic nativity scene but also a mock rural 19th-century village, complete with artisans in traditional costumes working at their trades. These attract many visitors and have been televised on RAI. In 2010, the old city of Matera in Basilicata hosted the world's largest living nativity scene of the time, which was performed in the historic center, Sassi.

=== Animals in nativity scenes ===
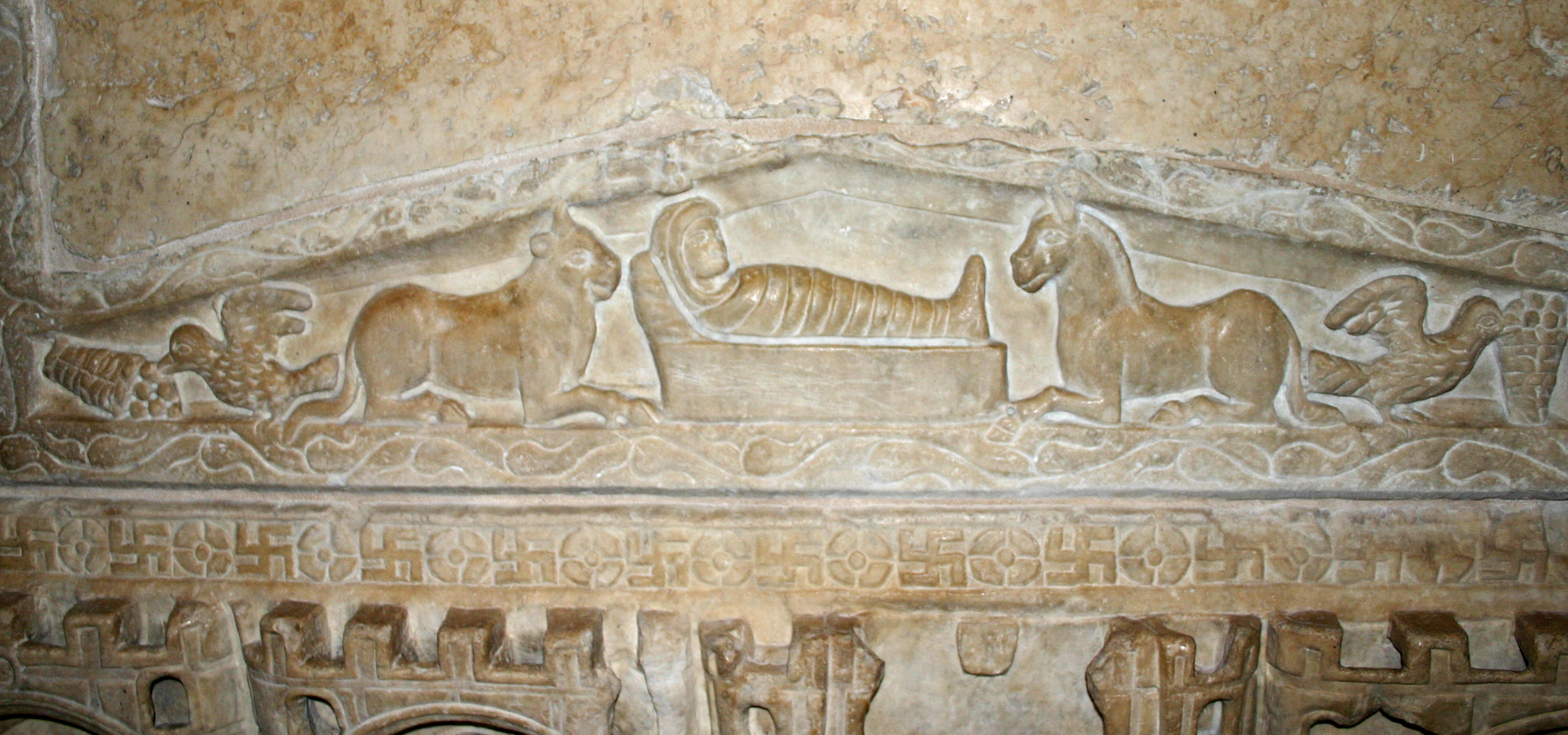
The ox, the ass, and the infant Jesus in one of the earliest depictions of the nativity, (Ancient Roman Christian sarcophagus, 4th century)

A donkey (or ass) and an ox typically appear in nativity scenes. Besides the necessity of animals for an operating manger, this is an allusion to the Book of Isaiah: "the ox knoweth his owner, and the ass his master's crib; but Israel doth not know, my people doth not consider" (Isaiah 1:3). The Gospels mention neither an ox nor a donkey, however. The first Christian writer to mention the ox and the ass in the stable in Bethlehem is Origen of Alexandria. Another source for the tradition might be the extracanonical text, the Gospel of Pseudo-Matthew of the 7th century.

Sheep are often present in Nativity scenes, and reference the shepherds who cared for the animals nearby. Other animals sometimes present are camels, birds, and cattle.

== Traditions ==
=== Australia ===
During Christmas time, locals and visitors visit places around their towns and suburbs to view the outdoor and indoor displays. These displays feature nativity scenes with animals native to Australia, like kangaroos and koalas.

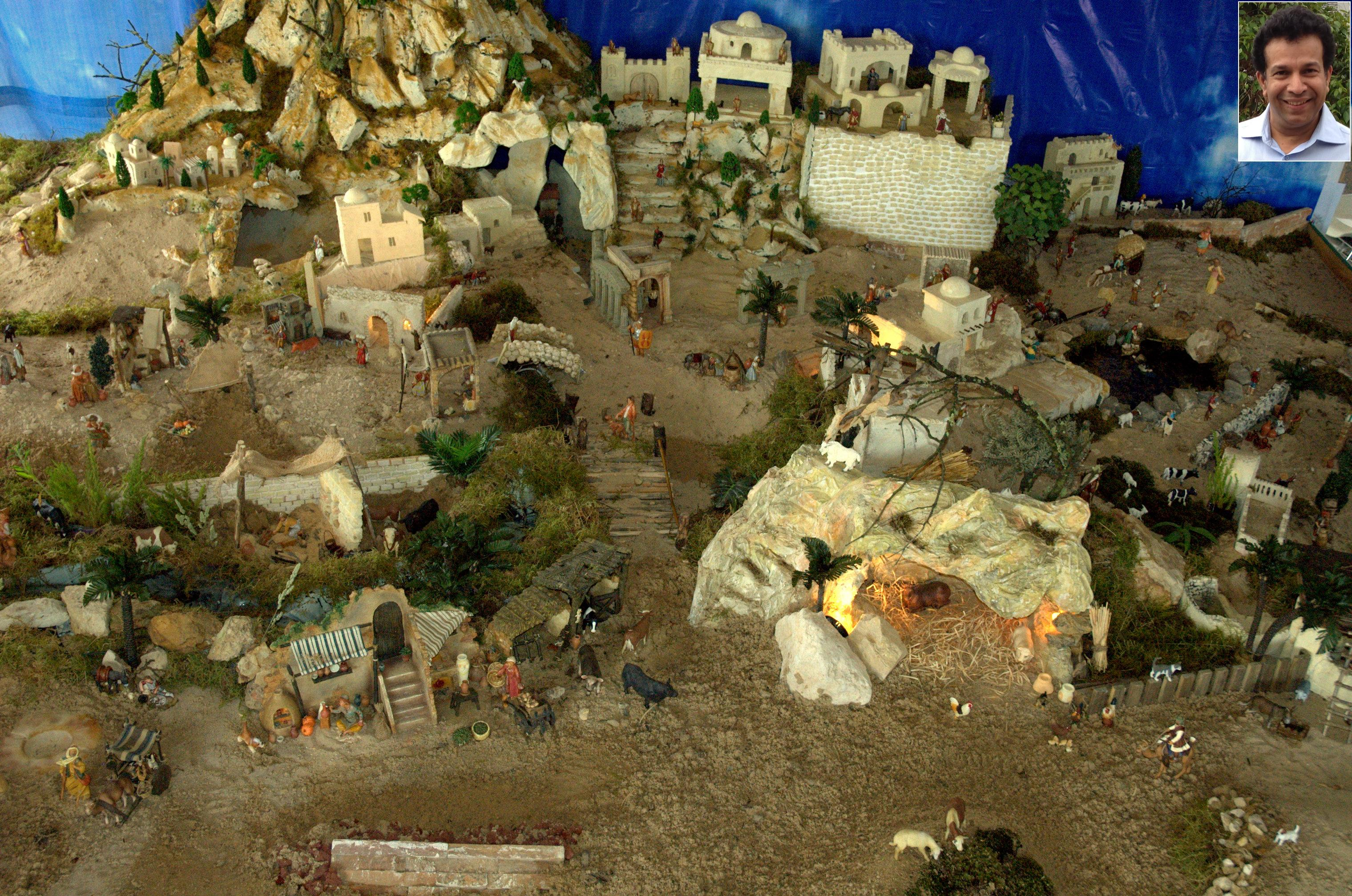
The Australian Nativity Scene at St. Elizabeth's, Dandenong North. Creator, artist Wilson Fernandez inset at top-right.

An expansive miniature nativity scene is on display at St. Elizabeth's Parish, Dandenong North. Celebrated for its scope and detail, it draws a large audience and has been dubbed the "Australian Nativity Scene". Its creator, artist Wilson Fernandez, has been building the traditional nativity scene at St. Elizabeth's Parish since 2003.

To mark its 10th anniversary, Denis Hart, Archbishop of Melbourne, celebrated the Vigil Mass and blessed the Australian Nativity Scene on Saturday, 14 December 2013. Shalom World, a 24/7, commercial-free Catholic television channel broadcast a live telecast of the Australian Nativity Scene on 24 December 2022. On 2 December 2023, the Australian Nativity Scene marked its 20 year anniversary. To mark this occasion, Archbishop Peter A Comensoli blessed the Australian Nativity Scene.

=== Canada ===
Bethlehem Live is an all-volunteer living nativity produced by Gateway Christian Community Church in Winnipeg, Manitoba, Canada. The production includes a reconstruction of the ancient town of Bethlehem and seven individual vignettes. There is also an annual, highly publicized nativity scene at the St. Patrick's Basilica, Ottawa, Ontario.

=== Czech Republic ===
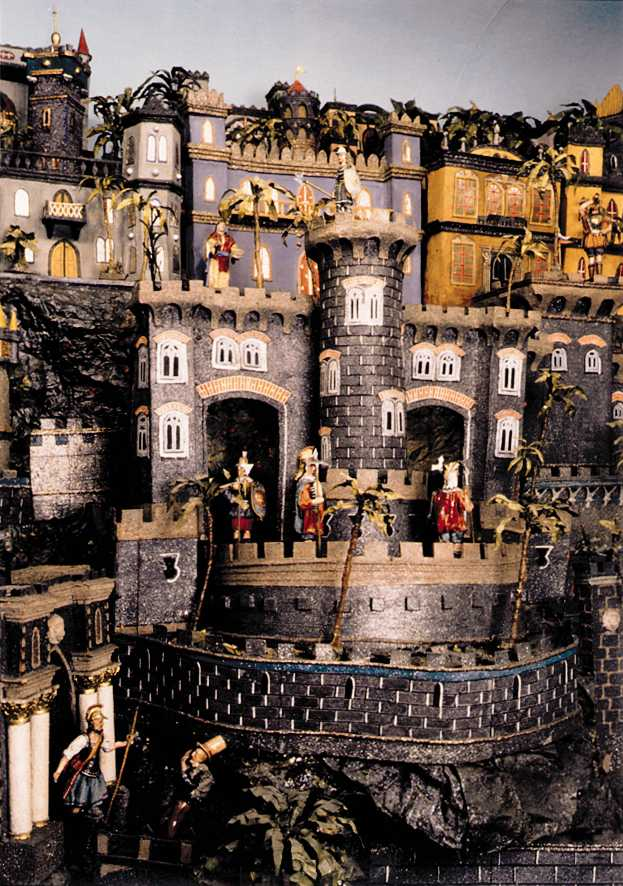
Part of the Krýza's crèche – a castle

The Czech Republic, and the cultures represented in its predecessors i.e. Czechoslovakia and the lands of former Bohemia, have a long tradition regarding betlémy (literally "Bethlehems"), crèches. The tradition of home nativity scenes is often traced to the 1782 ban of church and institutional crèches by emperor Joseph II, officially responding to public disturbances and the resulting "loss of dignity" of such displays. As this followed the Edict of Toleration proclaimed the previous year, it reduced State support of the Catholic church in this multi-confessional land.

==== Třebechovice pod Orebem ====
The Museum of Nativity Scenes in Třebechovice pod Orebem has over 400 examples dated from the 18th until early 20th century, including the Probošt's mechanical Christmas crib, so called Třebechovice's Bethlehem.

The issue of cost arose, and paper-cut crèches, "the crèche of the poor", became one major expression, as well as wood-carved ones, some of them complex and detailed. Many major Czech artists, sculptors and illustrators have as a significant part of their legacy the crèches that they created.

The following people are known for creating Czech paper crèches:

- Mikoláš Aleš (1852–1913), painter famed for his murals of the National Theatre
- Josef Wenig (1885–1939), illustrator, theatre decorator and playwright
- Josef Lada (1887–1957), known for his work in The Good Soldier Švejk
- Marie Fischerová-Kvěchová (1892–1984), illustrator of a large number of children books

==== Krýza's crèche ====
Tomáš Krýza (1838–1918) built in a period of over 60 years a nativity scene covering 60 m^{2} (length 17 m, size and height 2 m) which contains 1,398 figures of humans and animals, of which 133 are moveable. It is on display in southern Bohemian town Jindřichův Hradec. It figures as the largest mechanical nativity scene in the world in the Guinness Book of World Records.

==== Gingerbread crèches ====
Gingerbread nativity scenes and cribs in the church of St. Matthew in Šárka (Prague 6 Dejvice) have around 200 figures and houses, the tradition dates from since 1972; every year new ones are baked and after holidays eaten.

=== Italy ===
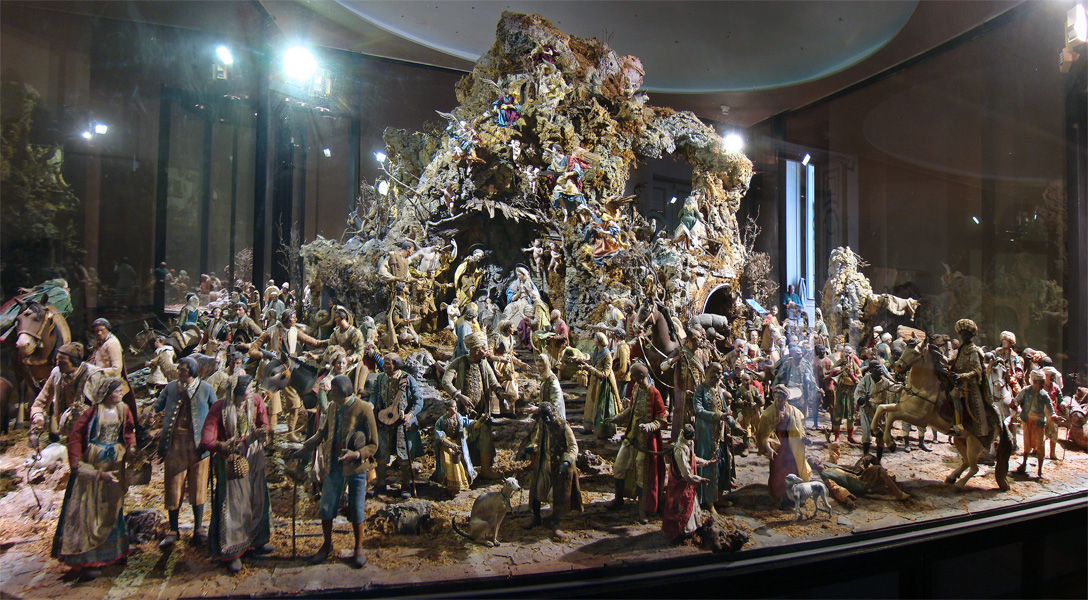
The Neapolitan nativity scene of the Royal Palace of Caserta.

Christmas in Italy begins on 8 December with the Feast of the Immaculate Conception, the day on which traditionally Christmas trees are erected, and ends on 6 January of the following year with Epiphany.

The Neapolitan nativity scene is a representation of the birth of Jesus traditionally set in Naples in the 18th century. The Neapolitan crib art has remained unchanged for centuries, becoming part of the most consolidated and followed Christmas traditions of the city. Famous in Naples, in fact, is the well-known via dei presepi (via San Gregorio Armeno) which offers a showcase of all the local crafts concerning the nativity scene.

Moreover, there are numerous city and non-city museums (such as the museum of San Martino or the Royal Palace of Caserta) in which historical pieces or entire scenes set during the birth of Jesus are exhibited.

=== Philippines (Belén) ===
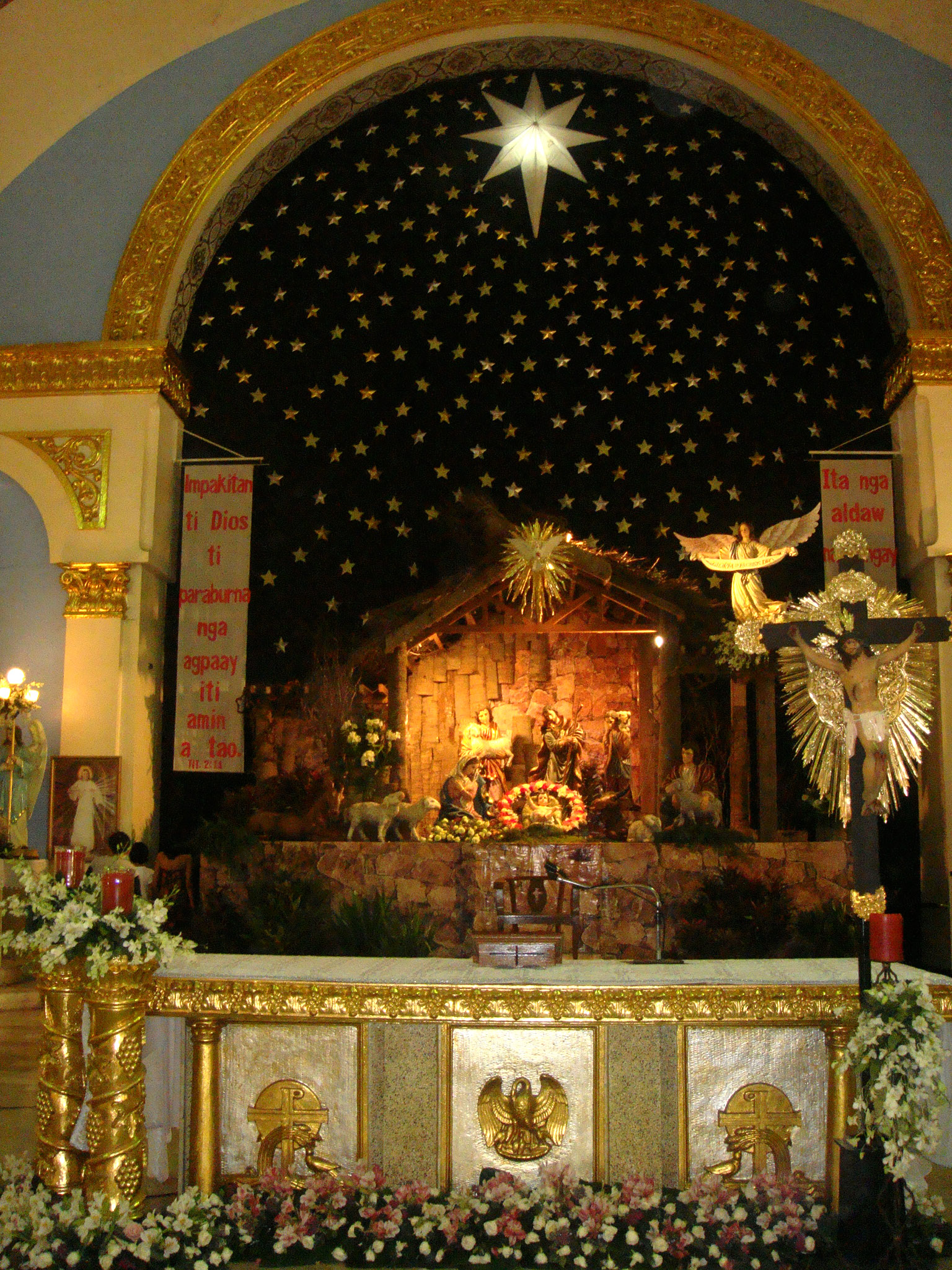
A Belén set up in the altar of the Candon Church in the Philippines with a parol above it

In the majority-Catholic Philippines, miniature, full-scale, or giant dioramas or tableaus of the nativity scene are known as Belén (from the Spanish name for Bethlehem). They were introduced by the Spanish in the 16th century. They are an iconic and ubiquitous Christmas symbol in the Philippines, on par with the parol (Christmas lanterns depicting the Star of Bethlehem) which are often incorporated into the scene as the source of illumination. Both the Belén and the parol were the traditional Christmas decorations in Filipino homes before Americans introduced the Christmas tree. Most churches in the Philippines also transform their altars into a Belén at Christmas. They are also found in schools (which also hold nativity plays), government buildings, commercial establishments, and in public spaces.

The city of Tarlac holds an annual competition of giant Belén in a festival known as "Belenismo sa Tarlac".

=== United States ===
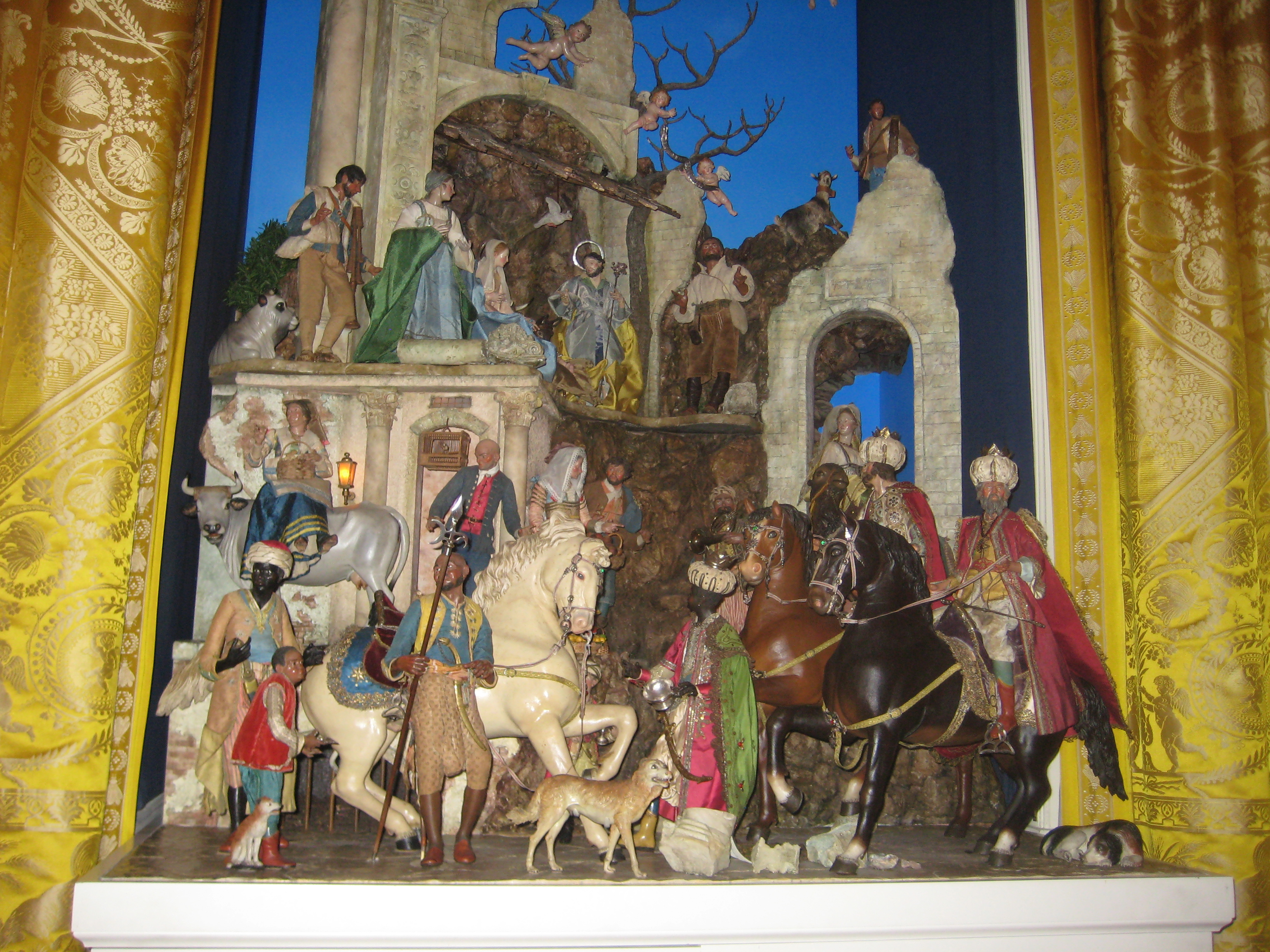
White House nativity scene, 2008

Perhaps the best known nativity scene in America is the Neapolitan Baroque Crèche displayed annually in the Medieval Sculpture Hall of the Metropolitan Museum of Art in New York City. Its backdrop is a 1763 choir screen from the Cathedral of Valladolid and a twenty-foot blue spruce decorated with a host of 18th-century angels. The nativity figures are placed at the tree's base. The crèche was the gift of Loretta Hines Howard in 1964, and the choir screen was the gift of The William Randolph Hearst Foundation in 1956. Both this presepio and the one displayed in Pittsburgh originated from the collection of Eugenio Catello.

A life-size nativity scene has been displayed annually at Temple Square in Salt Lake City, Utah for several decades as part of the large outdoor Christmas displays sponsored by the Church of Jesus Christ of Latter-day Saints.

Each holiday season, from Light Up Night in November through Epiphany in January, the Pittsburgh Crèche is on display in downtown Pittsburgh, Pennsylvania. The Pittsburgh Creche is the world's only authorized replica of the Vatican's Christmas crèche, on display in St. Peter's Square in Rome. Pittsburgh's Carnegie Museum of Art also displays a Neapolitan presepio. The presepio was handcrafted between 1700 and 1830, and re-creates the nativity within a panorama of 18th-century Italian village life. More than 100 human and angelic figures, along with animals, accessories, and architectural elements, cover 250 square feet and create a depiction of the nativity as seen through the eyes of Neapolitan artisans and collectors.

The Radio City Christmas Spectacular, an annual musical holiday stage show presented at Radio City Music Hall in New York City, features a Living Nativity segment with live animals.

In 2005, President of the United States of America, George W. Bush and his wife, First Lady of the United States, Laura Bush displayed an 18th-century Italian presepio. The presepio was donated to the White House in the last decades of the 20th century.

The Metropolitan Museum of Art in New York City and the Carnegie Museum of Art in Pittsburgh annually display Neapolitan Baroque nativity scenes which both originated from the collection of Eugenio Catello.

=== Spain ===
Within the realm of legend, there is speculation that it was in San Cristóbal de La Laguna, Tenerife, where a nativity scene was first publicly displayed in a private home in Spain. Likewise, the Tenerifean saint Peter of Betancur, a Franciscan and founder of the Bethlehemite Brothers in the 17th century, is credited with being one of the main precursors of nativity scene design in the American lands discovered by the Spanish. This is precisely one of the reasons why this saint is often called the "Saint Francis of Assisi of the Americas".

== Associations and notable collections ==
The Universalis Foederatio Praesepistica, World association of Friends of Cribs was founded in 1952, counting today 20 national associations dedicated to this subject. The Central office is in Austria.

In the United States and Canada Friends of the Creche has over 200 members, with a major conference every two years. FotC maintains a list of permanent exhibits of nativity scenes in the United States and a list of permanent exhibits of nativity scenes in other parts of the world.

The Bavarian National Museum displays a notable collection of nativity scenes from the fifteenth through nineteenth centuries.

Every year in Lanciano, Abruzzo (Italy), a nativity scene exhibition (called in Italian "Riscopriamo il presepe") takes place at Auditorium Diocleziano, usually until 6 January. An average of one hundred nativity scenes are shown, coming from every region of Italy. There are also many nativity scenes made by local kindergarten, primary, secondary and high school. The event is organised by Associazione Amici di Lancianovecchia.

Museums dedicated specifically to paper nativity scenes exist in Pečky (Czech Republic).

== Controversies ==
=== Europe ===
Nativity scenes have on some occasions been the subject of controversy. A life-sized scene in the United Kingdom featuring waxwork celebrities provoked outrage in 2004, and, in Spain, a city council forbade the exhibition of a traditional toilet humor character in a public nativity scene.

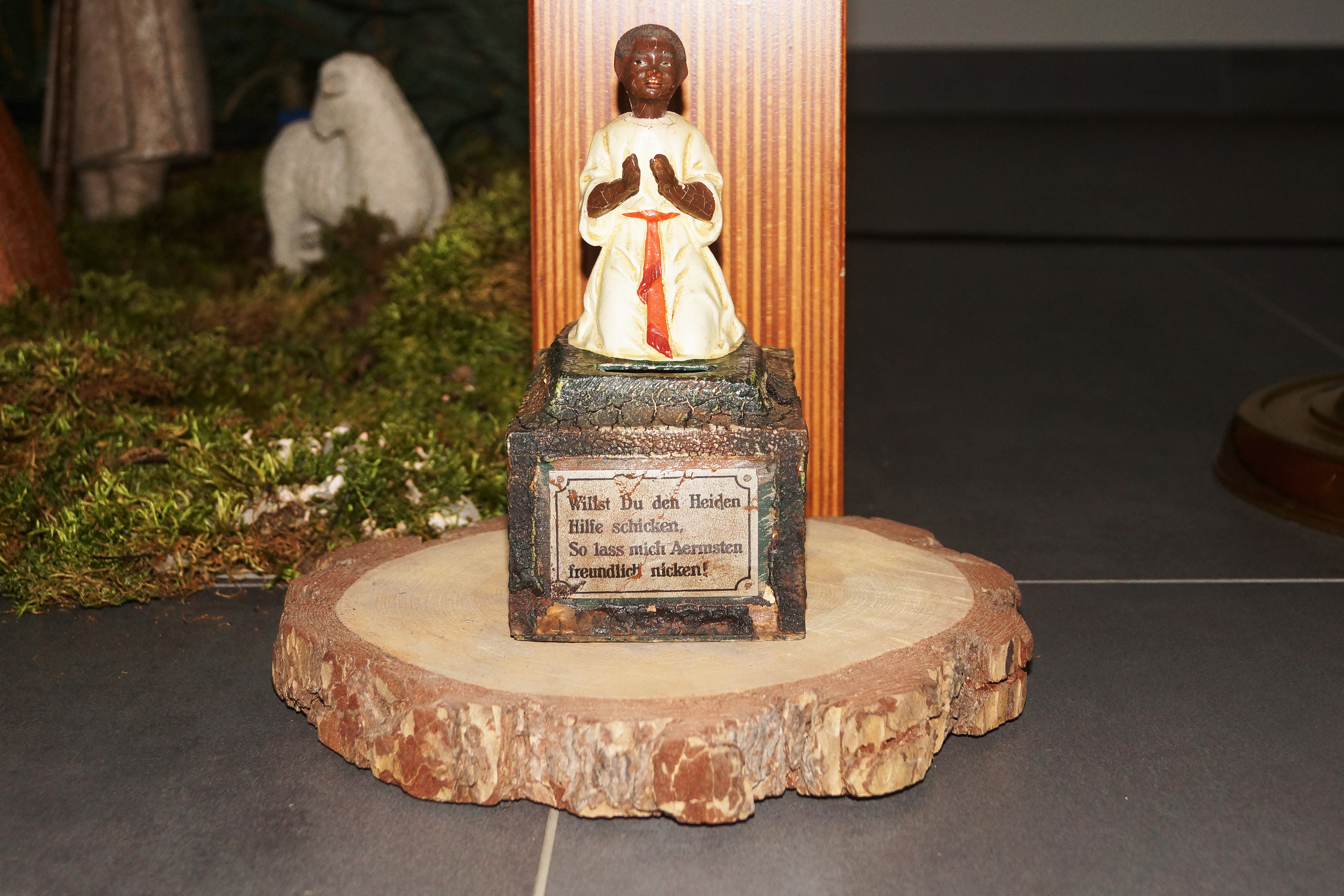
A Nickneger figure in a nativity scene. Text translation: "If you want to send help to the heathen, let me, the poorest, nod kindly."

The tradition in German-speaking countries of depicting black people in the mission money boxes under the name "Nickneger" has been sharply criticized as racist.

=== United States ===
Nativity scenes have been involved in controversies and lawsuits surrounding the principle of accommodationism.

In 1969, the American Civil Liberties Union did not want a nativity scene at The Ellipse. After the matter was resolved by the United States Court of Appeals, the nativity scene was not displayed in 1973.

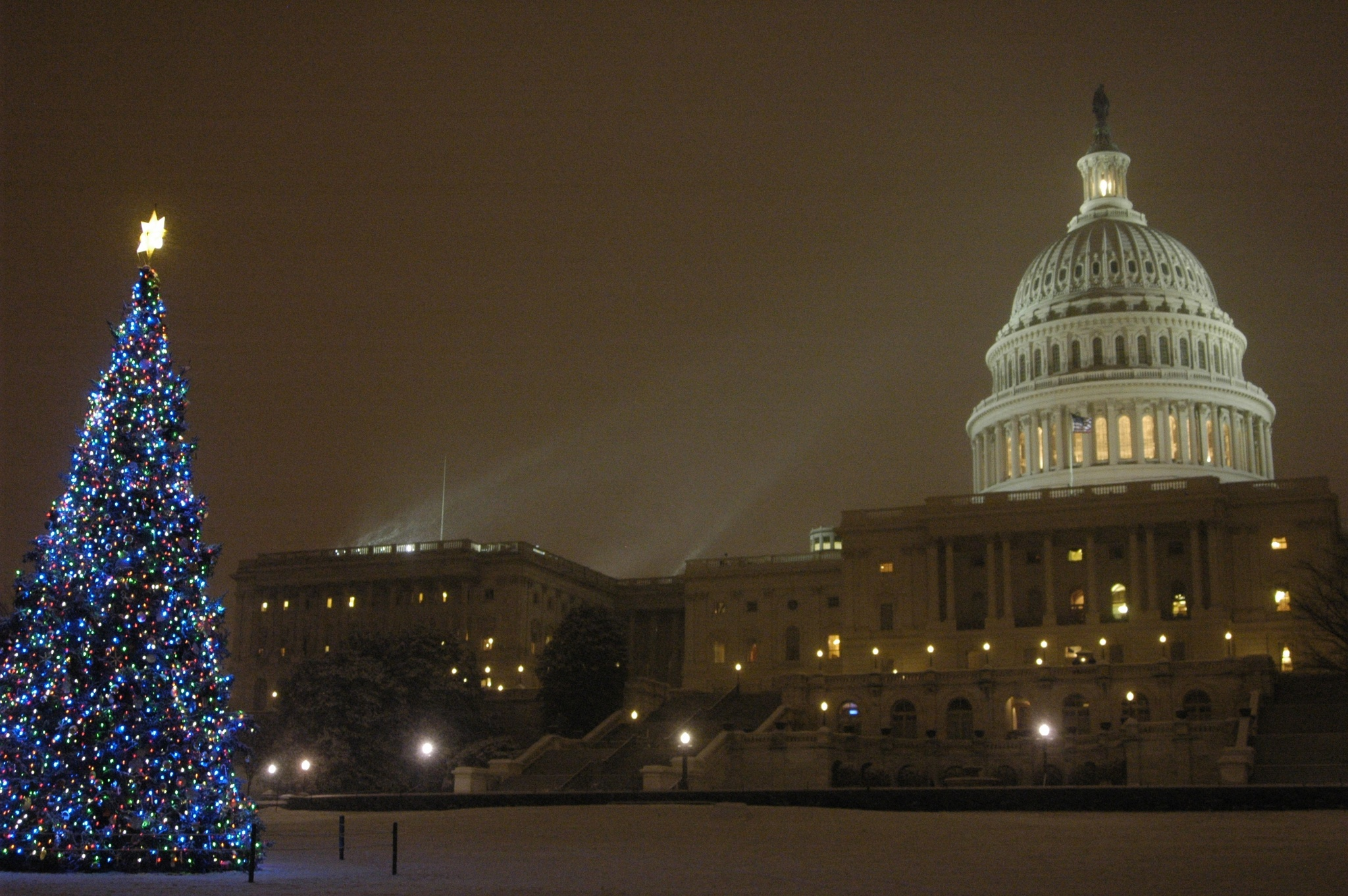
Nativity scenes are permitted on public lands in the United States as long as equal time is given to non-religious symbols.

In 1985, the United States Supreme Court ruled in ACLU v. Scarsdale, New York that nativity scenes on public lands were unconstitutional unless they also displayed non-religious symbols. This principle was further clarified in 1989, when Pittsburgh attorney Roslyn Litman argued, and the Supreme Court in County of Allegheny v. ACLU ruled, that a crèche placed on the grand staircase of the Allegheny County Courthouse in Pittsburgh, PA violated the Establishment Clause, because the "principal or primary effect" of the display was to advance religion.

In 2006, a lawsuit by the Alliance Defense Fund, a Christian legal organization in the United States, was brought against the state of Washington when it permitted a public display of a holiday tree and a menorah but not a nativity scene. Because of the lawsuit, the decision was made to permit a nativity scene to be displayed in the rotunda of the state Capitol, in Olympia, as long as other symbols of the season were included.

In 2013, Gov. Rick Perry signed into Texas law the Merry Christmas bill which would allow school districts in Texas to display nativity scenes.

People for the Ethical Treatment of Animals (PETA) claimed in 2014 that animals in living displays lacked proper care and suffered abuse. In the United States, nativity scenes on public lands and in public buildings have provoked court challenges, and the prankish theft of ceramic or plastic nativity figurines from outdoor displays has become commonplace.

=== Spain ===
There is a regional tradition in the Catalonia region where an additional figure is added to the nativity scene: the Caganer. It depicts a person defecating. In 2005, the Barcelona city council provoked a public outcry by commissioning a nativity scene which did not include a Caganer.

== Gallery ==
The Chapel of the First Live Nativity, in Greccio Italy, is believed to be where Saint Francis of Assisi presented the first live nativity scene.

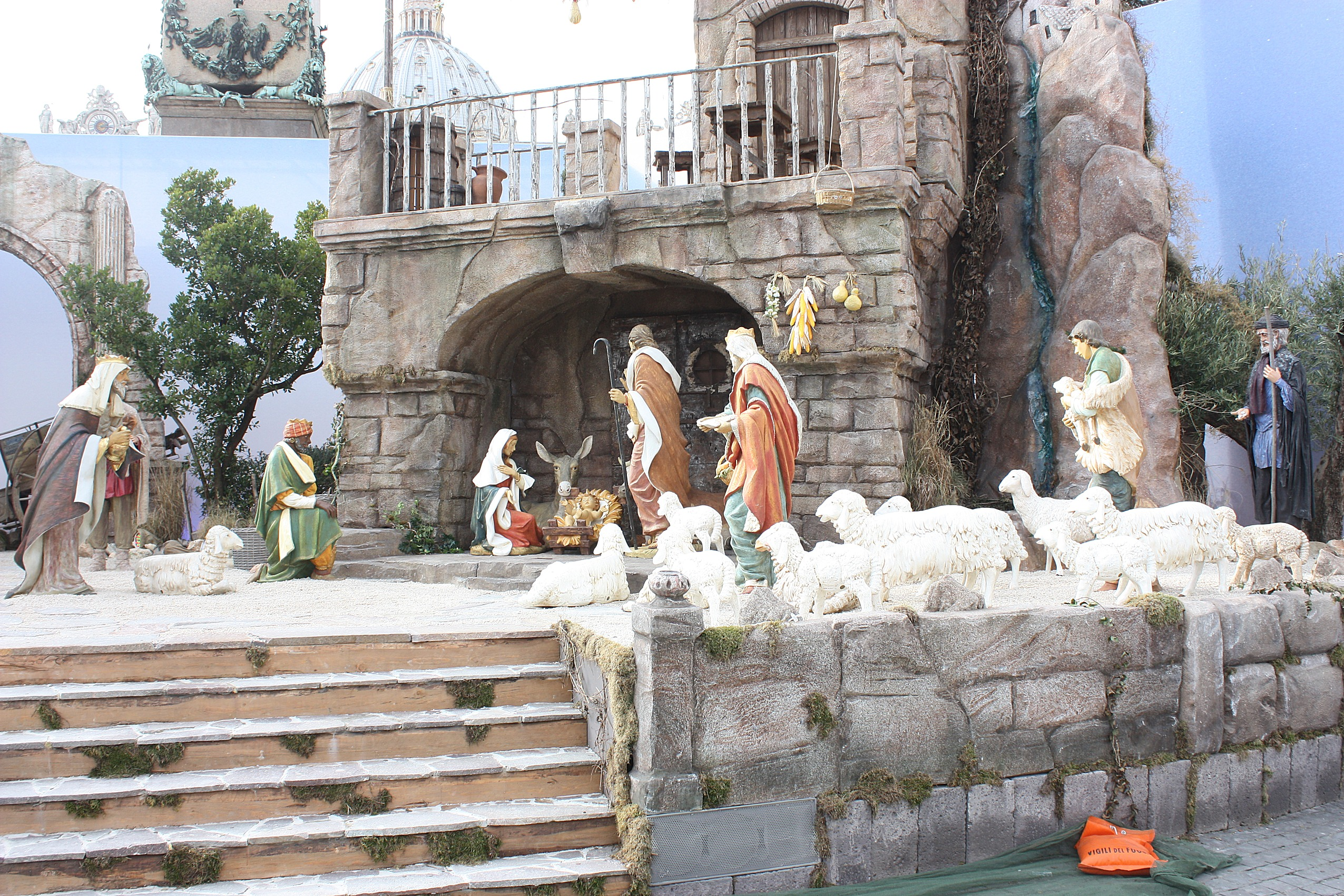
Christmas crib on the Saint Peter's square, Vatican

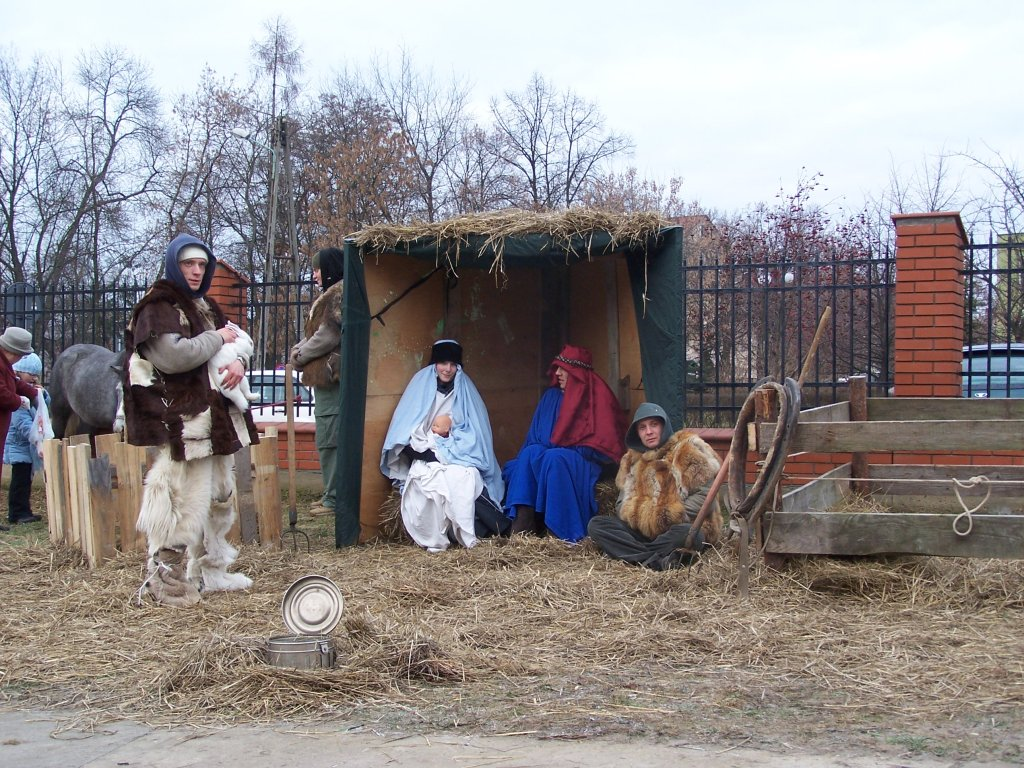
Living nativity at St. Wojciech Church, Wyszków, Poland, 2006

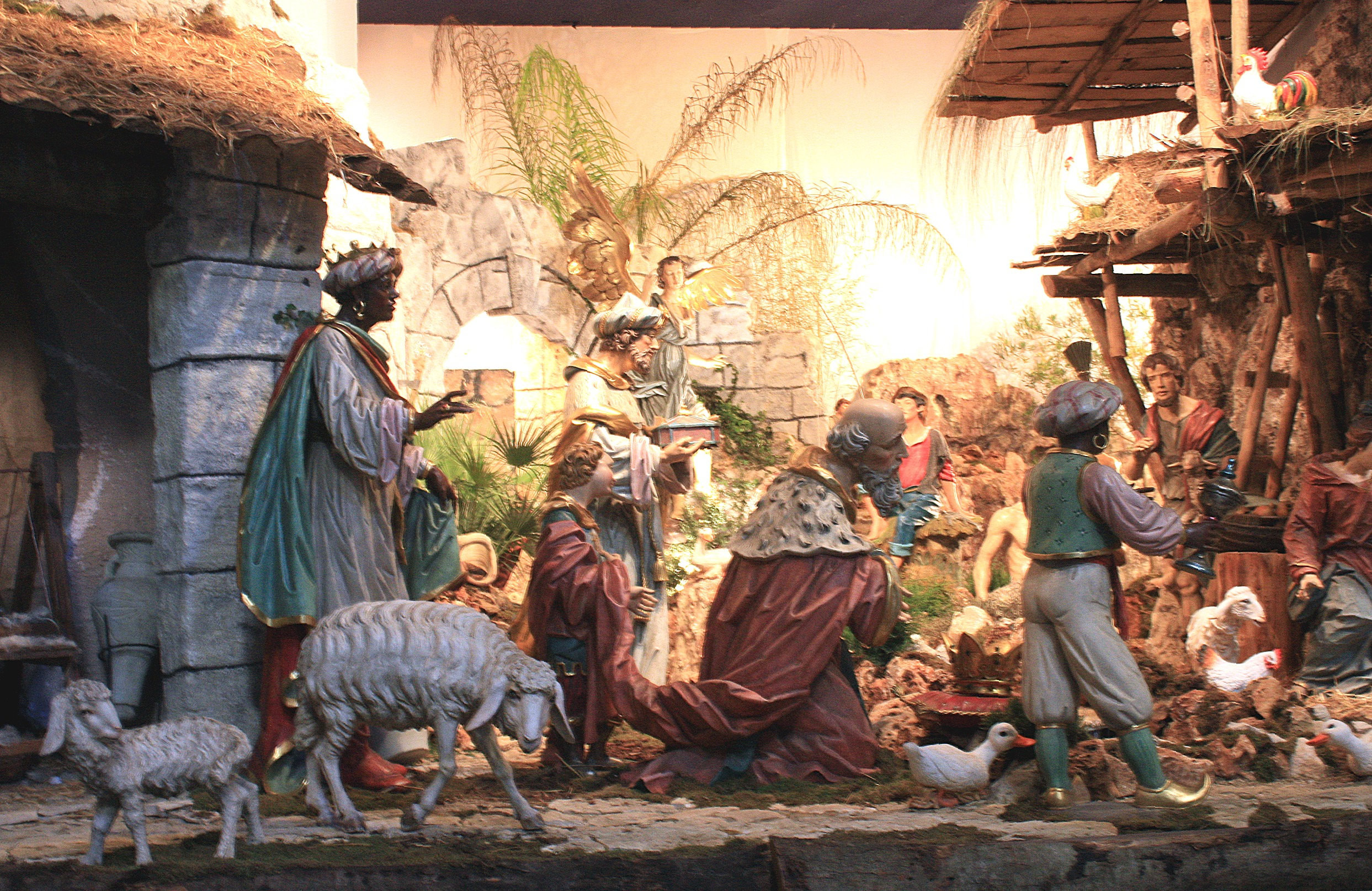
Christmas crib inside the Saint Peter's Basilica, Vatican

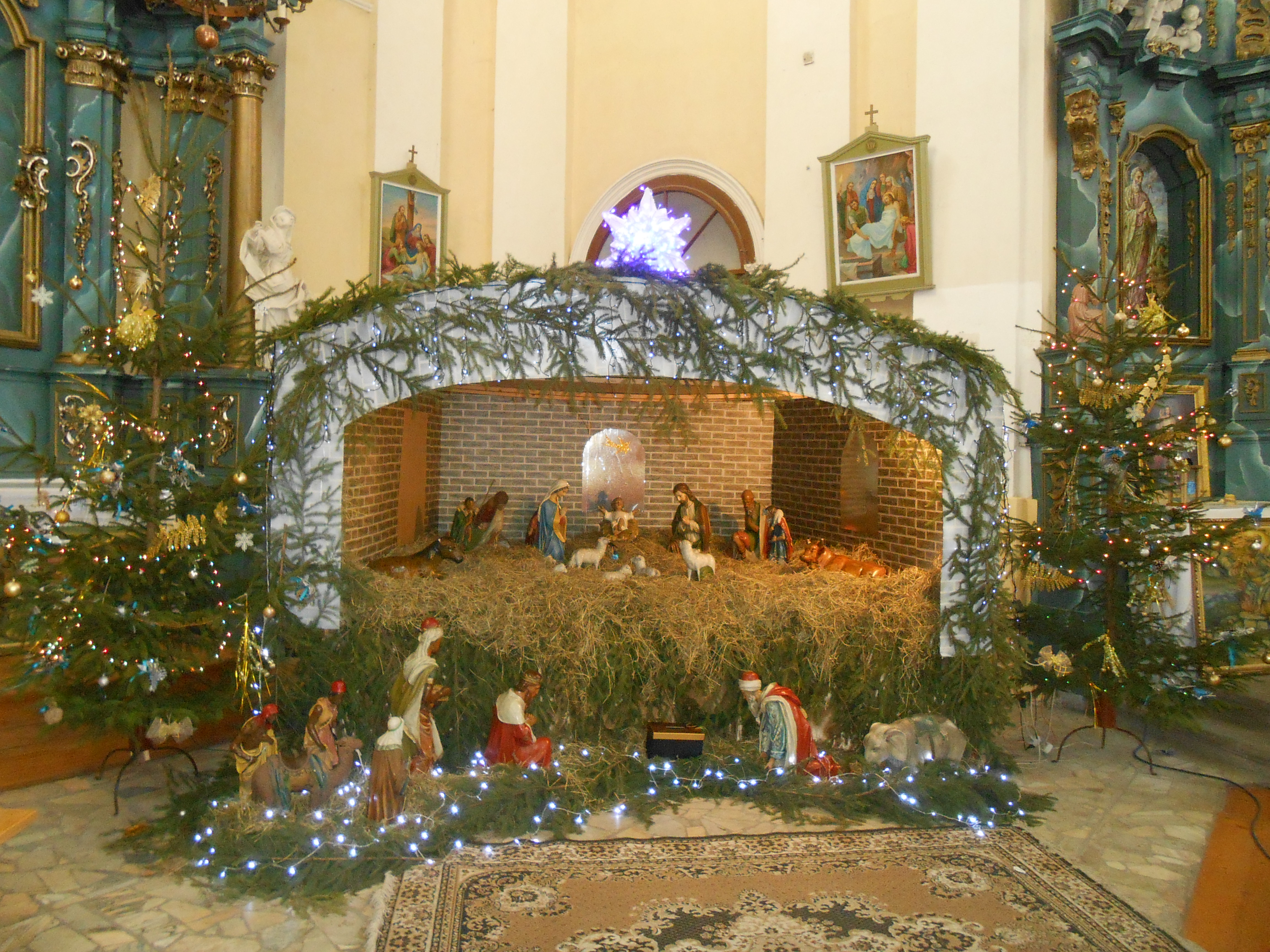
Nativity scene in Buchach, Ukraine

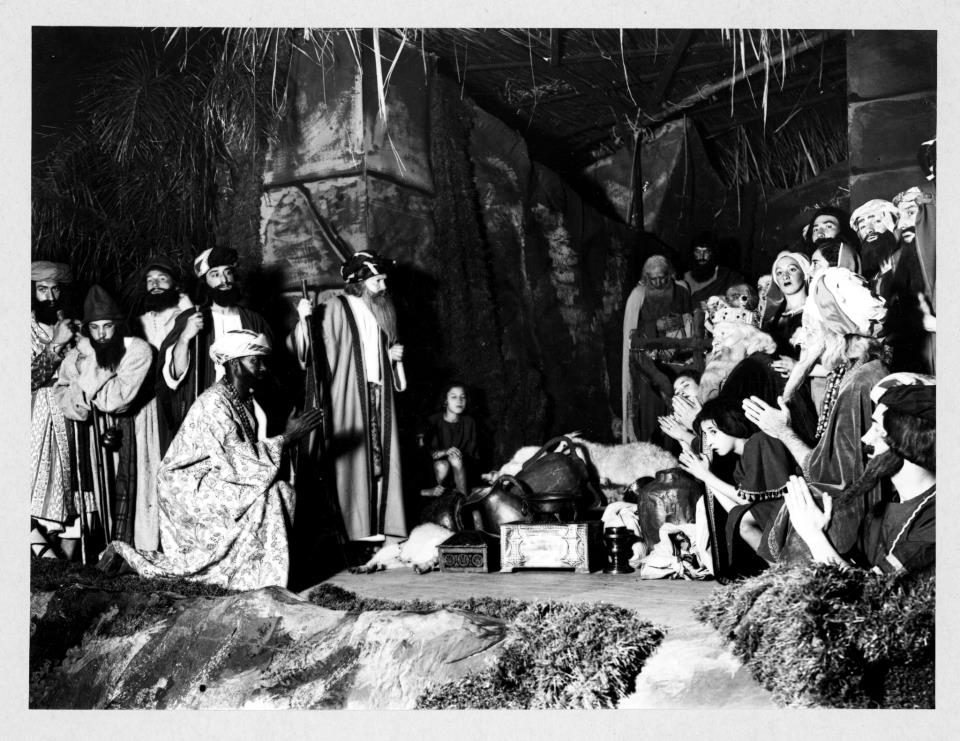
Nativity scene in Buenos Aires (1924)

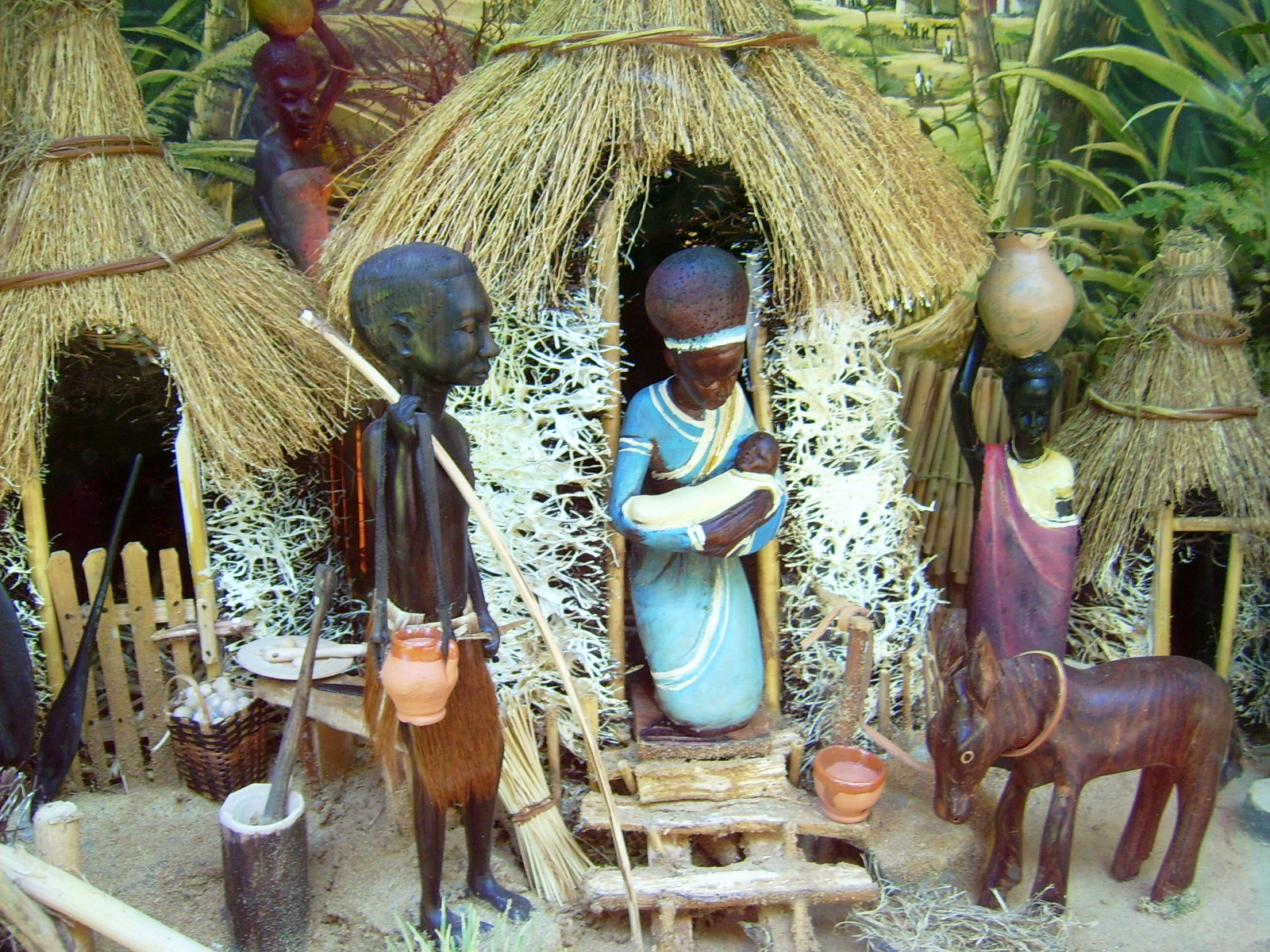
Nativity scene in St. Wendel

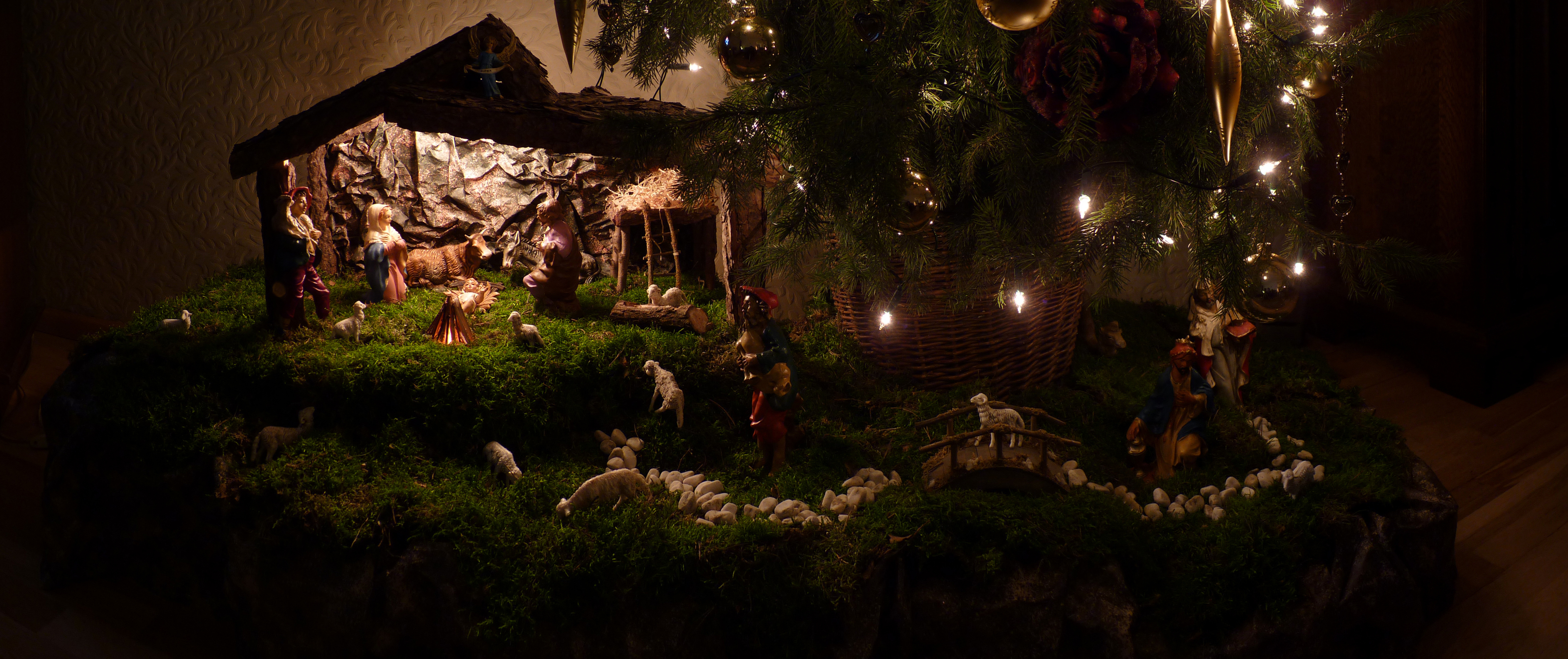
Nativity scene in the Netherlands

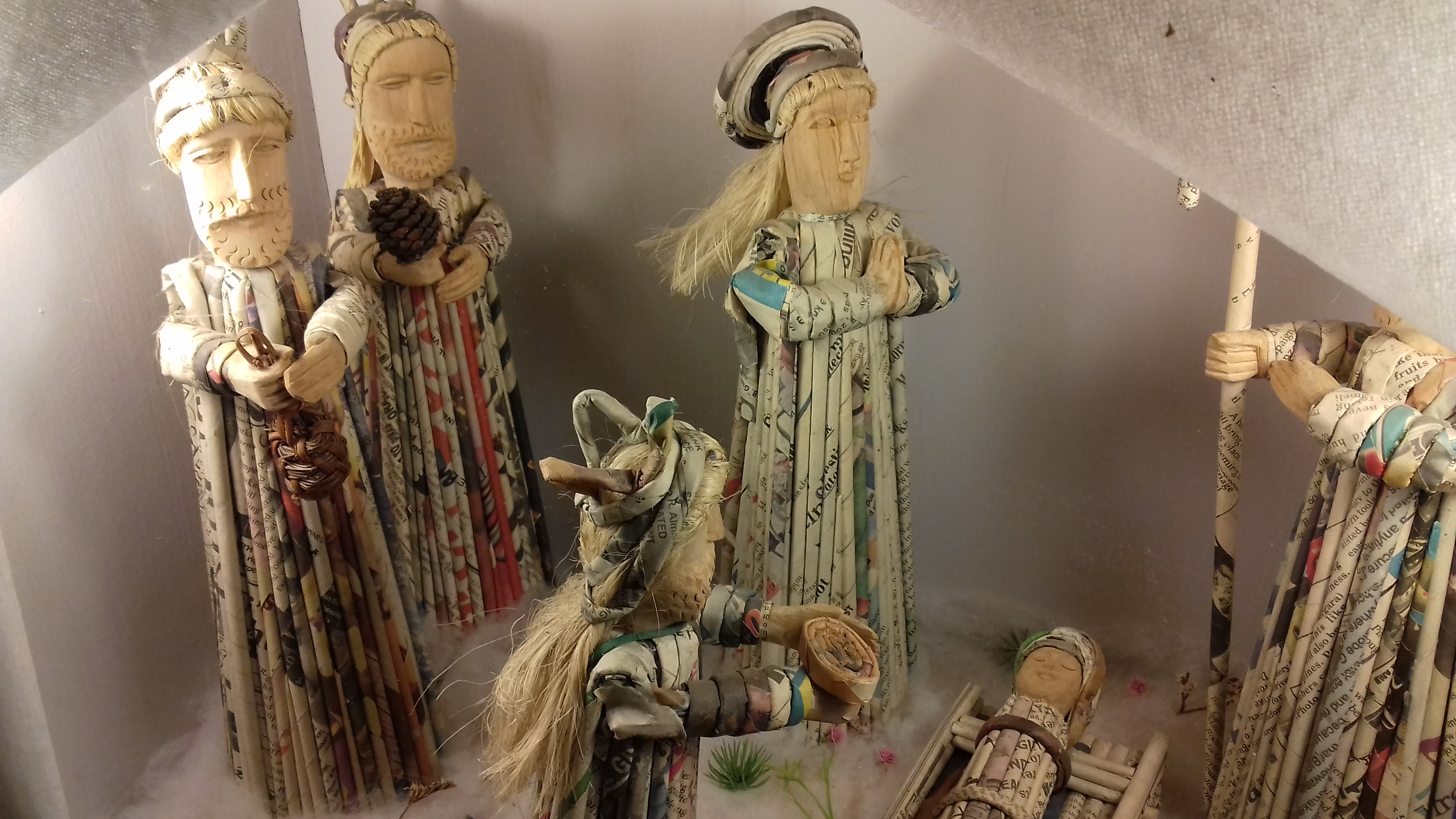
Christmas crib

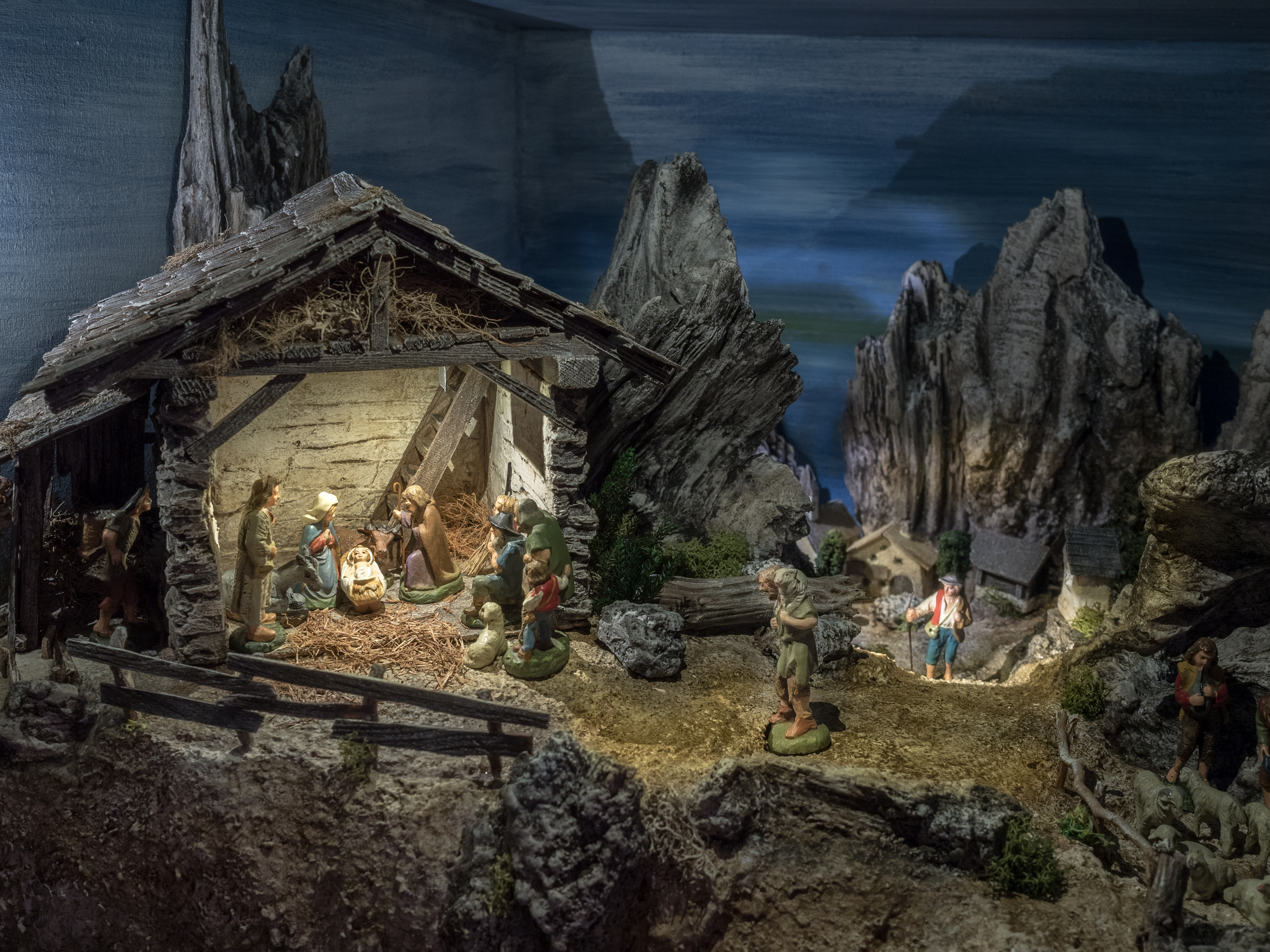
Crib family with shepherds at the crib exhibition in Bamberg 2015

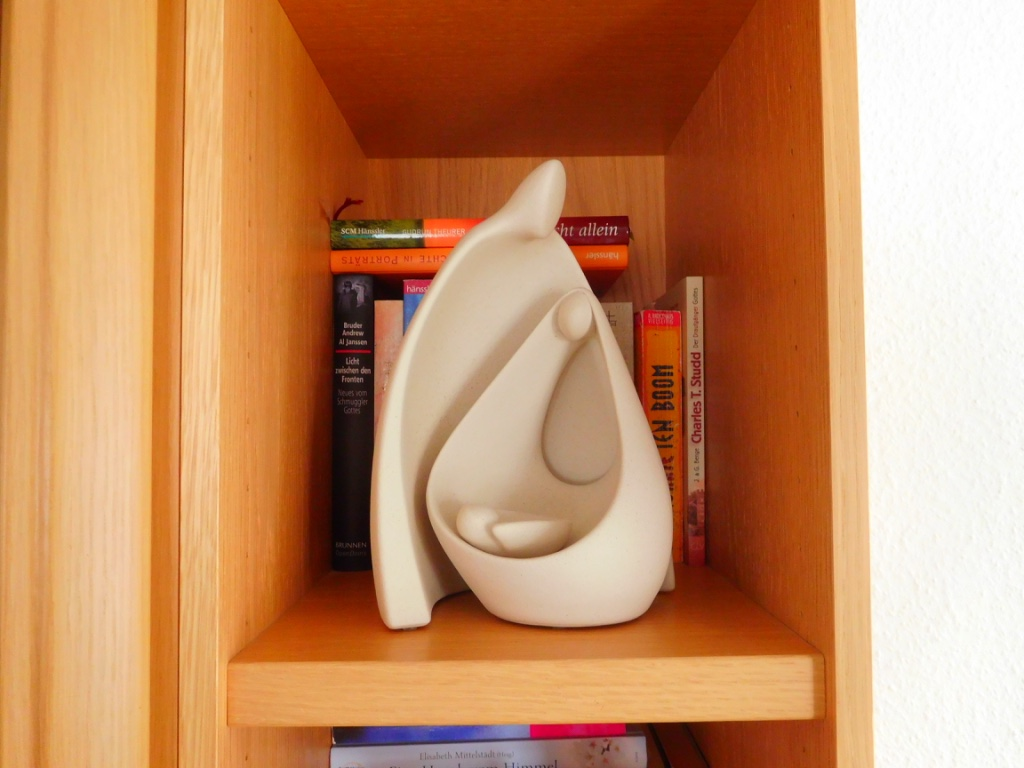
Abstract nativity display in a home.

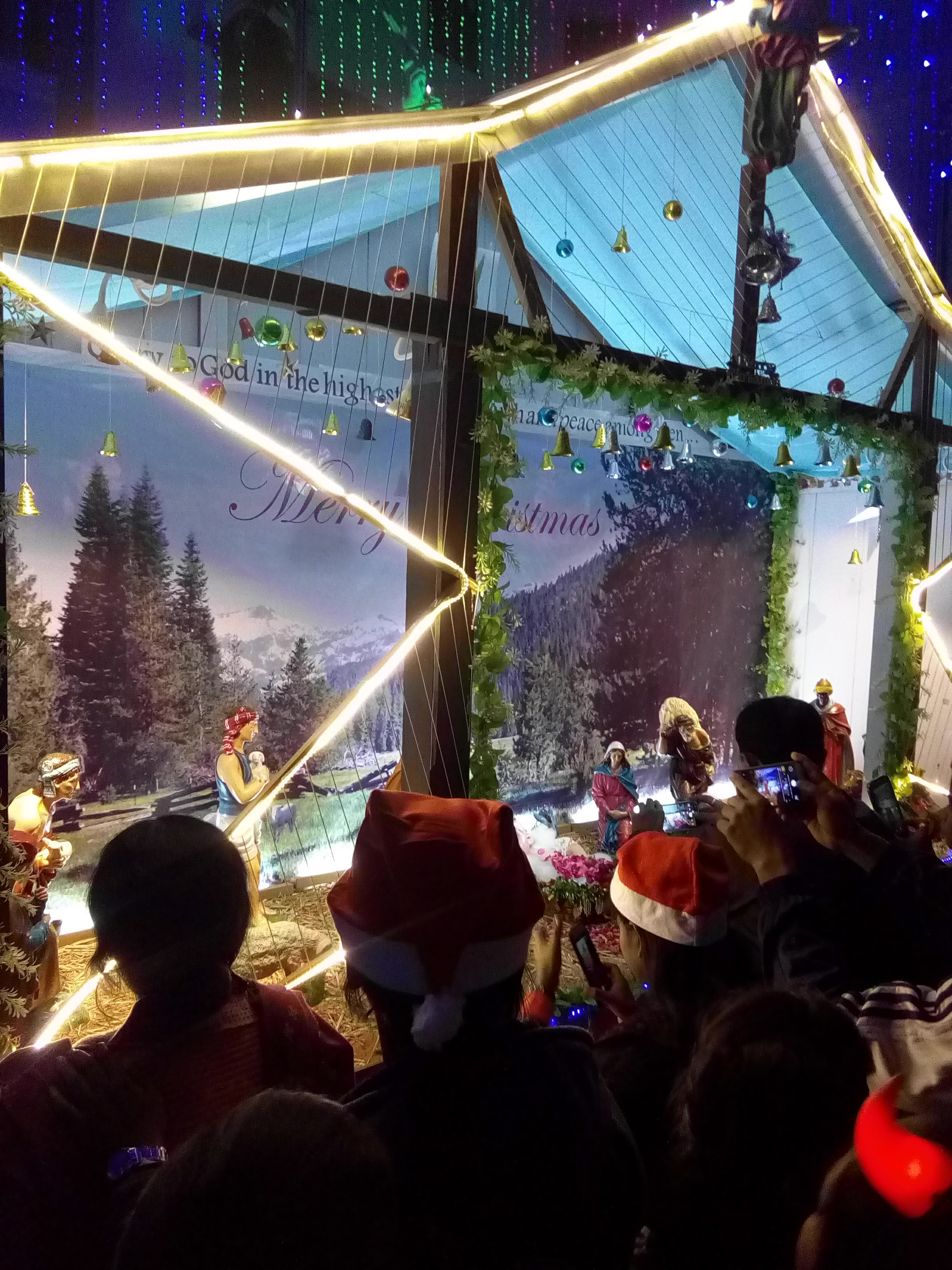
Nativity display at the St. Xavier's Church of St. Xavier's College, Kolkata.

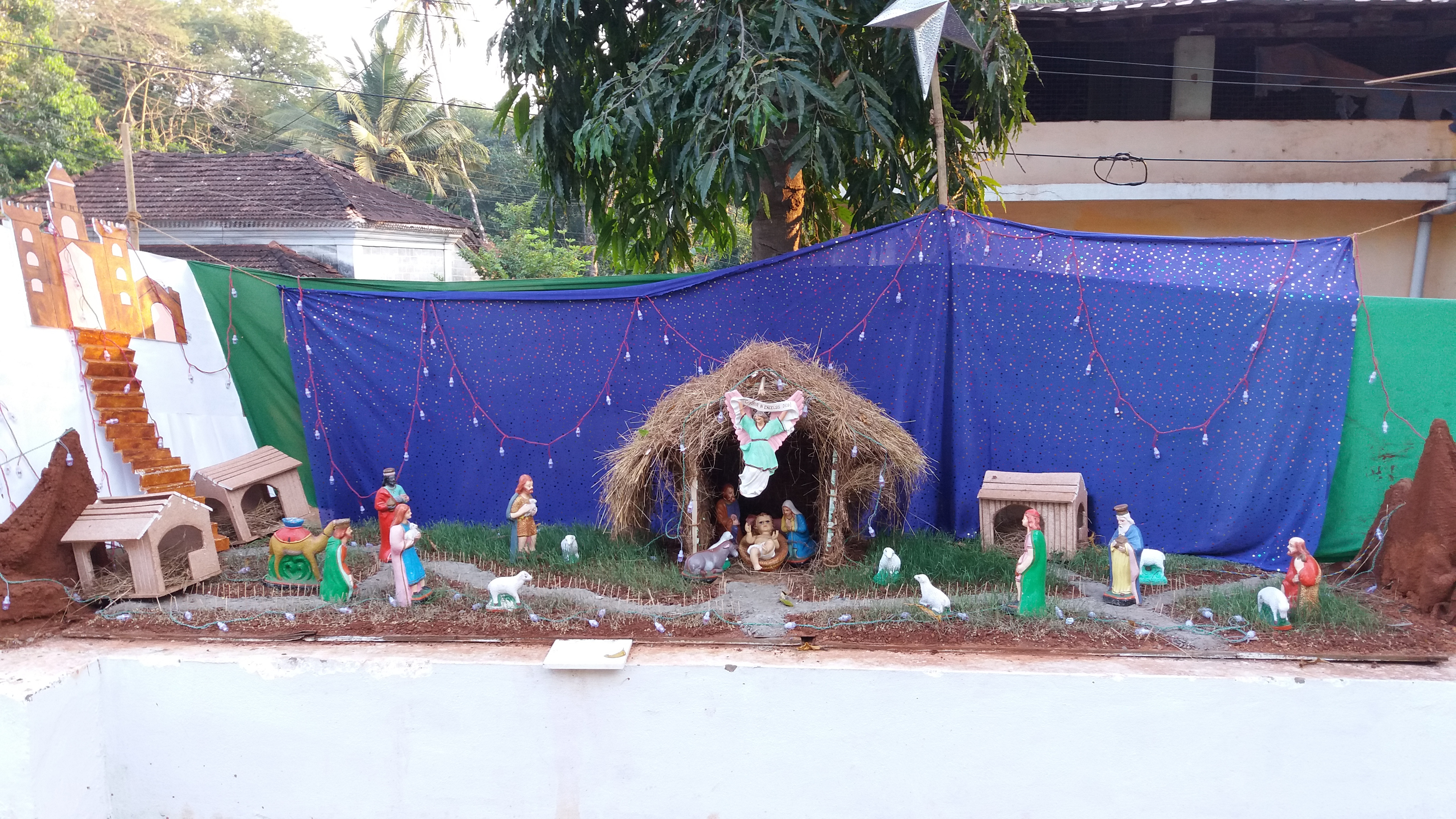
Christmas crib outside a Catholic church Goa, India

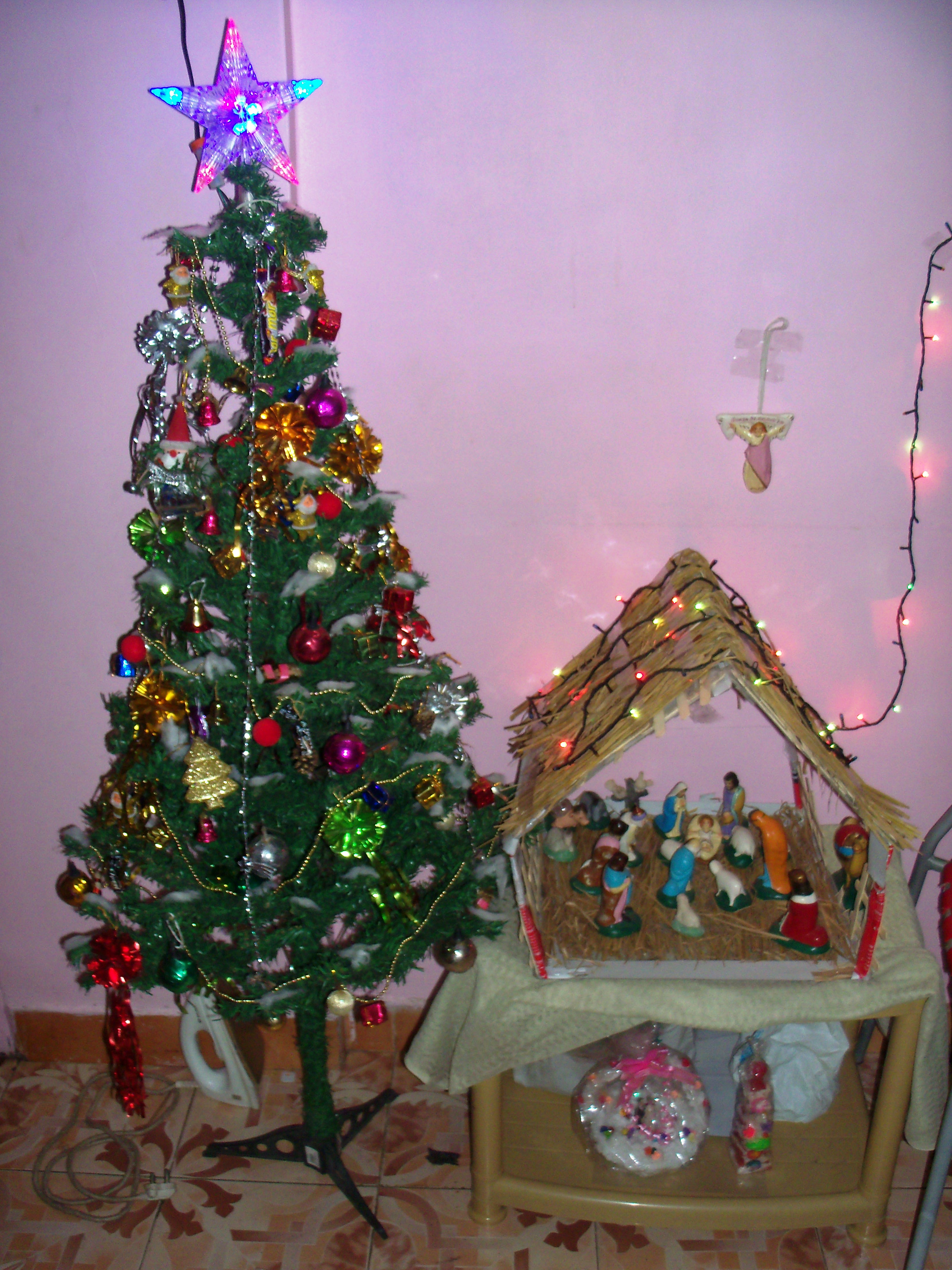
Christmas crib and tree display in House Mumbai, India.

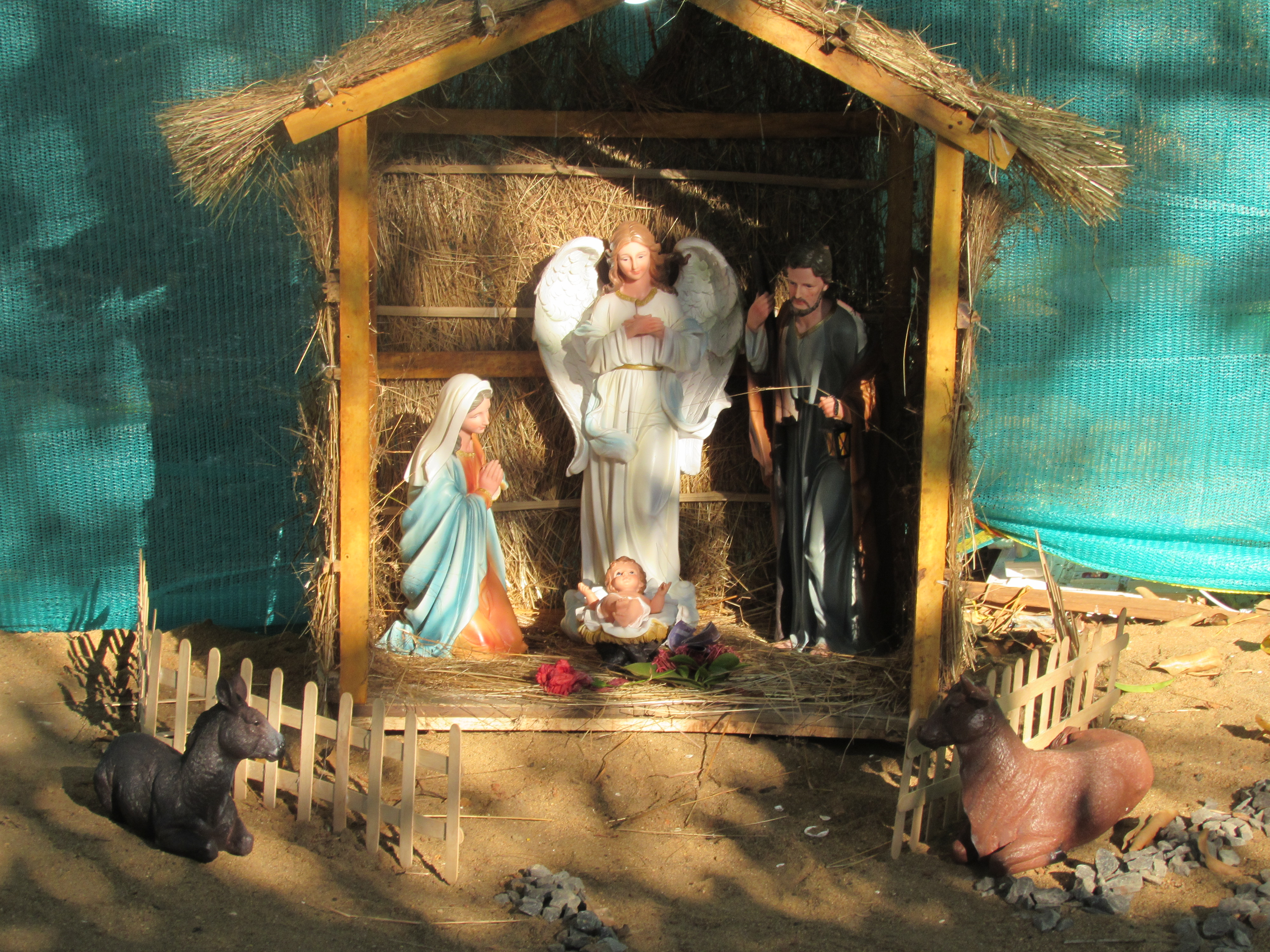
Close up of Outdoor Christmas Crib in Siolim, Goa, India December 2023

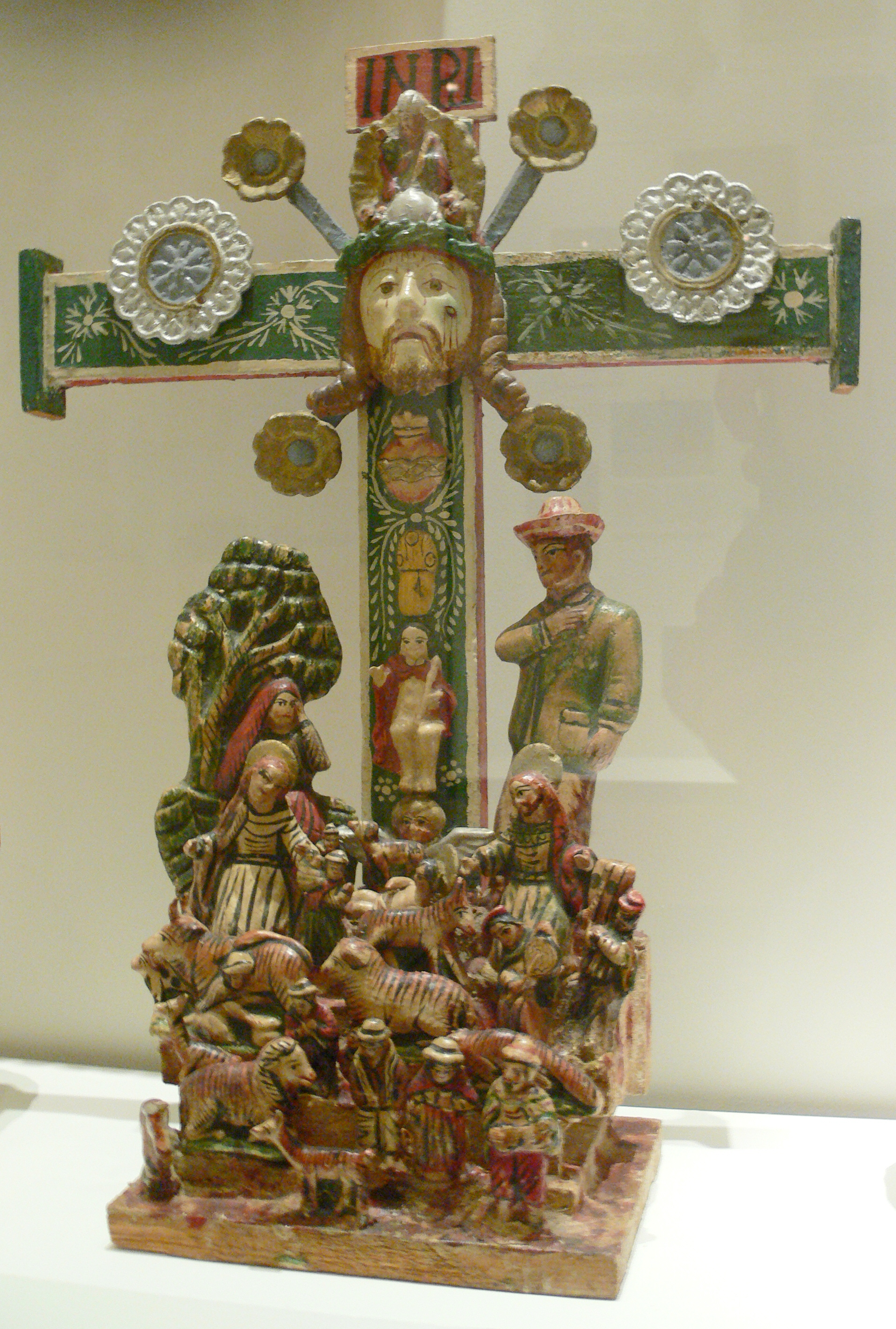
Peruvian crucifix with nativity scene at its base, c. 1960

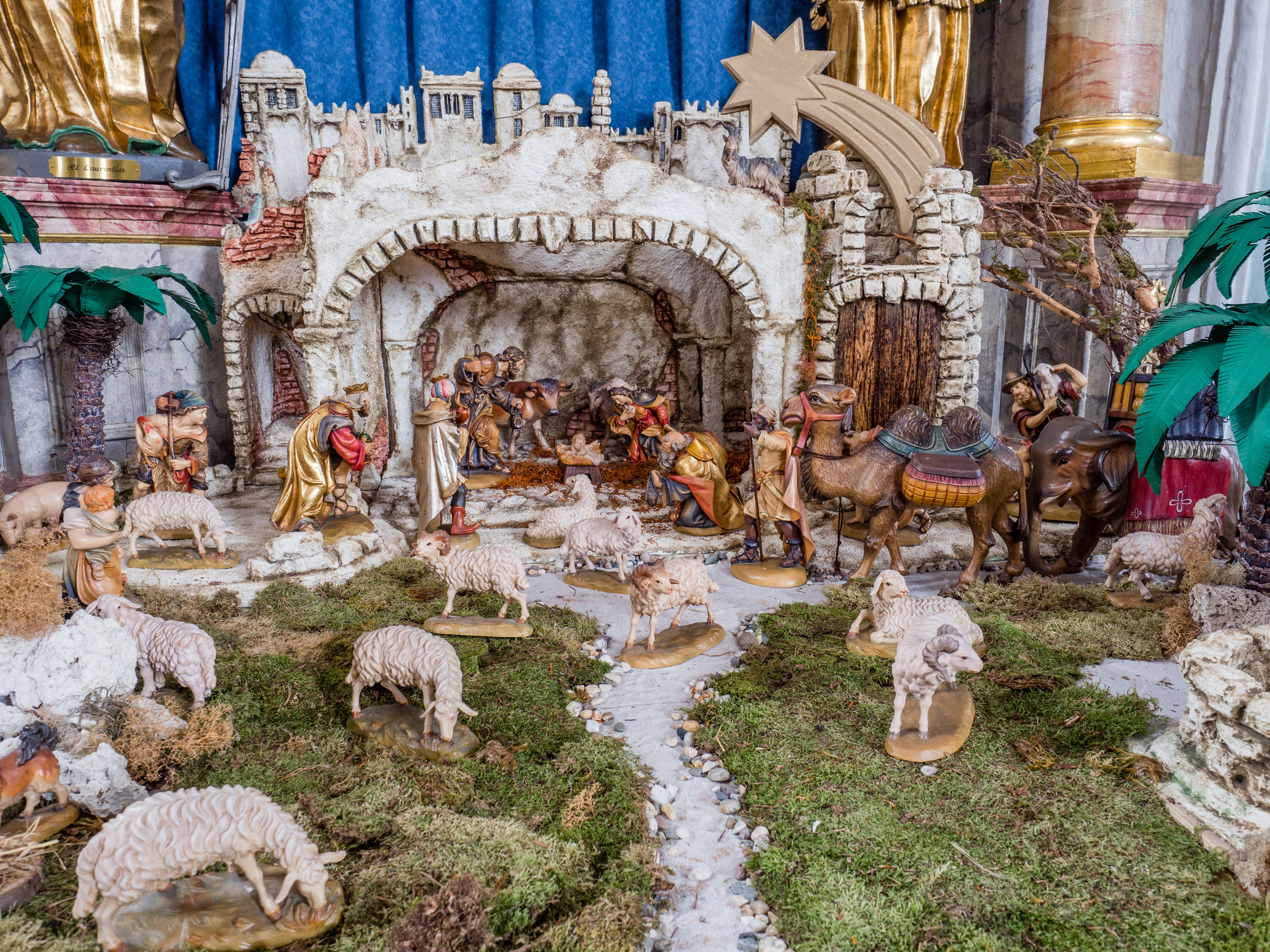
Christmas crib parish Church St. James in Ebing, Germany

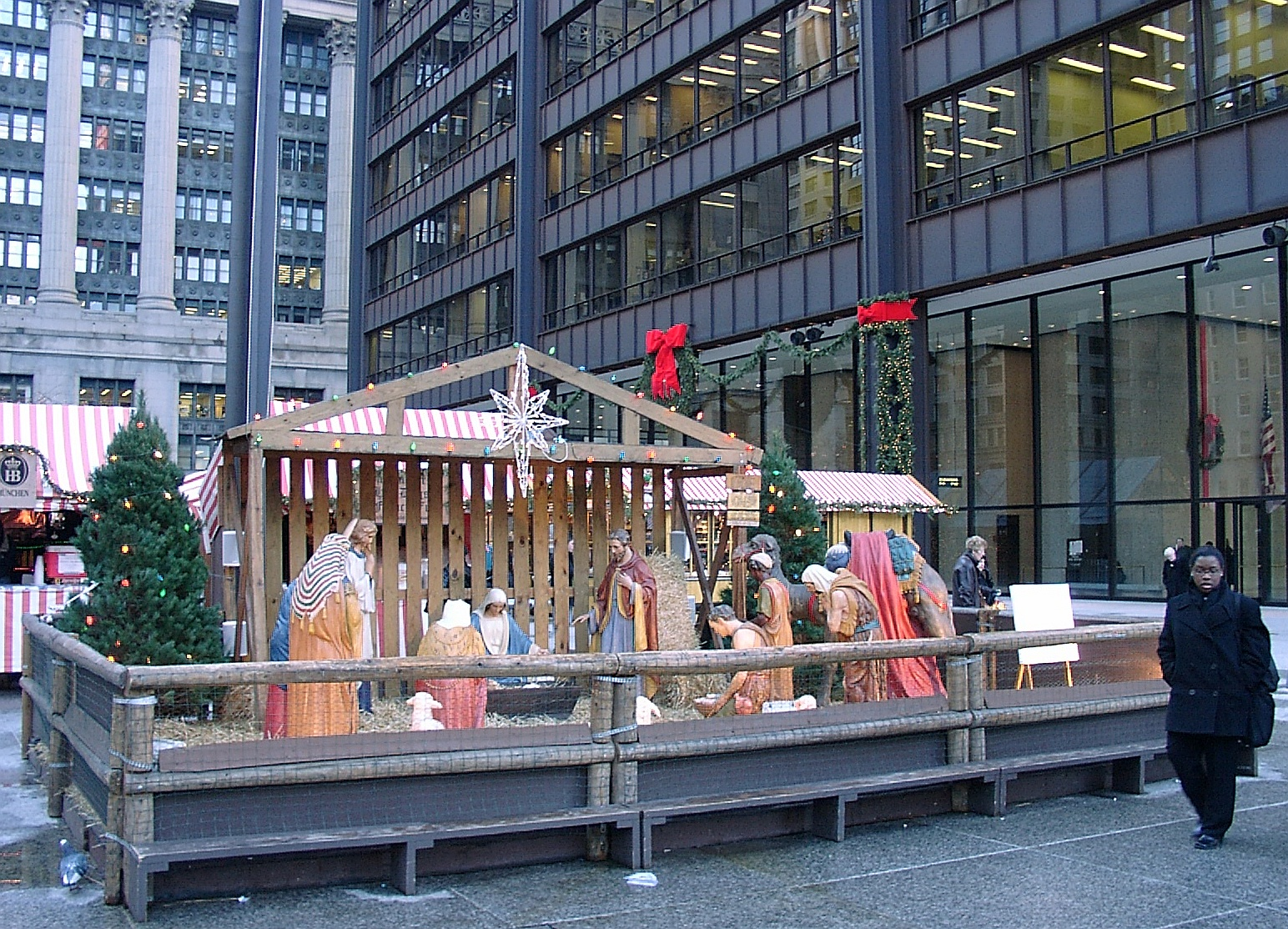
A static outdoor nativity scene in the United States, (Christkindlmarket, Chicago, Illinois)

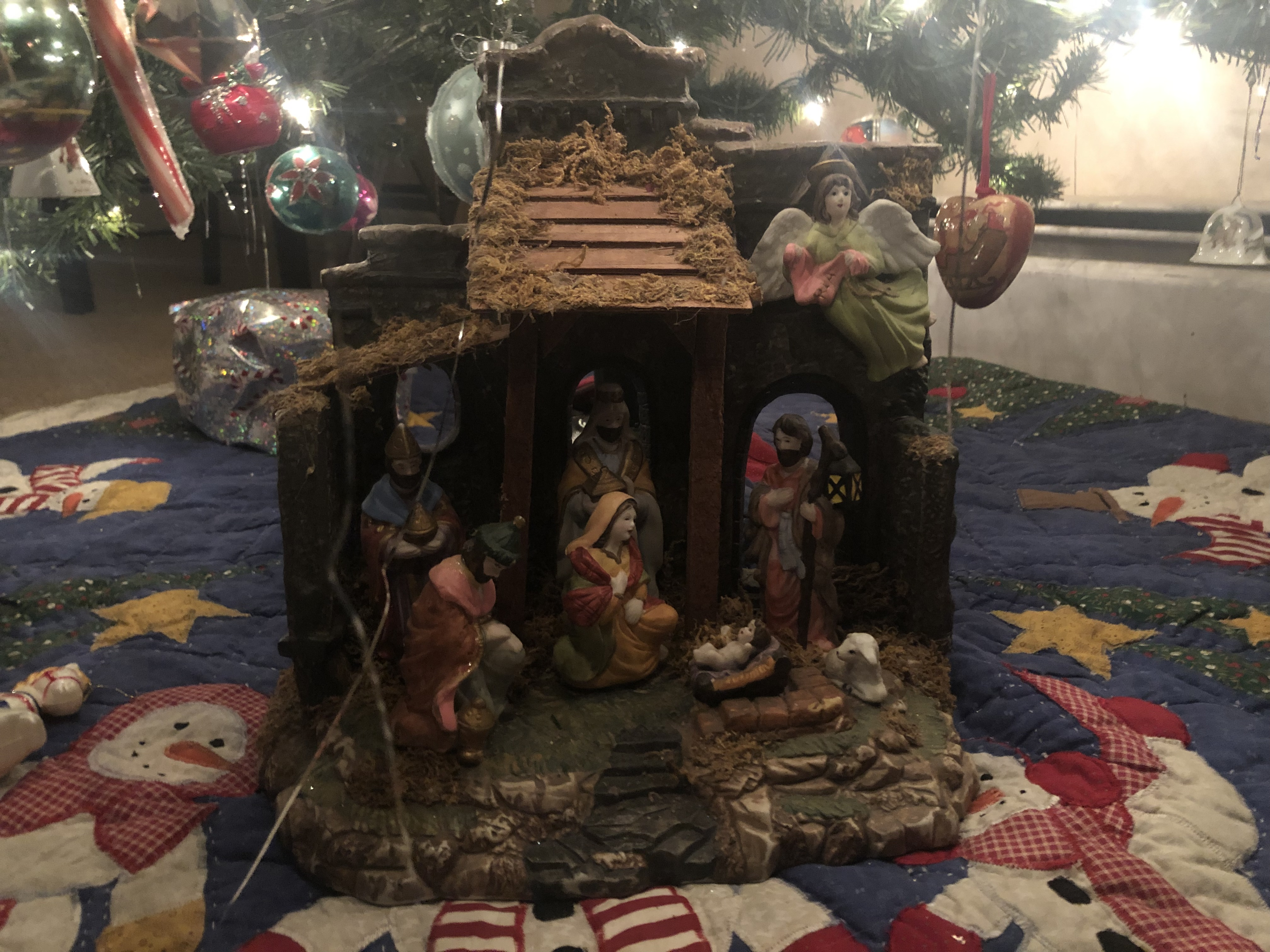
A nativity scene inside an American home.

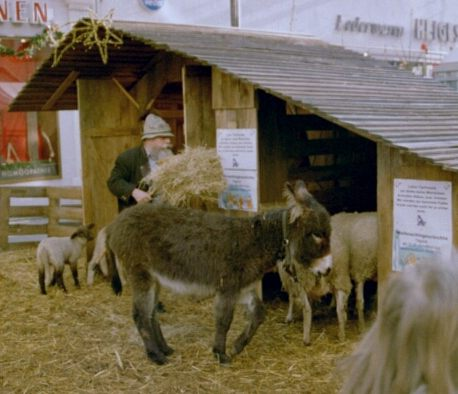
Living scene in Germany

== See also ==
- Weihnachtsberg – a traditional Christmas mountain scene that combines the nativity scene with mining motifs
