= Neapolitan nativity scene =

Representation of the birth of Jesus

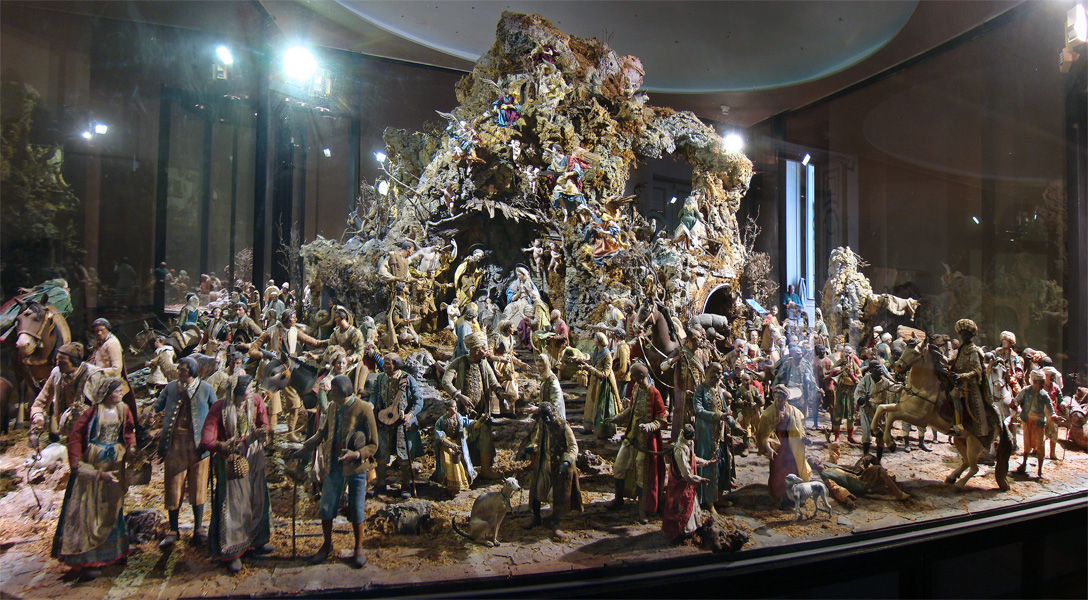
The Neapolitan nativity scene of the Royal Palace of Caserta.

The Neapolitan nativity scene or presepe is a representation of the birth of Jesus traditionally set in Naples in the eighteenth century.

The Neapolitan crib art has remained unchanged for centuries, becoming part of the most consolidated and followed Christmas traditions of the city. Famous in Naples, in fact, is the well-known via dei presepi (via San Gregorio Armeno) which offers a showcase of all the local crafts concerning the nativity scene. Moreover, there are numerous city and non-city museums (such as the museum of San Martino or the Royal Palace of Caserta) in which historical pieces or entire scenes set during the birth of Jesus are exhibited.
