= Merry Christmas bill =

2013 Texas bill

H.B. No. 308, also known as the Merry Christmas bill, is a Texas bill that was signed into law by Gov. Rick Perry on June 14, 2013. The law states that:

WINTER CELEBRATIONS. 
(a)  A school district may educate students about the history of traditional winter celebrations, and allow students and district staff to offer traditional greetings regarding the celebrations, including:
  (1)  "Merry Christmas";
  (2)  "Happy Hanukkah"; and
  (3)  "happy holidays."
(b)  Except as provided by Subsection (c), a school district may display on school property scenes or symbols associated with traditional winter celebrations, including a menorah or a Christmas image such as a nativity scene or Christmas tree, if the display includes a scene or symbol of:
  (1)  more than one religion; or
  (2)  one religion and at least one secular scene or symbol.
(c)  A display relating to a traditional winter celebration may not include a message that encourages adherence to a particular religious belief.[2]

== Criticism ==
Victor Cornell of the American Civil Liberties Union has criticized the bill, asserting that the U.S. Supreme Court has prohibited religious practice being endorsed by schools unless it has a "secular instructional purpose",
