= Litohošť =

- Municipality
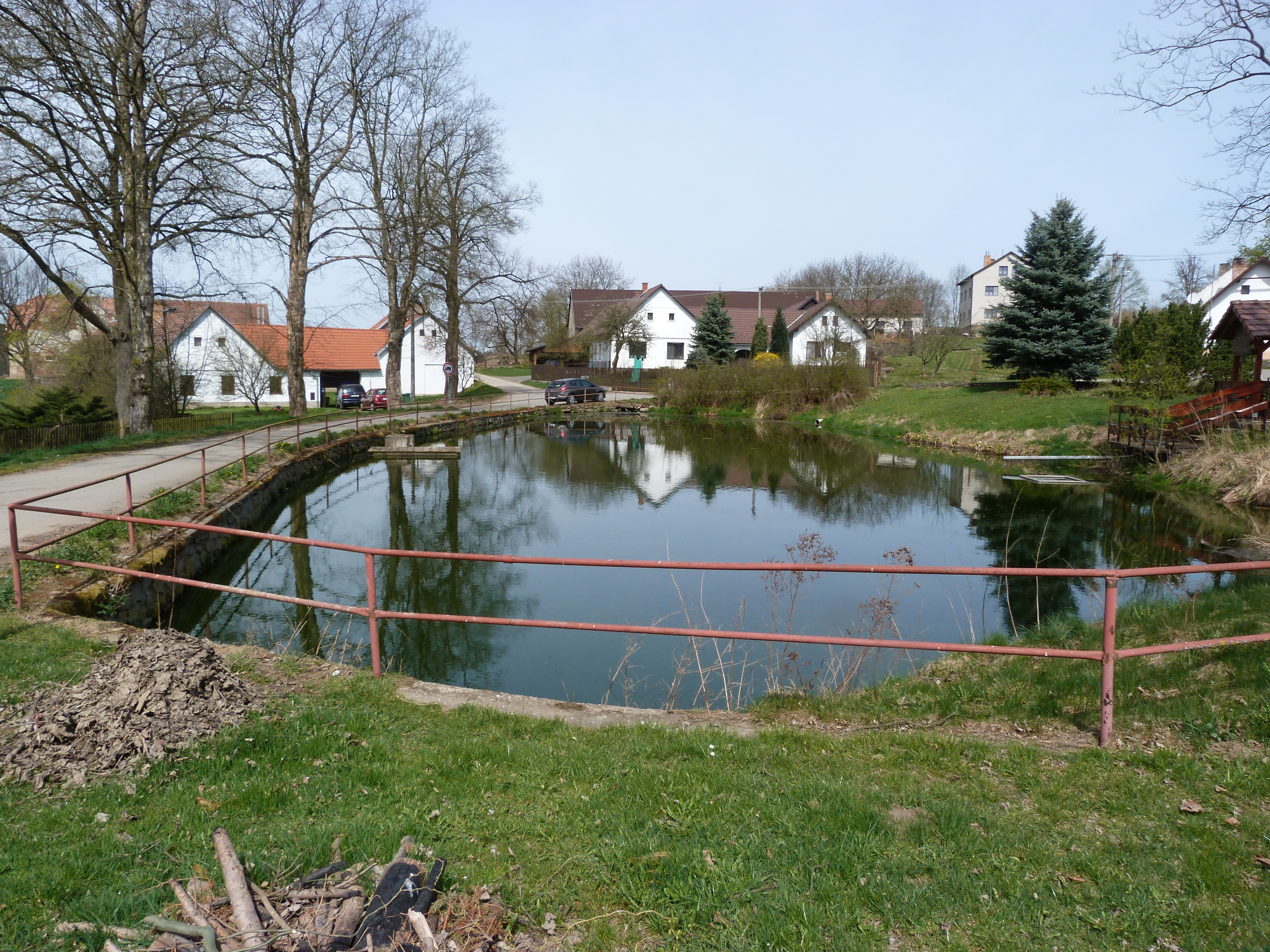
- Water reservoir

- Location in the Czech Republic
- Coordinates: 49°26′59″N 15°5′28″E
- Country: Czech Republic
- Region: Vysočina
- District: Pelhřimov
- First mentioned: 1558

Area
  - Total: 3.50 km^{2} (1.35 sq mi)
- Elevation: 565 m (1,854 ft)

Population (2026-01-01)
  - Total: 85
  - Density: 24/km^{2} (63/sq mi)
- Time zone: UTC+1 (CET)
  - Summer (DST): UTC+2 (CEST)
- Postal code: 395 01
- Website: www.litohost.cz

Litohošť is a municipality and village in Pelhřimov District in the Vysočina Region of the Czech Republic. It has about 90 inhabitants.

Litohošť lies approximately 10 kilometres (6 mi) west of Pelhřimov, 37 km (23 mi) west of Jihlava, and 86 km (53 mi) south-east of Prague.

== Demographics ==
Historical population
Year	Pop.	±%
1869	189	—
1880	241	+27.5%
1890	219	−9.1%
1900	202	−7.8%
1910	204	+1.0%
1921	203	−0.5%
1930	176	−13.3%
1950	104	−40.9%
1961	95	−8.7%
1970	83	−12.6%
1980	88	+6.0%
1991	80	−9.1%
2001	51	−36.3%
2011	65	+27.5%
2021	68	+4.6%
Source: Censuses
