= Polesí =

- Municipality
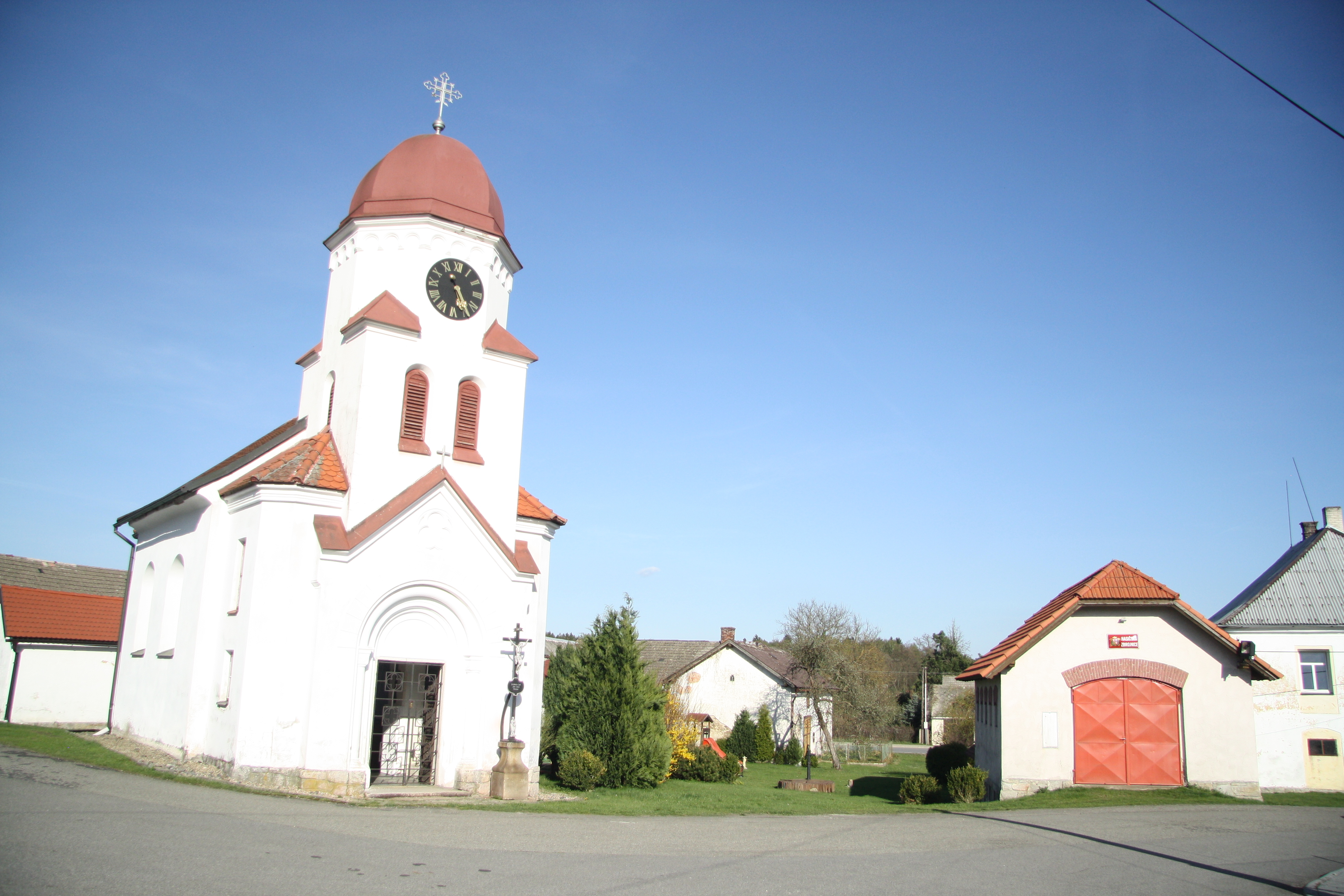
- Chapel of Saint John of Nepomuk

- Location in the Czech Republic
- Coordinates: 49°17′35″N 15°14′47″E
- Country: Czech Republic
- Region: Vysočina
- District: Pelhřimov
- First mentioned: 1457

Area
  - Total: 4.70 km^{2} (1.81 sq mi)
- Elevation: 662 m (2,172 ft)

Population (2026-01-01)
  - Total: 113
  - Density: 24.0/km^{2} (62.3/sq mi)
- Time zone: UTC+1 (CET)
  - Summer (DST): UTC+2 (CEST)
- Postal code: 394 64
- Website: www.obecpolesi.cz

Polesí is a municipality and village in Pelhřimov District in the Vysočina Region of the Czech Republic. It has about 100 inhabitants.

Polesí lies approximately 16 kilometres (10 mi) south of Pelhřimov, 28 km (17 mi) south-west of Jihlava, and 107 km (66 mi) south-east of Prague.

== Demographics ==
Historical population
Year	Pop.	±%
1869	270	—
1880	268	−0.7%
1890	300	+11.9%
1900	307	+2.3%
1910	270	−12.1%
1921	274	+1.5%
1930	260	−5.1%
1950	190	−26.9%
1961	174	−8.4%
1970	153	−12.1%
1980	135	−11.8%
1991	104	−23.0%
2001	85	−18.3%
2011	85	+0.0%
2021	98	+15.3%
Source: Censuses
