= Pelhřimov District =

Pelhřimov District Okres Pelhřimov
- District
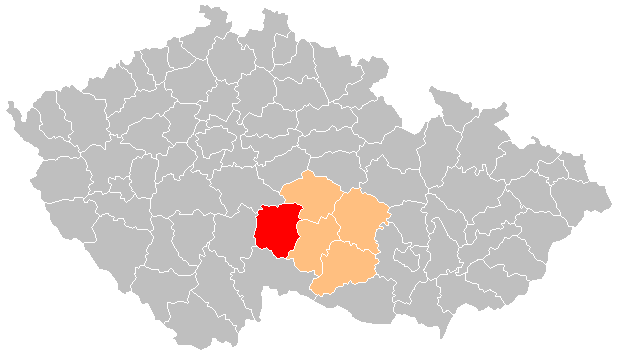
- Location in the Vysočina Region within the Czech Republic
- Coordinates: 49°26′N 15°10′E
- Country: Czech Republic
- Region: Vysočina
- Capital: Pelhřimov

Area
  - Total: 1,290.35 km^{2} (498.21 sq mi)

Population (2026)
  - Total: 74,205
  - Density: 57.508/km^{2} (148.94/sq mi)
- Time zone: UTC+1 (CET)
  - Summer (DST): UTC+2 (CEST)
- Municipalities: 120
- * Towns: 9
- * Market towns: 4

Pelhřimov District (Czech: okres Pelhřimov) is a district in the Vysočina Region of the Czech Republic. Its capital is the town of Pelhřimov.

== Administrative division ==
Pelhřimov District is divided into three administrative districts of municipalities with extended competence: Pelhřimov, Humpolec and Pacov.

=== List of municipalities ===
Towns are marked in bold and market towns in italics:

Arneštovice - Bácovice - Bělá - Bohdalín - Bořetice - Bořetín - Božejov - Bratřice - Budíkov - Buřenice - Bystrá - Čáslavsko - Častrov - Čejov - Čelistná - Černov - Černovice - Červená Řečice - Cetoraz - Chýstovice - Chyšná - Čížkov - Dehtáře - Dobrá Voda - Dobrá Voda u Pacova - Dubovice - Důl - Eš - Hojanovice - Hojovice - Horní Cerekev - Horní Rápotice - Horní Ves - Hořepník - Hořice - Humpolec - Jankov - Ježov - Jiřice - Kaliště - Kámen - Kamenice nad Lipou - Kejžlice - Koberovice - Kojčice - Komorovice - Košetice - Krasíkovice - Křeč - Křelovice - Křešín - Leskovice - Lesná - Lhota-Vlasenice - Libkova Voda - Lidmaň - Litohošť - Lukavec - Martinice u Onšova - Mezilesí - Mezná - Mladé Bříště - Mnich - Moraveč - Mysletín - Nová Buková - Nová Cerekev - Nový Rychnov - Obrataň - Olešná - Ondřejov - Onšov - Pacov - Pavlov - Pelhřimov - Píšť - Počátky - Polesí - Pošná - Proseč - Proseč pod Křemešníkem - Putimov - Řečice - Rodinov - Rovná - Rynárec - Salačova Lhota - Samšín - Sedlice - Senožaty - Staré Bříště - Stojčín - Střítež - Střítež pod Křemešníkem - Svépravice - Syrov - Těchobuz - Těmice - Ústrašín - Útěchovice - Útěchovice pod Stražištěm - Útěchovičky - Včelnička - Velká Chyška - Velký Rybník - Veselá - Věžná - Vojslavice - Vokov - Vyklantice - Vyskytná - Vysoká Lhota - Vystrkov - Zachotín - Zajíčkov - Želiv - Zhořec - Žirov - Žirovnice - Zlátenka

== Geography ==
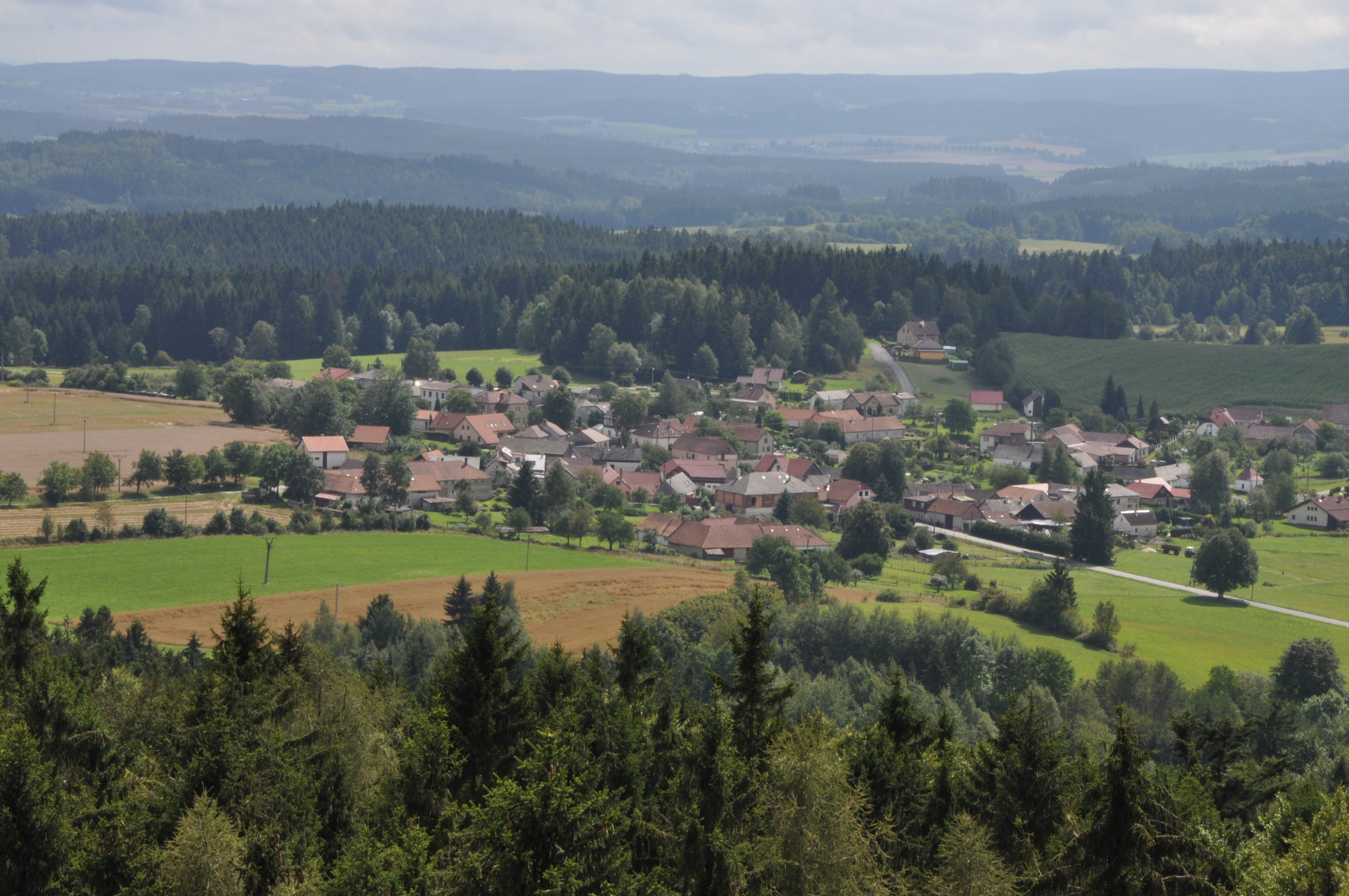
View from Křemešník to the south

The landscape is very rugged, with an average altitude mostly between 550 and 600 m. The climate of the district is harsh and cold for most of the year. Almost the entire territory lies in the geomorphological mesoregion of Křemešník Highlands, only a small part in the southeast belongs into the Křižanov Highlands. The highest point of the district is the hill Křemešník in Nový Rychnov with an elevation of 769 m (2,523 ft), the lowest point is the river bed of the Želivka in Želiv at 380 m (1,250 ft).

From the total district area of 1,290.4 km^{2} (498.2 sq mi), agricultural land occupies 780.7 km^{2} (301.4 sq mi), forests occupy 392.6 km^{2} (151.6 sq mi), and water area occupies 23.0 km^{2} (8.9 sq mi). Forests cover 30.4% of the district's area.

There are only small rivers. The most important river is the Želivka, which originates here and flows to the north, and its tributary, the Trnava. In the south flows the Kamenice, a tributary of the Nežárka. The southernmost part of the Švihov Reservoir (one of the largest reservoirs in the country built on the Želivka) is located in the northern part of the district. A notable body of water in the district is also Trnávka Reservoir.

There are no protected landscape areas, only small-scale protected areas.

== Demographics ==
Historical population

| Year | Pop. | ±% |
|---|---|---|
| 1869 | 99,331 | — |
| 1880 | 100,980 | +1.7% |
| 1890 | 101,345 | +0.4% |
| 1900 | 99,455 | −1.9% |
| 1910 | 100,702 | +1.3% |

| Year | Pop. | ±% |
|---|---|---|
| 1921 | 98,693 | −2.0% |
| 1930 | 90,990 | −7.8% |
| 1950 | 74,597 | −18.0% |
| 1961 | 75,805 | +1.6% |
| 1970 | 74,450 | −1.8% |

| Year | Pop. | ±% |
|---|---|---|
| 1980 | 76,058 | +2.2% |
| 1991 | 74,614 | −1.9% |
| 2001 | 72,984 | −2.2% |
| 2011 | 71,914 | −1.5% |
| 2021 | 70,785 | −1.6% |

Source: Censuses

=== Most populous municipalities ===
| Name | Population | Area (km^{2}) |
|---|---|---|
| Pelhřimov | 16,233 | 95 |
| Humpolec | 11,487 | 52 |
| Pacov | 4,757 | 36 |
| Kamenice nad Lipou | 3,687 | 32 |
| Žirovnice | 3,135 | 44 |
| Počátky | 2,452 | 31 |
| Horní Cerekev | 1,872 | 32 |
| Černovice | 1,782 | 37 |
| Nová Cerekev | 1,196 | 35 |
| Želiv | 1,142 | 26 |

== Economy ==
The largest employers with headquarters in Pelhřimov District and at least 500 employees are:

| Economic entity | Location | Number of employees | Main activity |
|---|---|---|---|
| Agrostroj Pelhřimov | Pelhřimov | 1,500–1,999 | Manufacture of agricultural machinery |
| Pelhřimov Hospital | Pelhřimov | 500–999 | Health care |

== Transport ==
The D1 motorway from Prague to Brno passes through the northern part of the district.

== Sights ==
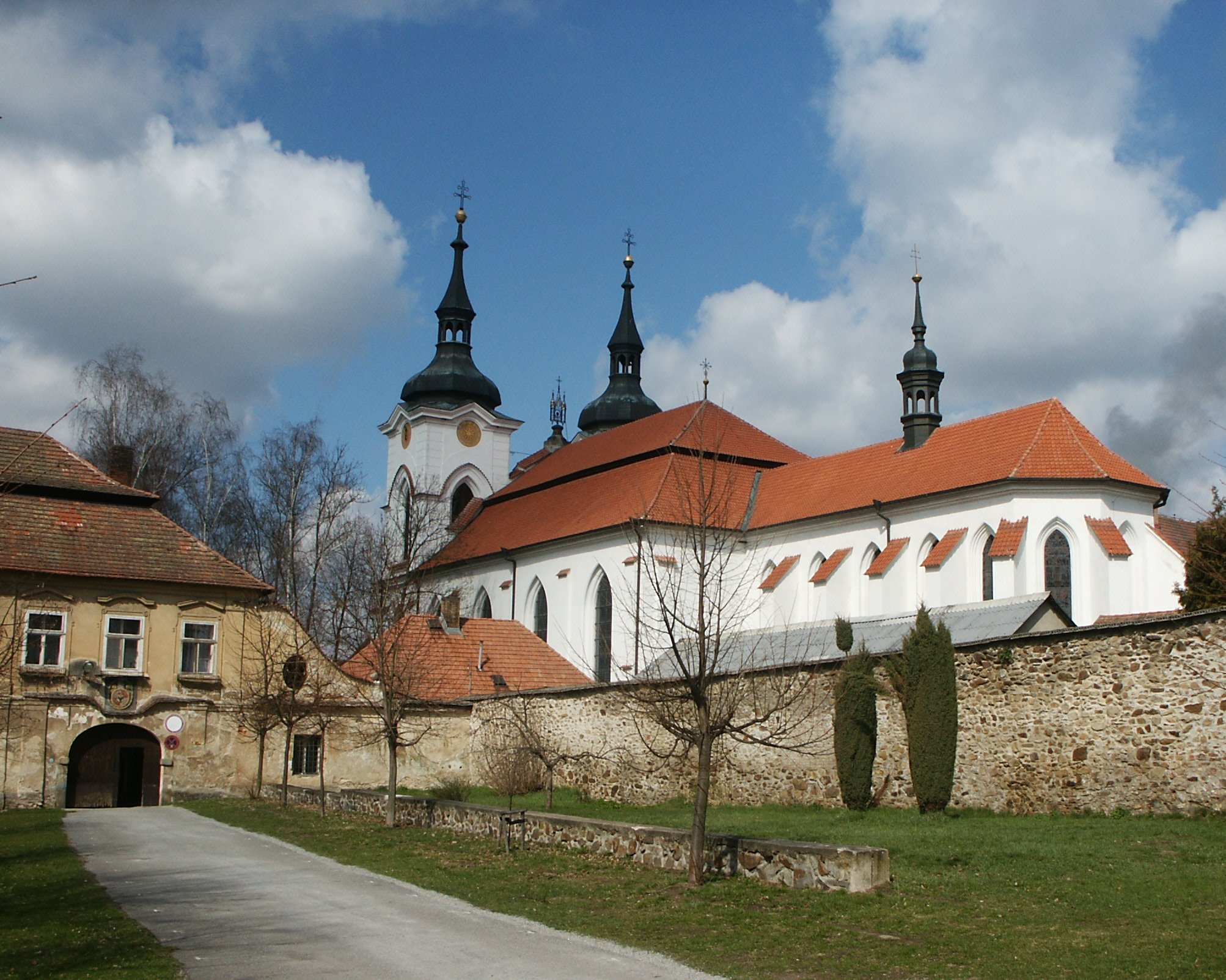
Želiv Monastery

The most important monuments in the district, protected as national cultural monuments, are:

- Želiv Monastery
- Červená Řečice Castle

The best-preserved settlements, protected as monument reservations and monument zones, are:

- Pelhřimov (monument reservation)
- Červená Řečice
- Kamenice nad Lipou
- Pacov
- Počátky
- Zhoř

The most visited tourist destinations are the Želiv Monastery and Museum of Records and Curiosities in Pelhřimov.
