= Hojanovice =

- Municipality
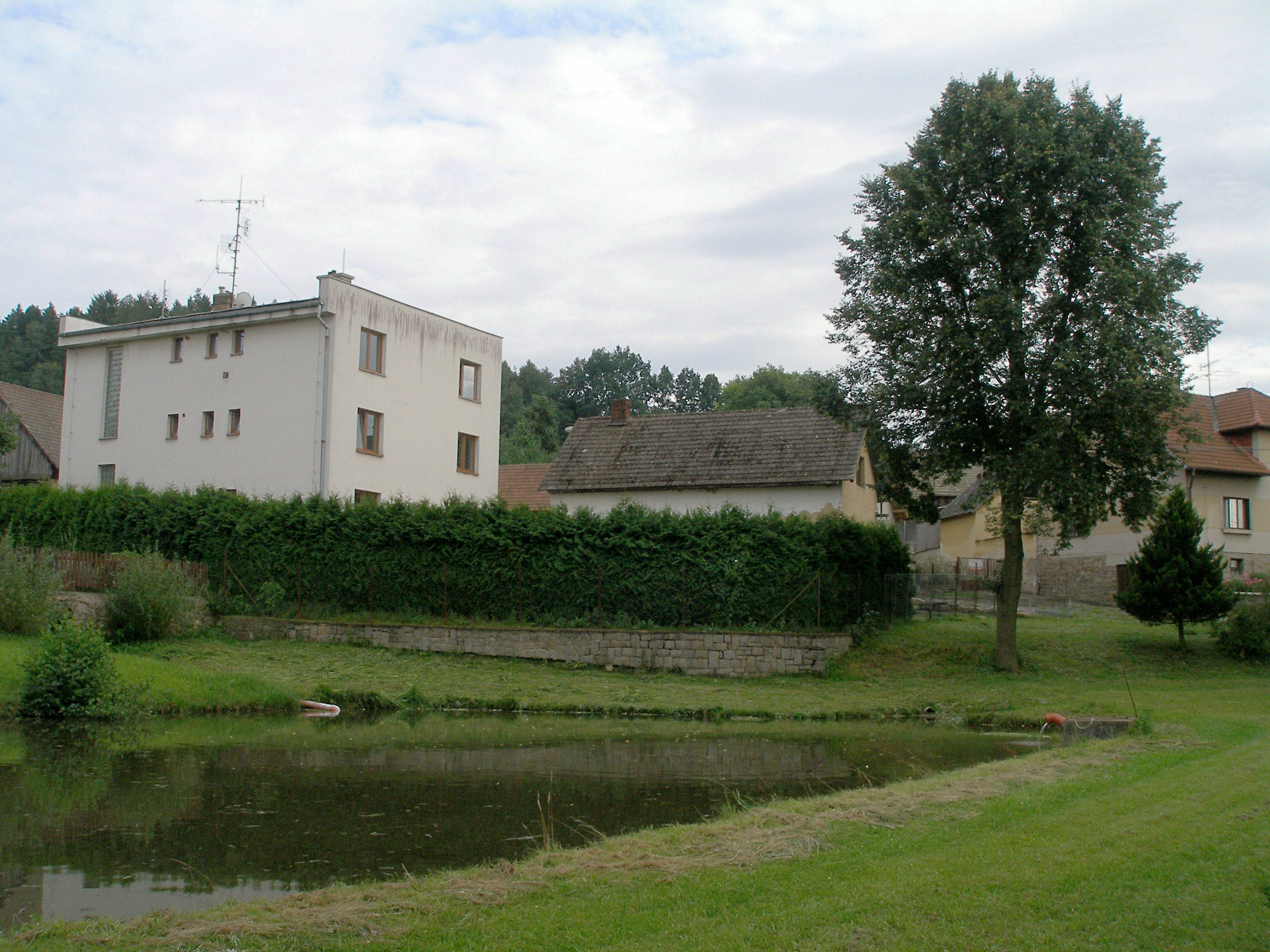
- Centre of Hojanovice

- Location in the Czech Republic
- Coordinates: 49°35′50″N 15°15′56″E
- Country: Czech Republic
- Region: Vysočina
- District: Pelhřimov
- First mentioned: 1318

Area
  - Total: 2.90 km^{2} (1.12 sq mi)
- Elevation: 466 m (1,529 ft)

Population (2026-01-01)
  - Total: 108
  - Density: 37.2/km^{2} (96.5/sq mi)
- Time zone: UTC+1 (CET)
  - Summer (DST): UTC+2 (CEST)
- Postal code: 396 01
- Website: hojanovice.cz

Hojanovice is a municipality and village in Pelhřimov District in the Vysočina Region of the Czech Republic. It has about 100 inhabitants.

Hojanovice lies approximately 20 kilometres (12 mi) north of Pelhřimov, 34 km (21 mi) north-west of Jihlava, and 81 km (50 mi) south-east of Prague.

== Demographics ==
Historical population
Year	Pop.	±%
1869	218	—
1880	271	+24.3%
1890	249	−8.1%
1900	245	−1.6%
1910	231	−5.7%
1921	227	−1.7%
1930	200	−11.9%
1950	166	−17.0%
1961	163	−1.8%
1970	160	−1.8%
1980	121	−24.4%
1991	102	−15.7%
2001	97	−4.9%
2011	97	+0.0%
2021	109	+12.4%
Source: Censuses
