= Černov =

- Municipality
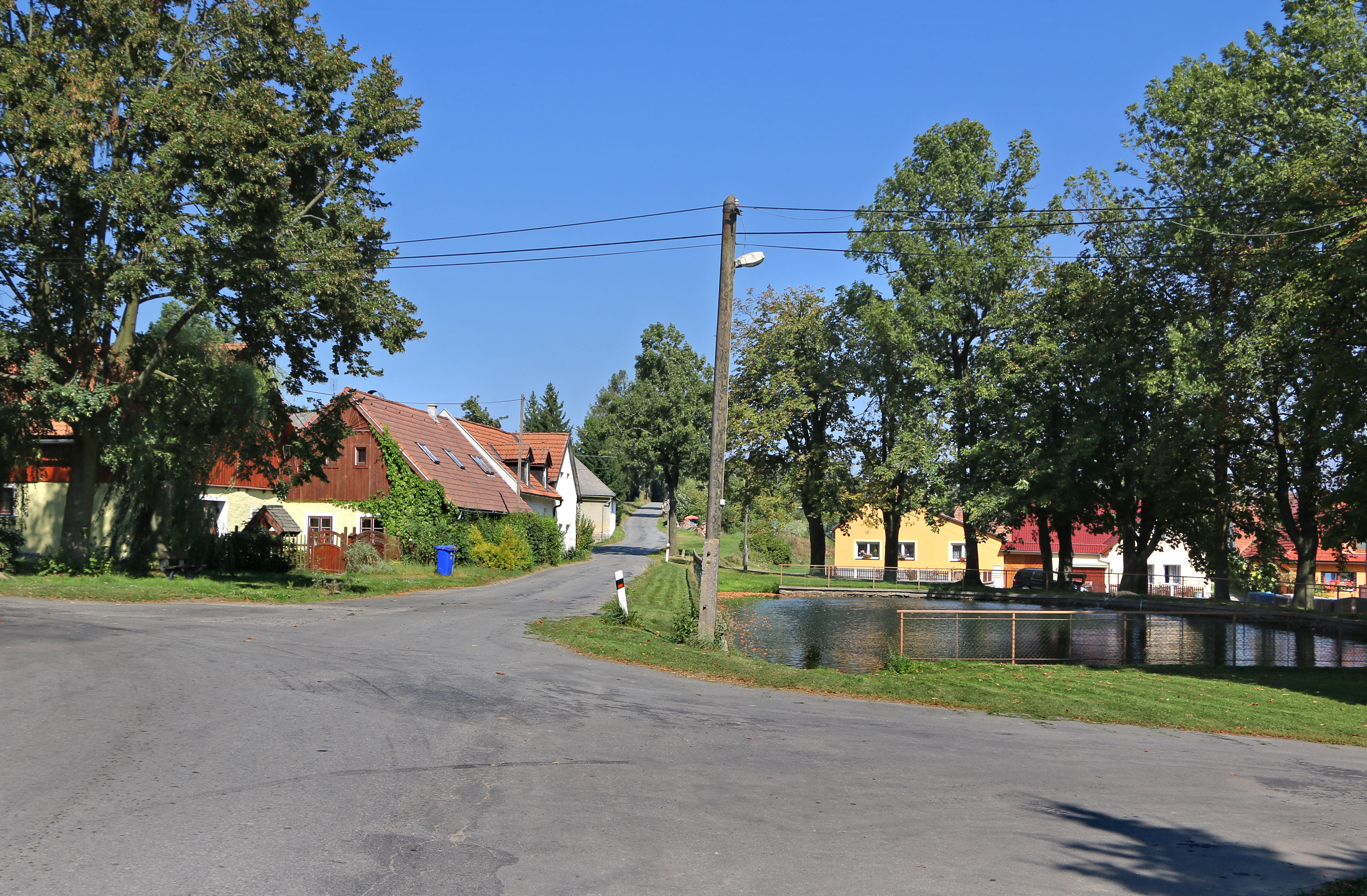
- Centre of Černov

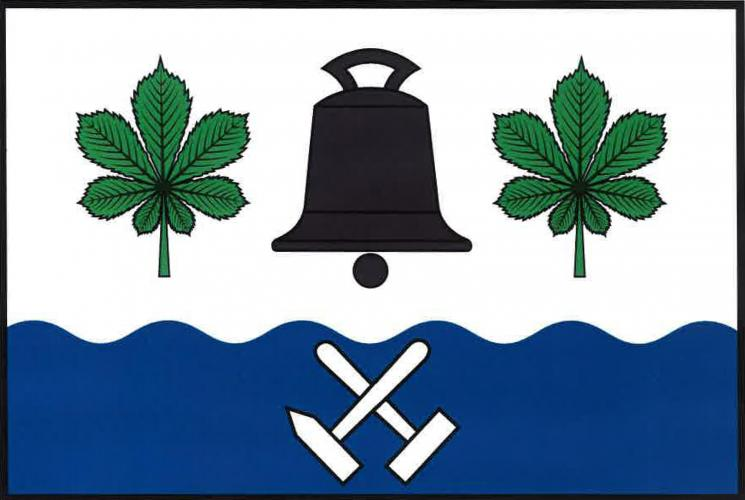
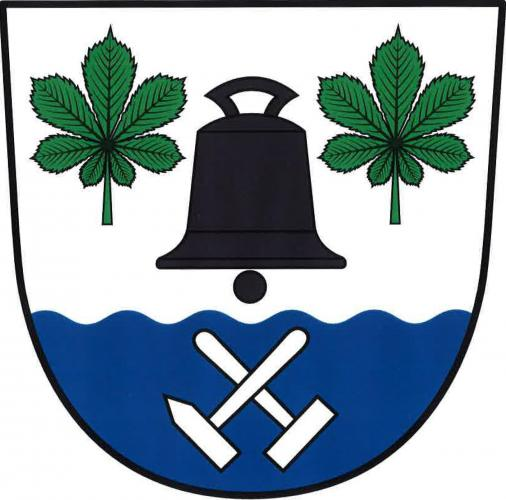
- Flag Coat of arms

- Location in the Czech Republic
- Coordinates: 49°20′38″N 15°18′51″E
- Country: Czech Republic
- Region: Vysočina
- District: Pelhřimov
- First mentioned: 1590

Area
  - Total: 2.61 km^{2} (1.01 sq mi)
- Elevation: 648 m (2,126 ft)

Population (2026-01-01)
  - Total: 141
  - Density: 54.0/km^{2} (140/sq mi)
- Time zone: UTC+1 (CET)
  - Summer (DST): UTC+2 (CEST)
- Postal code: 393 01
- Website: www.cernov.cz

Černov is a municipality and village in Pelhřimov District in the Vysočina Region of the Czech Republic. It has about 100 inhabitants.

Černov lies approximately 12 kilometres (7 mi) south-east of Pelhřimov, 21 km (13 mi) west of Jihlava, and 105 km (65 mi) south-east of Prague.

== Demographics ==
Historical population
Year	Pop.	±%
1869	221	—
1880	207	−6.3%
1890	207	+0.0%
1900	218	+5.3%
1910	218	+0.0%
1921	198	−9.2%
1930	181	−8.6%
1950	140	−22.7%
1961	149	+6.4%
1970	133	−10.7%
1980	124	−6.8%
1991	123	−0.8%
2001	115	−6.5%
2011	105	−8.7%
2021	120	+14.3%
Source: Censuses
