= Rodinov =

- Municipality
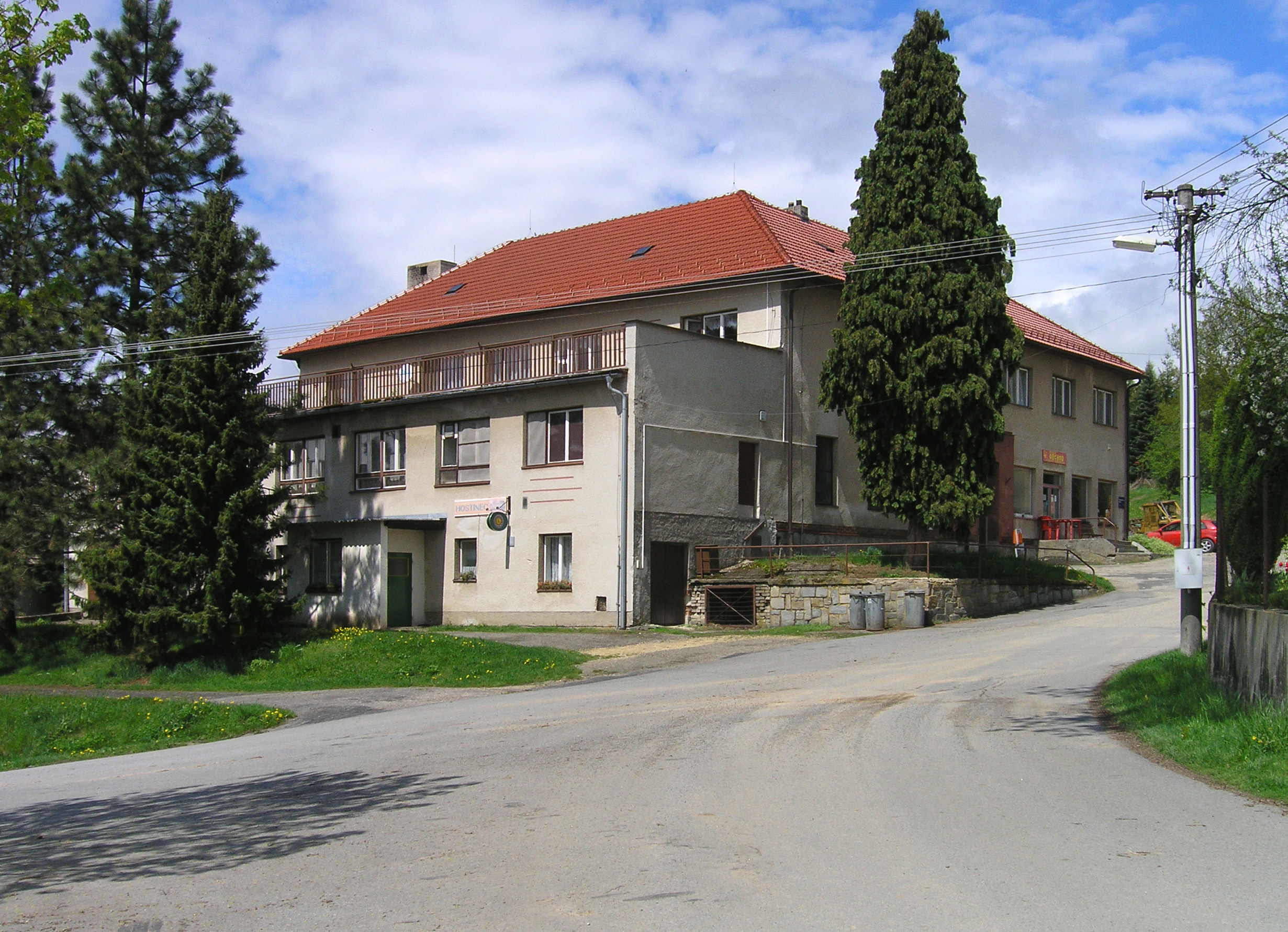
- Municipal office and pub

- Location in the Czech Republic
- Coordinates: 49°16′58″N 15°6′14″E
- Country: Czech Republic
- Region: Vysočina
- District: Pelhřimov
- First mentioned: 1549

Area
  - Total: 6.08 km^{2} (2.35 sq mi)
- Elevation: 598 m (1,962 ft)

Population (2026-01-01)
  - Total: 232
  - Density: 38.2/km^{2} (98.8/sq mi)
- Time zone: UTC+1 (CET)
  - Summer (DST): UTC+2 (CEST)
- Postal code: 394 70
- Website: www.rodinov.cz

Rodinov is a municipality and village in Pelhřimov District in the Vysočina Region of the Czech Republic. It has about 200 inhabitants.

Rodinov lies approximately 19 kilometres (12 mi) south-west of Pelhřimov, 38 km (24 mi) west of Jihlava, and 102 km (63 mi) south-east of Prague.

== Demographics ==
Historical population
| Year | Pop. | ±% |
|---|---|---|
| 1869 | 375 | — |
| 1880 | 378 | +0.8% |
| 1890 | 338 | −10.6% |
| 1900 | 349 | +3.3% |
| 1910 | 331 | −5.2% |
| 1921 | 338 | +2.1% |
| 1930 | 299 | −11.5% |
| 1950 | 213 | −28.8% |
| 1961 | 195 | −8.5% |
| 1970 | 184 | −5.6% |
| 1980 | 200 | +8.7% |
| 1991 | 201 | +0.5% |
| 2001 | 204 | +1.5% |
| 2011 | 215 | +5.4% |
| 2021 | 212 | −1.4% |
Source: Censuses
