= Horní Rápotice =

- Municipality
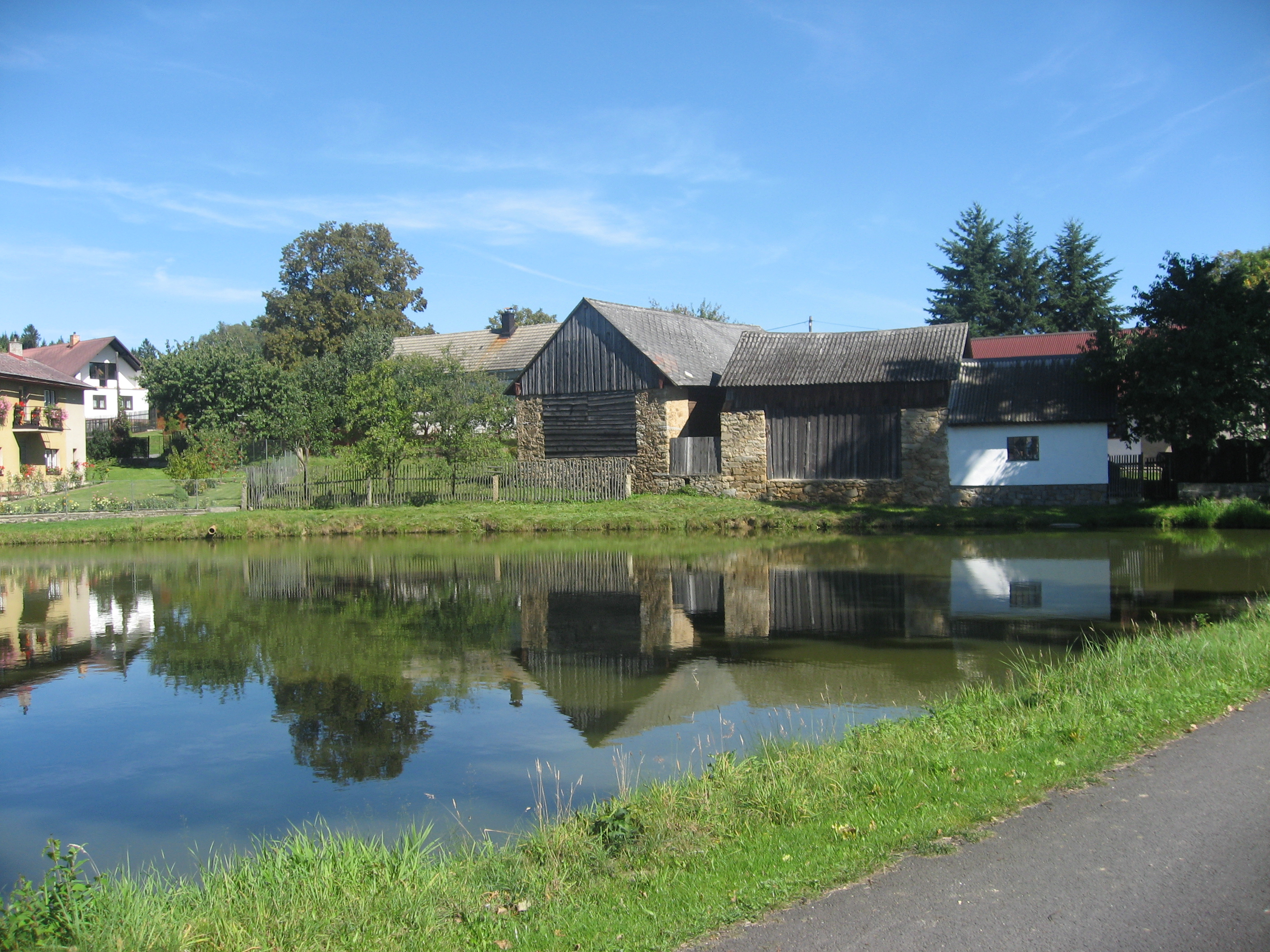
- Centre of Horní Rápotice

- Flag Coat of arms

- Location in the Czech Republic
- Coordinates: 49°34′31″N 15°19′14″E
- Country: Czech Republic
- Region: Vysočina
- District: Pelhřimov
- First mentioned: 1352

Area
  - Total: 3.98 km^{2} (1.54 sq mi)
- Elevation: 551 m (1,808 ft)

Population (2026-01-01)
  - Total: 182
  - Density: 45.7/km^{2} (118/sq mi)
- Time zone: UTC+1 (CET)
  - Summer (DST): UTC+2 (CEST)
- Postal code: 396 01
- Website: hornirapotice.cz

Horní Rápotice is a municipality and village in Pelhřimov District in the Vysočina Region of the Czech Republic. It has about 200 inhabitants.

== Demographics ==
Historical population
Year	Pop.	±%
1869	204	—
1880	227	+11.3%
1890	229	+0.9%
1900	215	−6.1%
1910	223	+3.7%
1921	227	+1.8%
1930	218	−4.0%
1950	170	−22.0%
1961	180	+5.9%
1970	166	−7.8%
1980	137	−17.5%
1991	128	−6.6%
2001	154	+20.3%
2011	157	+1.9%
2021	158	+0.6%
Source: Censuses
