= Útěchovice =

- Municipality
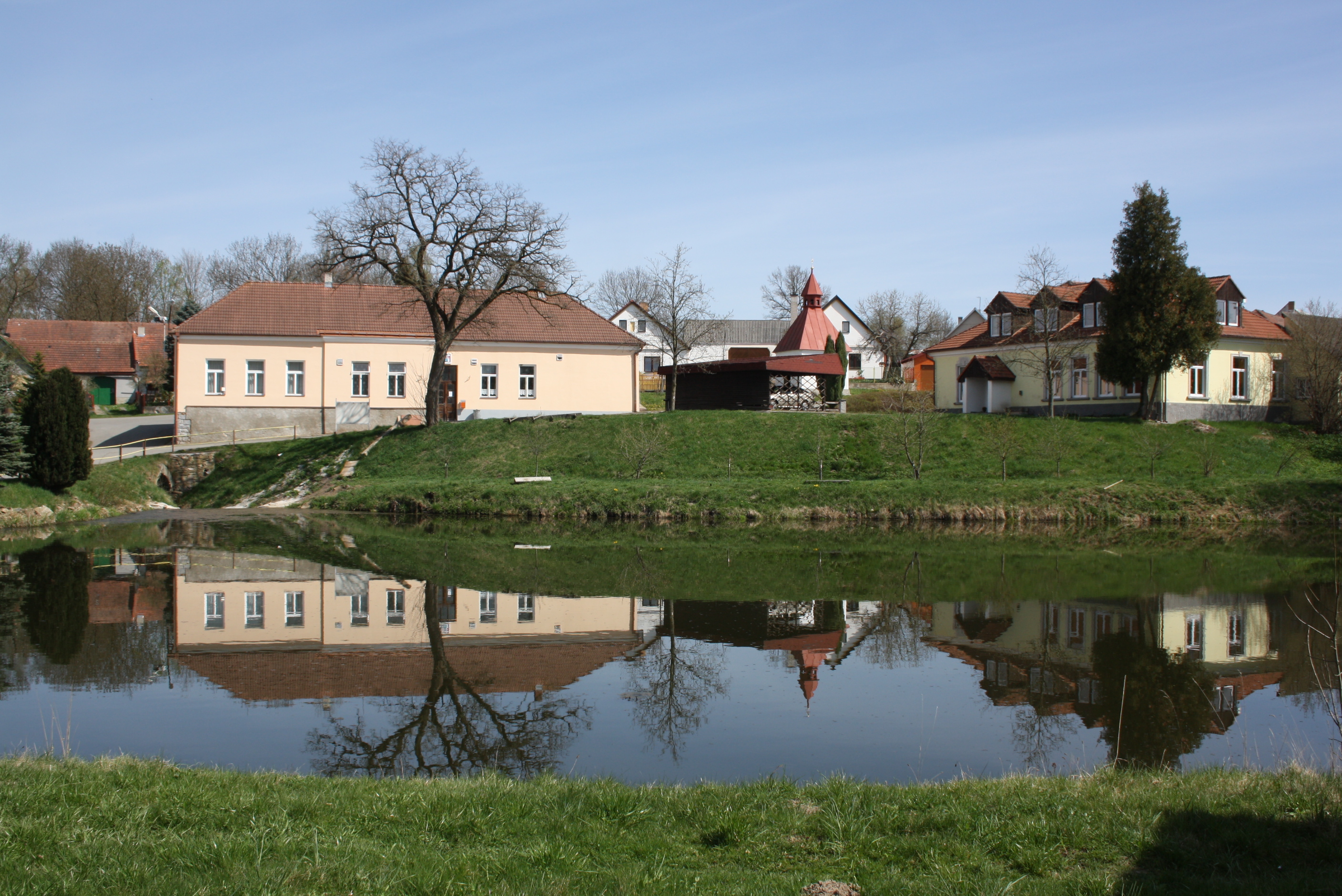
- Centre of Útěchovice

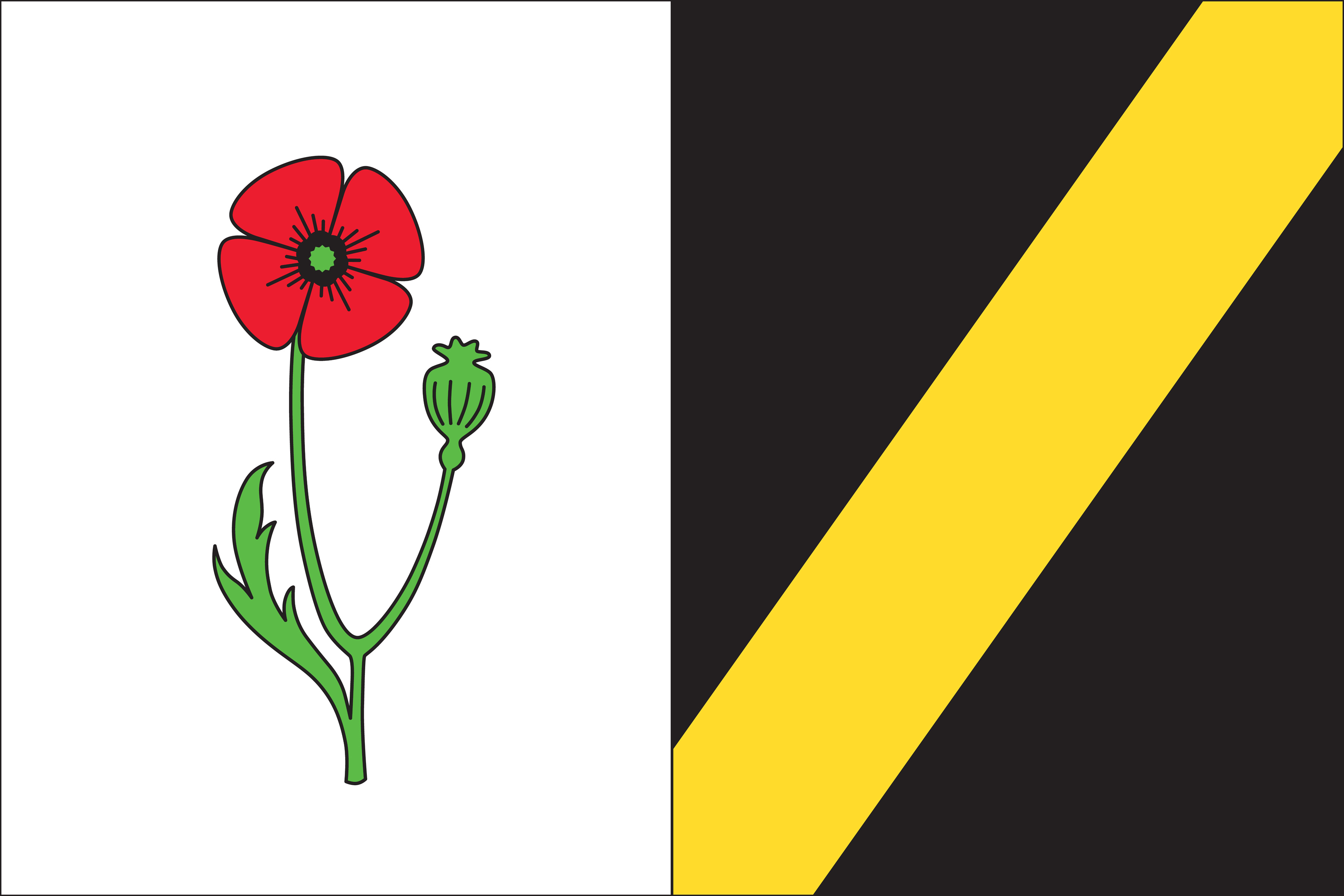
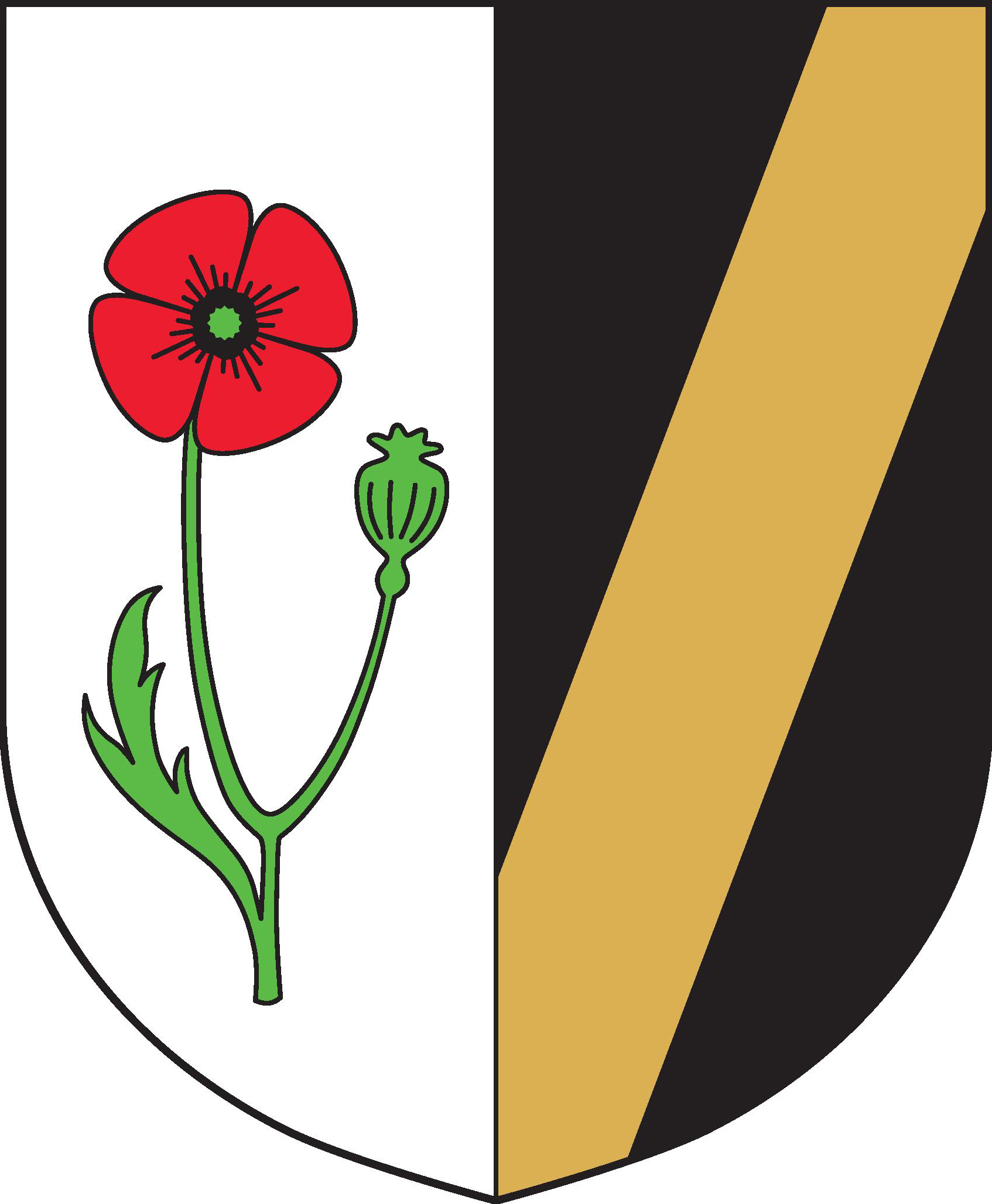
- Flag Coat of arms

- Location in the Czech Republic
- Coordinates: 49°28′41″N 15°6′59″E
- Country: Czech Republic
- Region: Vysočina
- District: Pelhřimov
- First mentioned: 1301

Area
  - Total: 6.24 km^{2} (2.41 sq mi)
- Elevation: 534 m (1,752 ft)

Population (2026-01-01)
  - Total: 63
  - Density: 10/km^{2} (26/sq mi)
- Time zone: UTC+1 (CET)
  - Summer (DST): UTC+2 (CEST)
- Postal code: 395 01
- Website: www.utechovice.cz

Útěchovice is a municipality and village in Pelhřimov District in the Vysočina Region of the Czech Republic. It has about 60 inhabitants.

Útěchovice lies approximately 9 kilometres (6 mi) north-west of Pelhřimov, 36 km (22 mi) west of Jihlava, and 85 km (53 mi) south-east of Prague.

== Demographics ==
Historical population
Year	Pop.	±%
1869	272	—
1880	310	+14.0%
1890	311	+0.3%
1900	313	+0.6%
1910	313	+0.0%
1921	290	−7.3%
1930	264	−9.0%
1950	158	−40.2%
1961	166	+5.1%
1970	129	−22.3%
1980	101	−21.7%
1991	71	−29.7%
2001	85	+19.7%
2011	72	−15.3%
2021	55	−23.6%
Source: Censuses
