= Komorovice =

- Municipality
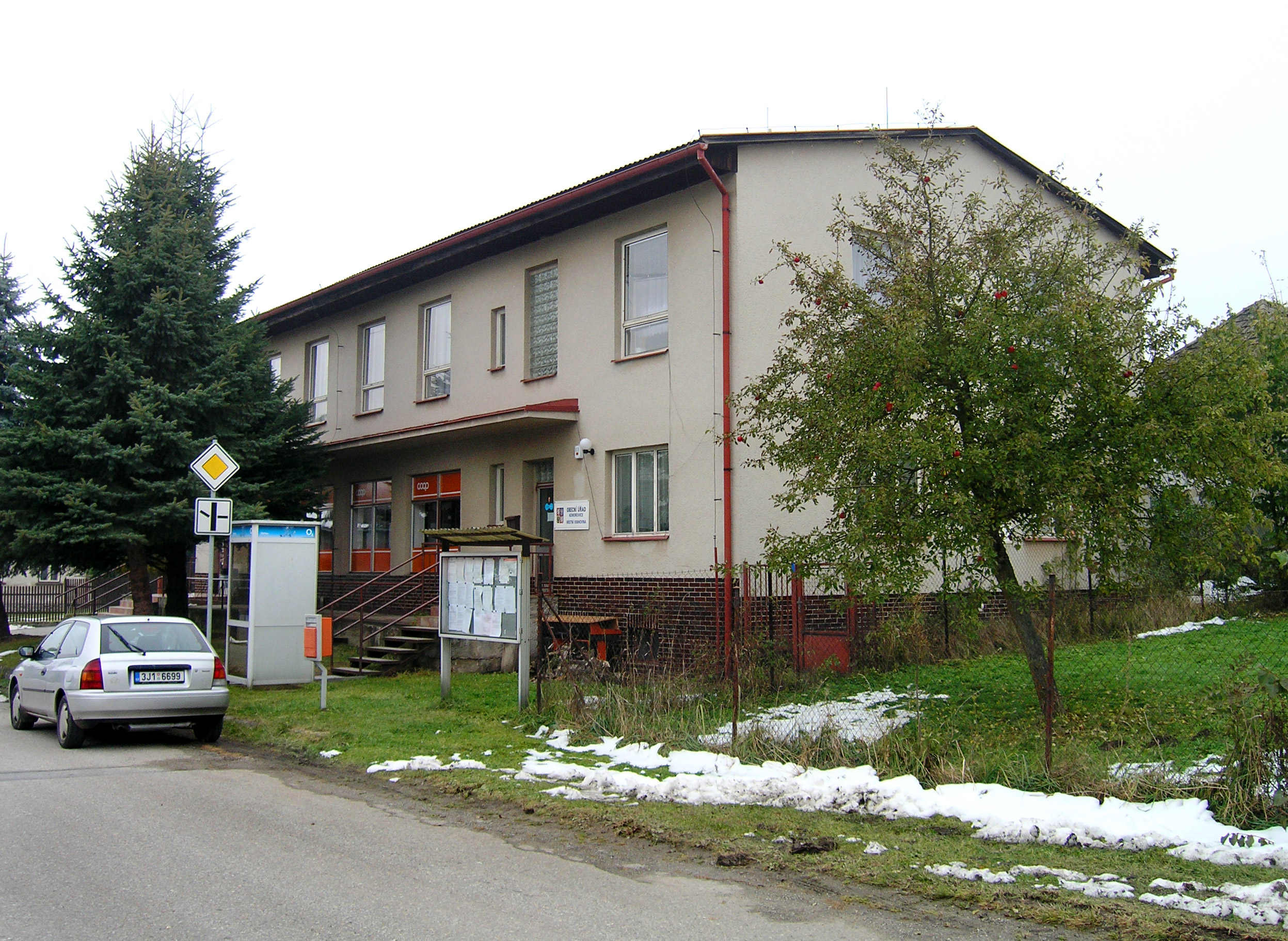
- Municipal office

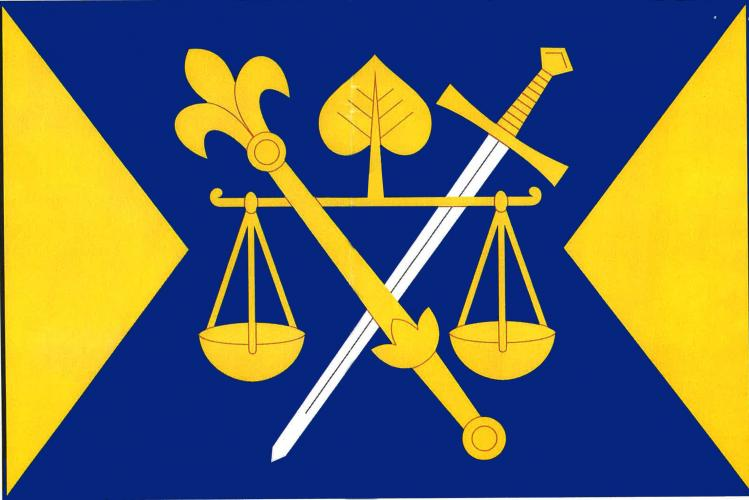
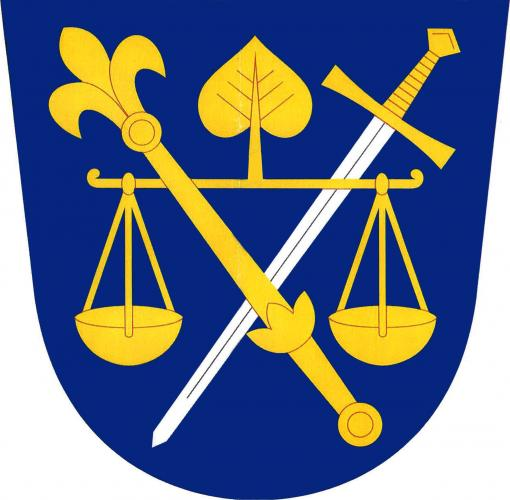
- Flag Coat of arms

- Location in the Czech Republic
- Coordinates: 49°30′31″N 15°20′44″E
- Country: Czech Republic
- Region: Vysočina
- District: Pelhřimov
- First mentioned: 1226

Area
  - Total: 3.06 km^{2} (1.18 sq mi)
- Elevation: 573 m (1,880 ft)

Population (2026-01-01)
  - Total: 202
  - Density: 66.0/km^{2} (171/sq mi)
- Time zone: UTC+1 (CET)
  - Summer (DST): UTC+2 (CEST)
- Postal code: 396 01
- Website: www.komorovice.cz

Komorovice is a municipality and village in Pelhřimov District in the Vysočina Region of the Czech Republic. It has about 200 inhabitants.

Komorovice lies approximately 13 kilometres (8 mi) north-east of Pelhřimov, 22 km (14 mi) north-west of Jihlava, and 93 km (58 mi) south-east of Prague.

== Demographics ==
Historical population
Year	Pop.	±%
1869	200	—
1880	226	+13.0%
1890	204	−9.7%
1900	183	−10.3%
1910	194	+6.0%
1921	218	+12.4%
1930	187	−14.2%
1950	167	−10.7%
1961	171	+2.4%
1970	170	−0.6%
1980	184	+8.2%
1991	168	−8.7%
2001	167	−0.6%
2011	183	+9.6%
2021	188	+2.7%
Source: Censuses
