= Čejov =

- Municipality
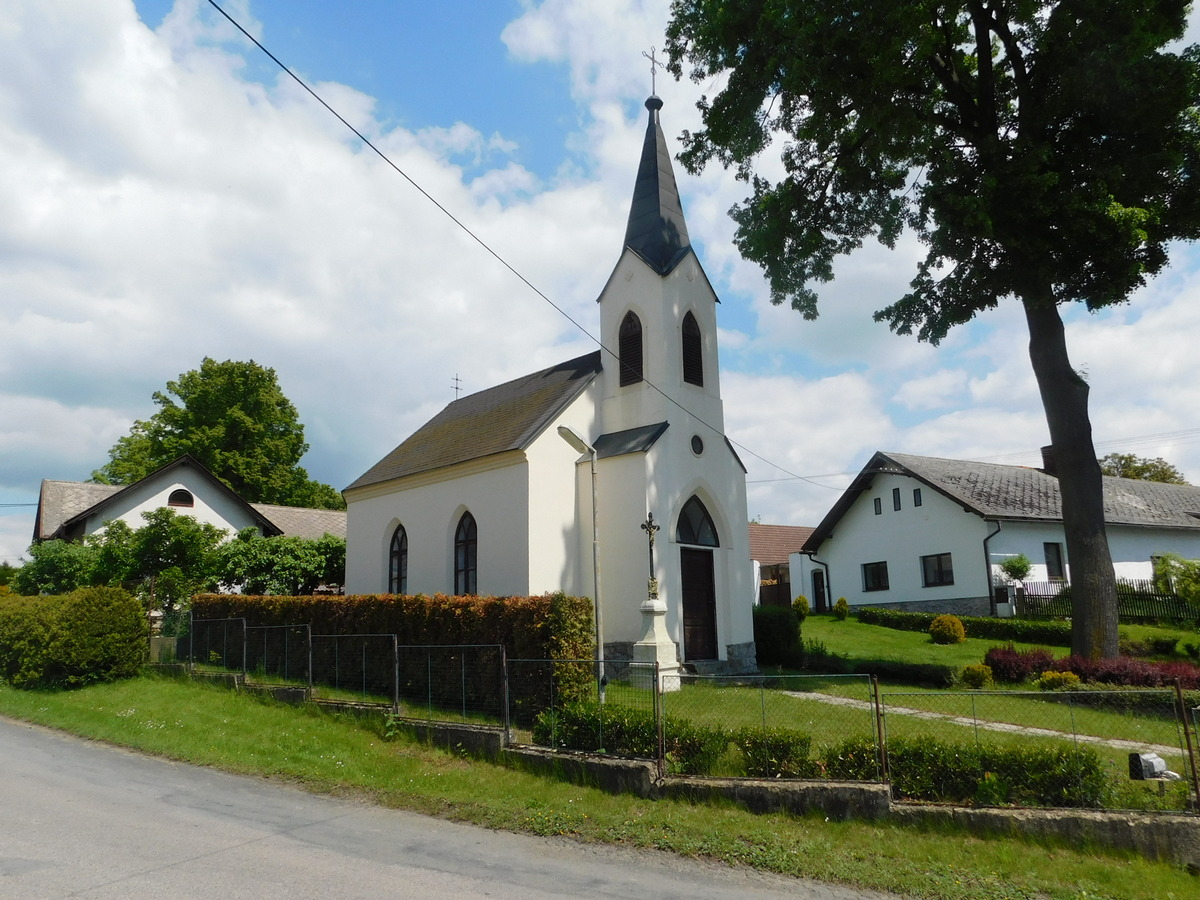
- Chapel in Čejov

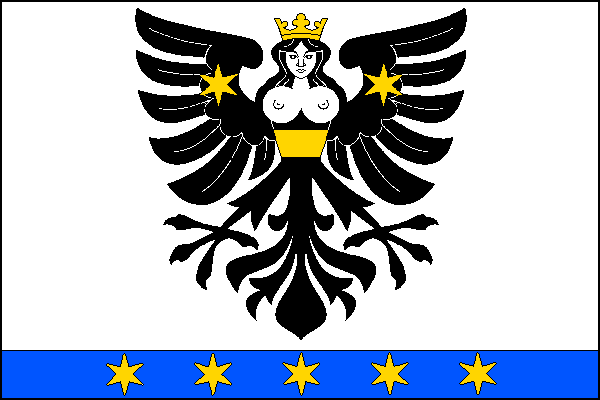
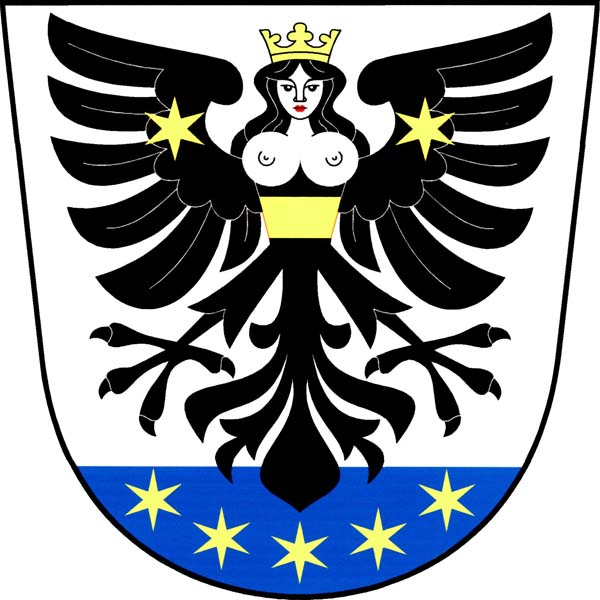
- Flag Coat of arms

- Location in the Czech Republic
- Coordinates: 49°33′57″N 15°22′45″E
- Country: Czech Republic
- Region: Vysočina
- District: Pelhřimov
- First mentioned: 1370

Area
  - Total: 8.00 km^{2} (3.09 sq mi)
- Elevation: 489 m (1,604 ft)

Population (2026-01-01)
  - Total: 647
  - Density: 80.9/km^{2} (209/sq mi)
- Time zone: UTC+1 (CET)
  - Summer (DST): UTC+2 (CEST)
- Postal code: 396 01
- Website: www.cejov.cz

Čejov is a municipality and village in Pelhřimov District in the Vysočina Region of the Czech Republic. It has about 600 inhabitants.

== Administrative division ==
Čejov consists of two municipal parts (in brackets population according to the 2021 census):

- Čejov (566)
- Hadina (29)

== Demographics ==
Historical population
| Year | Pop. | ±% |
|---|---|---|
| 1869 | 732 | — |
| 1880 | 755 | +3.1% |
| 1890 | 804 | +6.5% |
| 1900 | 856 | +6.5% |
| 1910 | 916 | +7.0% |
| 1921 | 858 | −6.3% |
| 1930 | 786 | −8.4% |
| 1950 | 658 | −16.3% |
| 1961 | 619 | −5.9% |
| 1970 | 561 | −9.4% |
| 1980 | 553 | −1.4% |
| 1991 | 439 | −20.6% |
| 2001 | 439 | +0.0% |
| 2011 | 514 | +17.1% |
| 2021 | 595 | +15.8% |
Source: Censuses
