= Velký Rybník =

- Municipality
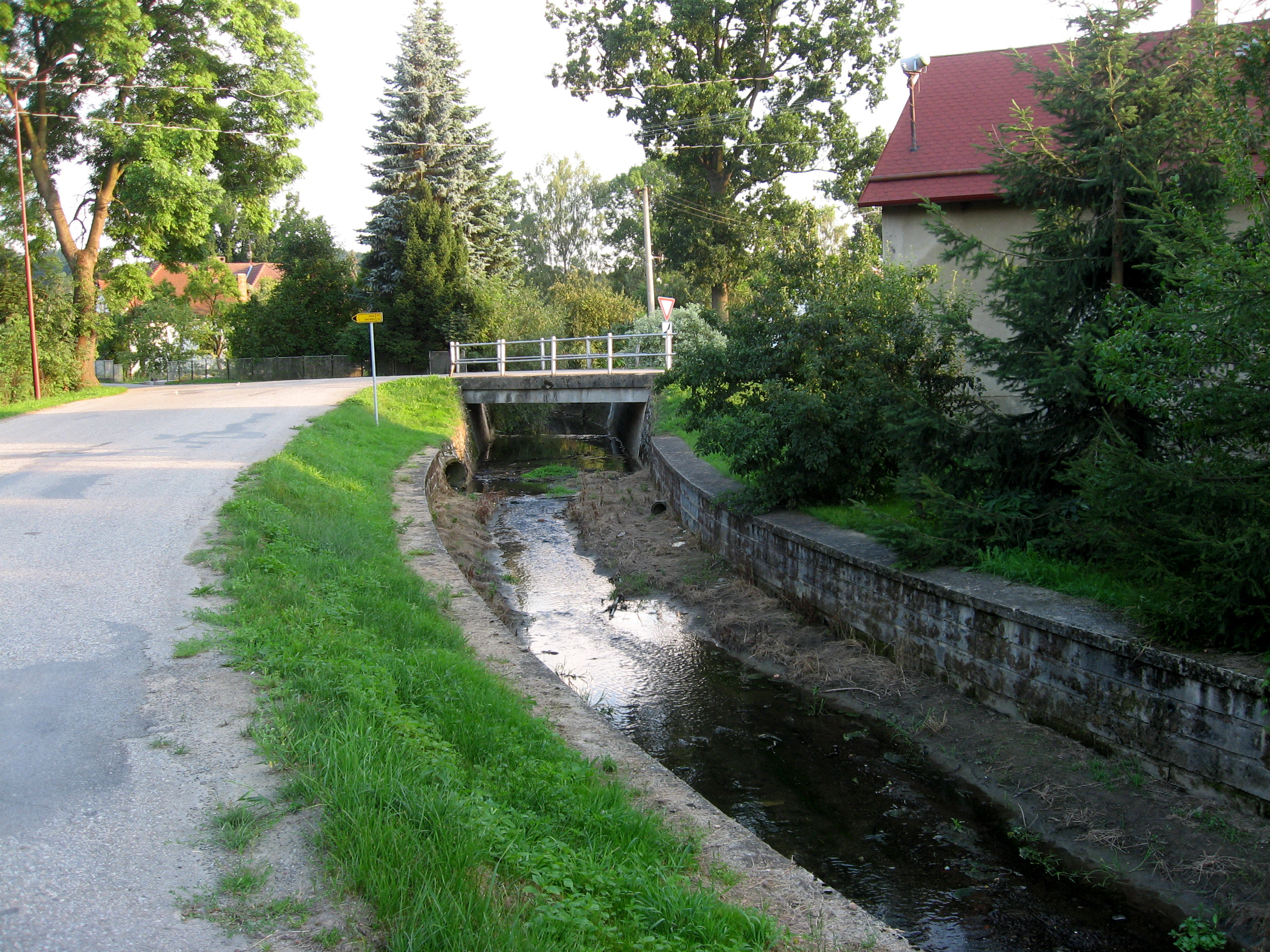
- The stream Kopaninský potok

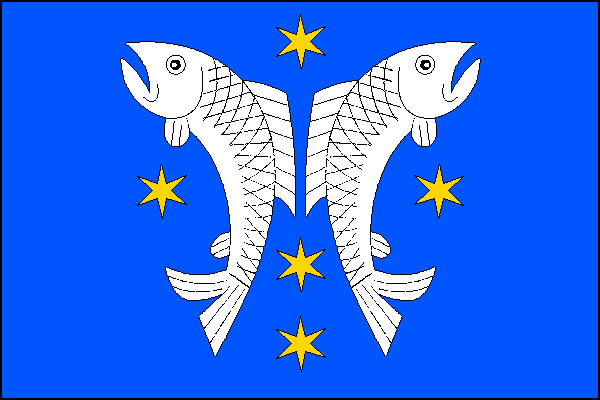
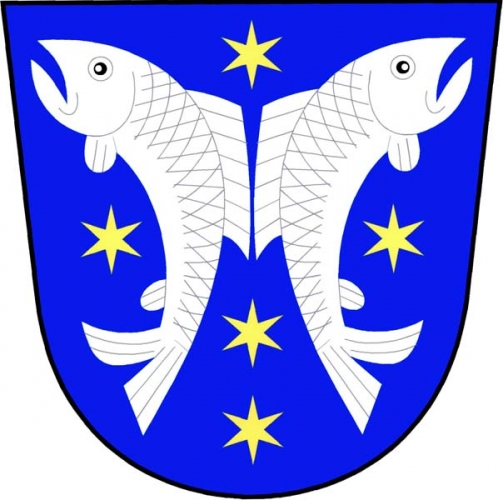
- Flag Coat of arms

- Location in the Czech Republic
- Coordinates: 49°29′25″N 15°18′29″E
- Country: Czech Republic
- Region: Vysočina
- District: Pelhřimov
- First mentioned: 1379

Area
  - Total: 6.27 km^{2} (2.42 sq mi)
- Elevation: 478 m (1,568 ft)

Population (2026-01-01)
  - Total: 202
  - Density: 32.2/km^{2} (83.4/sq mi)
- Time zone: UTC+1 (CET)
  - Summer (DST): UTC+2 (CEST)
- Postal code: 393 01
- Website: www.velkyrybnik.cz

Velký Rybník is a municipality and village in Pelhřimov District in the Vysočina Region of the Czech Republic. It has about 200 inhabitants.

Velký Rybník lies approximately 10 kilometres (6 mi) north-east of Pelhřimov, 23 km (14 mi) north-west of Jihlava, and 93 km (58 mi) south-east of Prague.

== Demographics ==
Historical population
Year	Pop.	±%
1869	307	—
1880	335	+9.1%
1890	365	+9.0%
1900	309	−15.3%
1910	318	+2.9%
1921	306	−3.8%
1930	270	−11.8%
1950	175	−35.2%
1961	200	+14.3%
1970	159	−20.5%
1980	177	+11.3%
1991	181	+2.3%
2001	165	−8.8%
2011	168	+1.8%
2021	192	+14.3%
Source: Censuses
