= Budíkov =

- Municipality
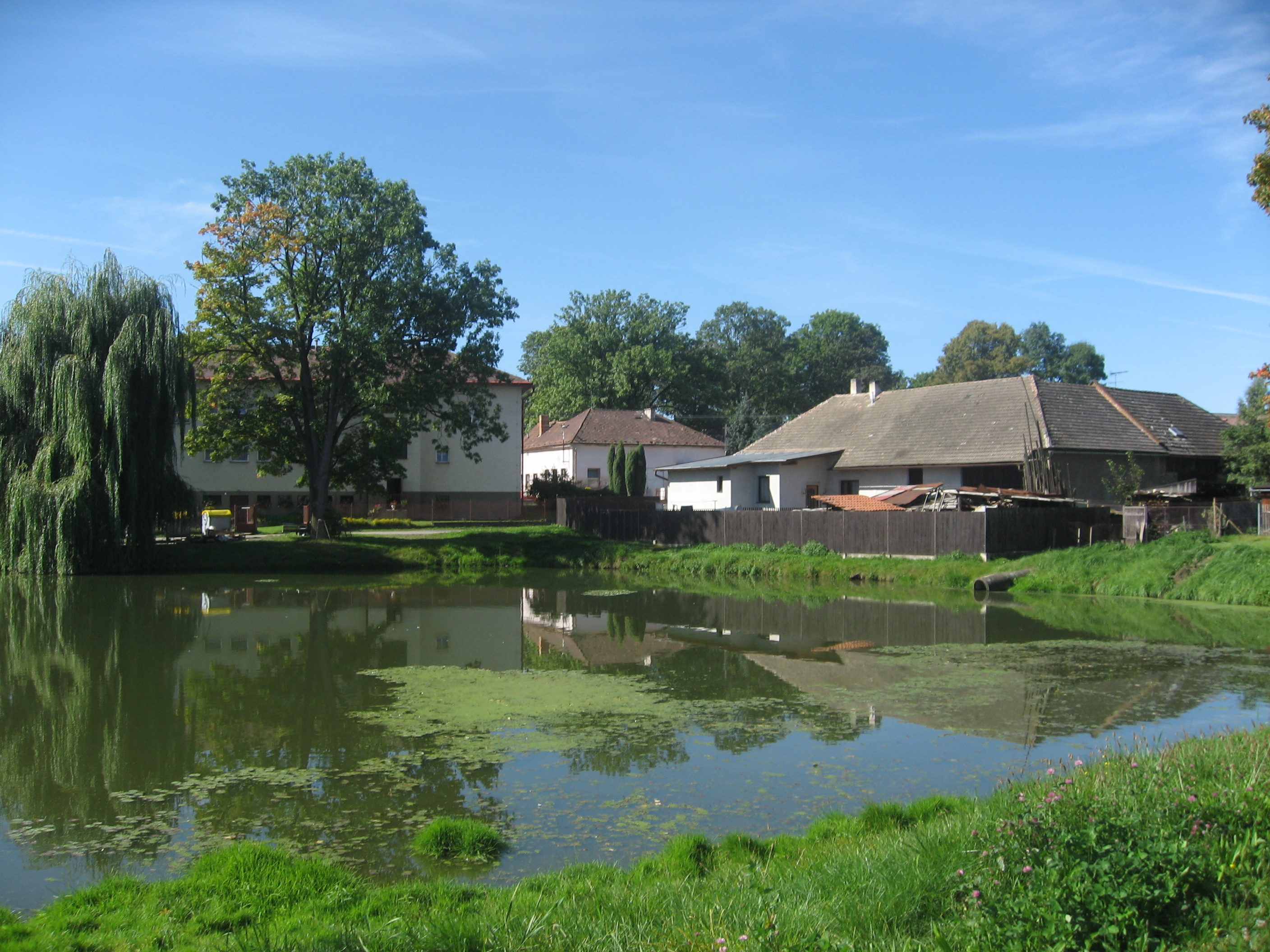
- Centre of Budíkov

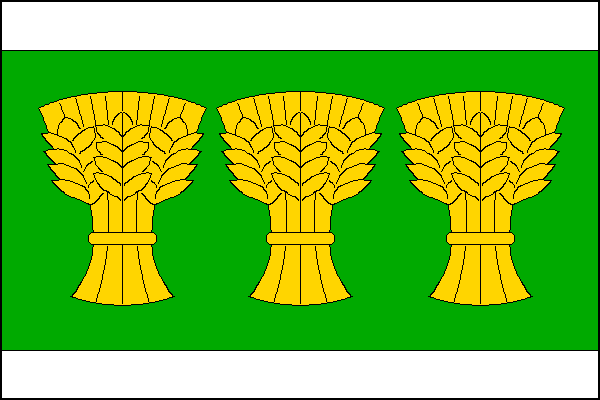
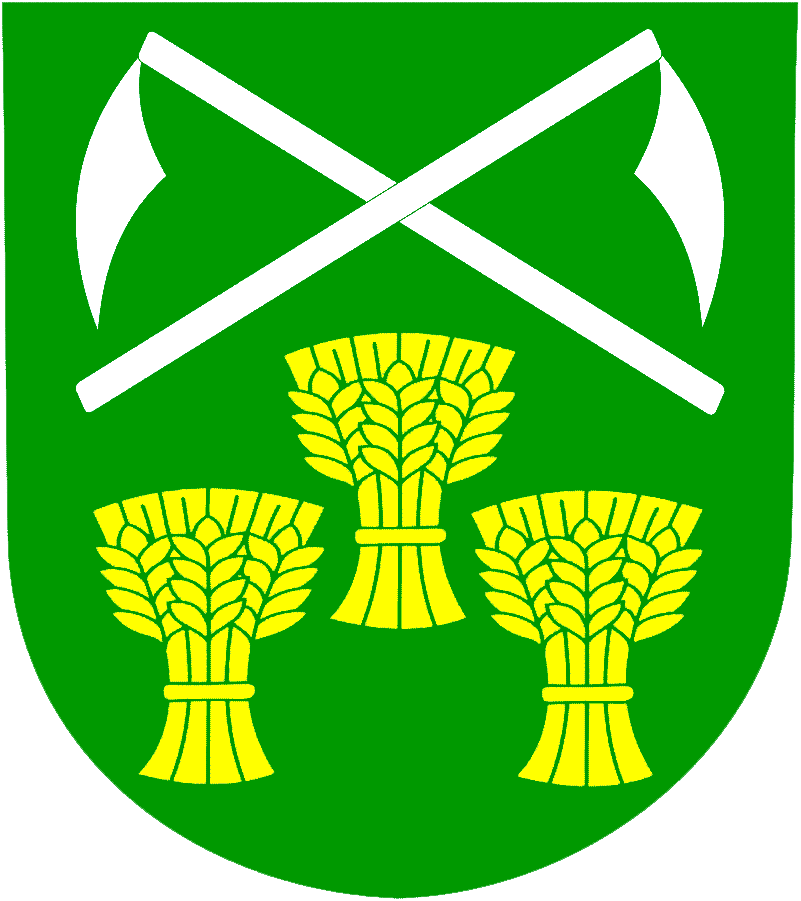
- Flag Coat of arms

- Location in the Czech Republic
- Coordinates: 49°34′45″N 15°21′46″E
- Country: Czech Republic
- Region: Vysočina
- District: Pelhřimov
- First mentioned: 1226

Area
  - Total: 6.65 km^{2} (2.57 sq mi)
- Elevation: 495 m (1,624 ft)

Population (2026-01-01)
  - Total: 331
  - Density: 49.8/km^{2} (129/sq mi)
- Time zone: UTC+1 (CET)
  - Summer (DST): UTC+2 (CEST)
- Postal code: 396 01
- Website: obecbudikov.cz

Budíkov is a municipality and village in Pelhřimov District in the Vysočina Region of the Czech Republic. It has about 300 inhabitants.

== Administrative division ==
Budíkov consists of three municipal parts (in brackets population according to the 2021 census):

- Budíkov (267)
- Malý Budíkov (45)
- Pusté Lhotsko (16)

== History ==
The first written mention of Budíkov is from 1226.

== Demographics ==
Historical population
| Year | Pop. | ±% |
|---|---|---|
| 1869 | 562 | — |
| 1880 | 555 | −1.2% |
| 1890 | 542 | −2.3% |
| 1900 | 487 | −10.1% |
| 1910 | 504 | +3.5% |
| 1921 | 526 | +4.4% |
| 1930 | 474 | −9.9% |
| 1950 | 394 | −16.9% |
| 1961 | 382 | −3.0% |
| 1970 | 354 | −7.3% |
| 1980 | 316 | −10.7% |
| 1991 | 284 | −10.1% |
| 2001 | 269 | −5.3% |
| 2011 | 320 | +19.0% |
| 2021 | 328 | +2.5% |
Source: Censuses
