= Útěchovice pod Stražištěm =

- Municipality
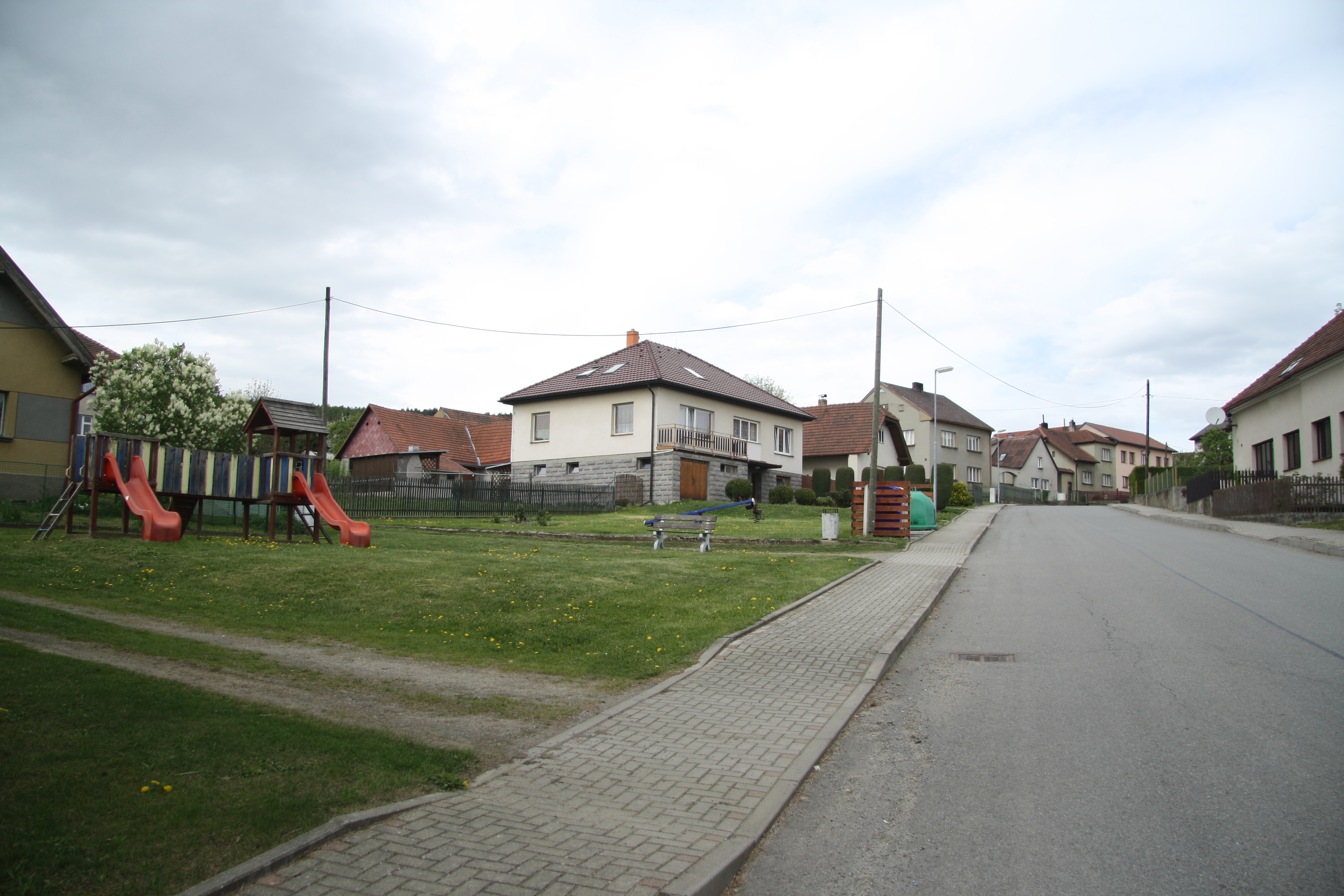
- Centre of Útěchovice pod Stražištěm

- Location in the Czech Republic
- Coordinates: 49°32′19″N 15°1′45″E
- Country: Czech Republic
- Region: Vysočina
- District: Pelhřimov
- First mentioned: 1410

Area
  - Total: 4.17 km^{2} (1.61 sq mi)
- Elevation: 590 m (1,940 ft)

Population (2026-01-01)
  - Total: 104
  - Density: 24.9/km^{2} (64.6/sq mi)
- Time zone: UTC+1 (CET)
  - Summer (DST): UTC+2 (CEST)
- Postal code: 395 01
- Website: www.outechovice.cz

Útěchovice pod Stražištěm is a municipality and village in Pelhřimov District in the Vysočina Region of the Czech Republic. It has about 100 inhabitants.

Útěchovice pod Stražištěm lies approximately 19 kilometres (12 mi) north-west of Pelhřimov, 44 km (27 mi) west of Jihlava, and 76 km (47 mi) south-east of Prague.

== Demographics ==
Historical population
Year	Pop.	±%
1869	290	—
1880	302	+4.1%
1890	302	+0.0%
1900	284	−6.0%
1910	287	+1.1%
1921	253	−11.8%
1930	243	−4.0%
1950	169	−30.5%
1961	181	+7.1%
1970	190	+5.0%
1980	161	−15.3%
1991	138	−14.3%
2001	123	−10.9%
2011	108	−12.2%
2021	104	−3.7%
Source: Censuses
