= Čelistná =

- Municipality
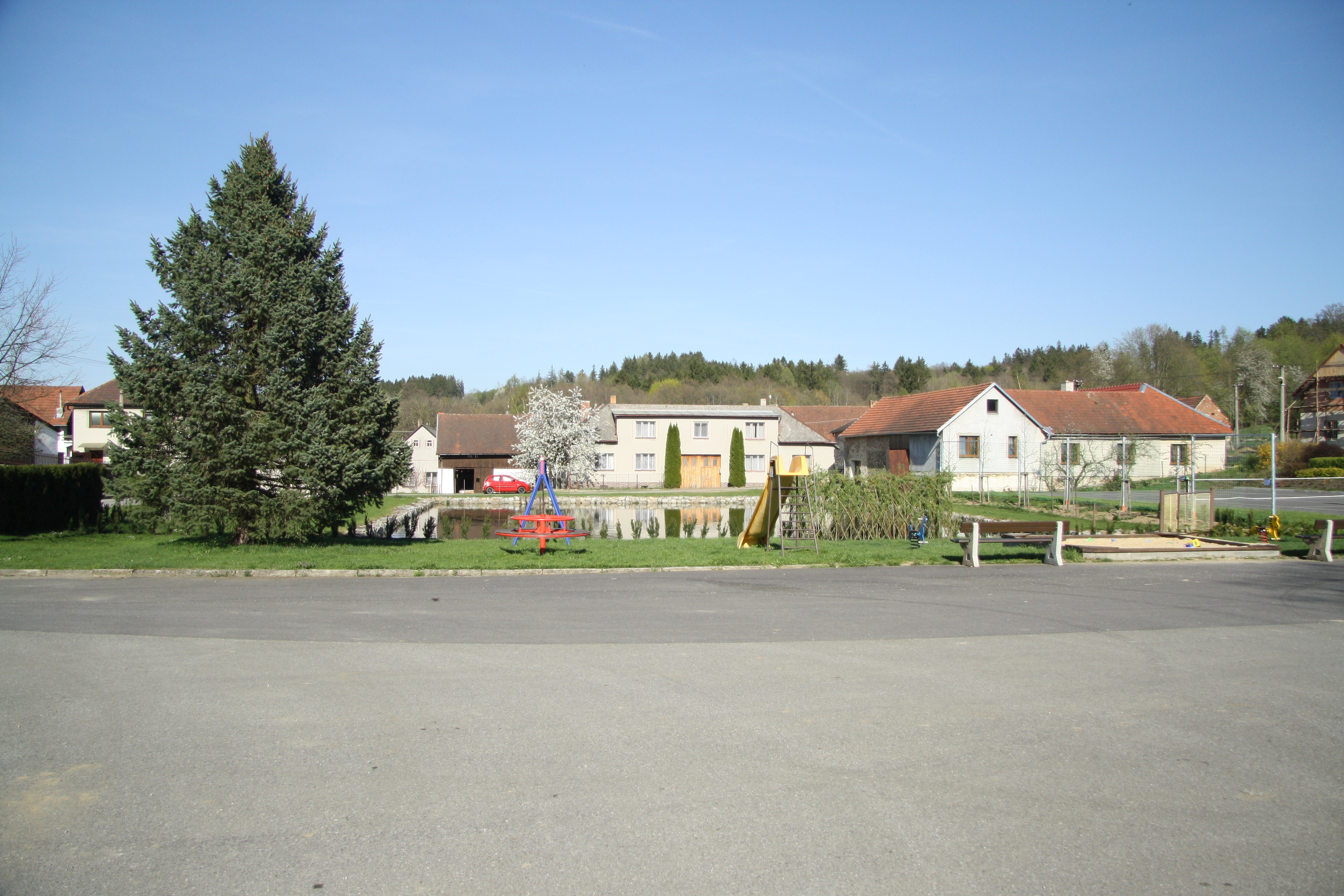
- Centre of Čelistná

- Location in the Czech Republic
- Coordinates: 49°21′37″N 15°12′23″E
- Country: Czech Republic
- Region: Vysočina
- District: Pelhřimov
- First mentioned: 1384

Area
  - Total: 3.08 km^{2} (1.19 sq mi)
- Elevation: 588 m (1,929 ft)

Population (2026-01-01)
  - Total: 88
  - Density: 29/km^{2} (74/sq mi)
- Time zone: UTC+1 (CET)
  - Summer (DST): UTC+2 (CEST)
- Postal code: 393 01
- Website: www.celistna.cz

Čelistná is a municipality and village in Pelhřimov District in the Vysočina Region of the Czech Republic. It has about 90 inhabitants.

Čelistná lies approximately 8 kilometres (5 mi) south of Pelhřimov, 28 km (17 mi) west of Jihlava, and 99 km (62 mi) south-east of Prague.

== Demographics ==
Historical population
| Year | Pop. | ±% |
|---|---|---|
| 1869 | 131 | — |
| 1880 | 148 | +13.0% |
| 1890 | 161 | +8.8% |
| 1900 | 151 | −6.2% |
| 1910 | 135 | −10.6% |
| 1921 | 132 | −2.2% |
| 1930 | 116 | −12.1% |
| 1950 | 74 | −36.2% |
| 1961 | 114 | +54.1% |
| 1970 | 101 | −11.4% |
| 1980 | 122 | +20.8% |
| 1991 | 125 | +2.5% |
| 2001 | 104 | −16.8% |
| 2011 | 107 | +2.9% |
| 2021 | 89 | −16.8% |
Source: Censuses
