= Mladé Bříště =

- Municipality
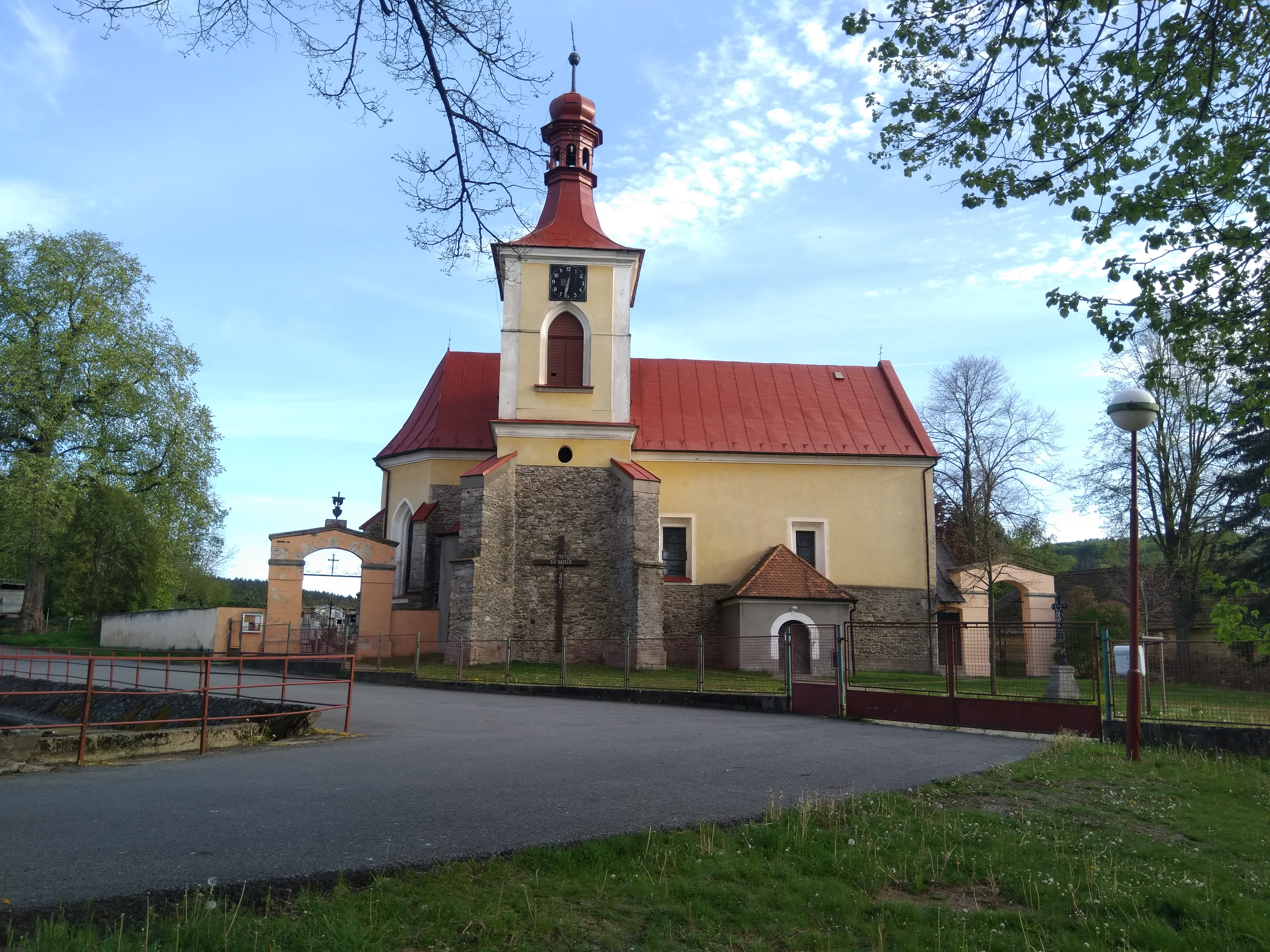
- Church of Saint John the Baptist

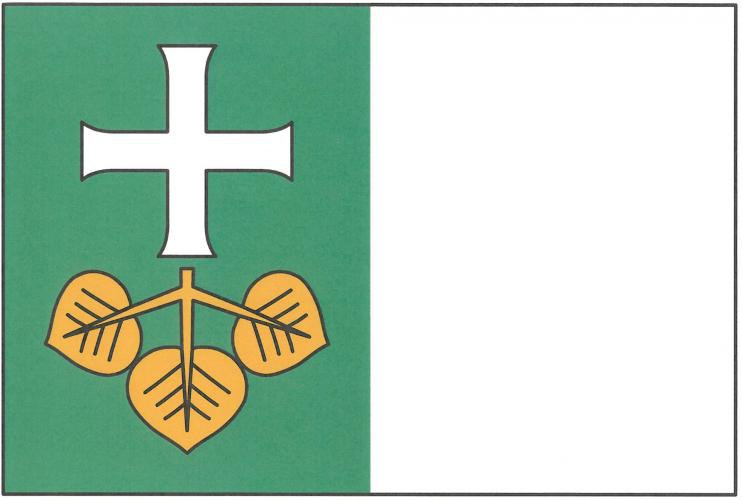
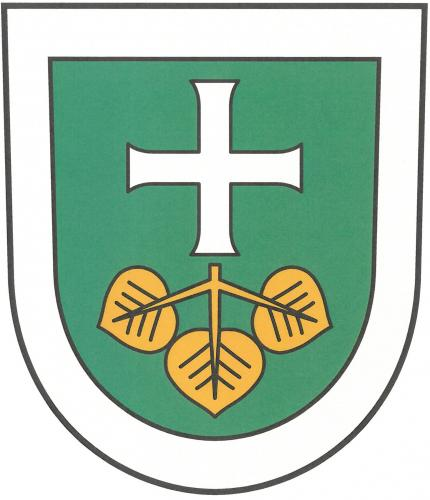
- Flag Coat of arms

- Location in the Czech Republic
- Coordinates: 49°29′29″N 15°20′7″E
- Country: Czech Republic
- Region: Vysočina
- District: Pelhřimov
- First mentioned: 1226

Area
  - Total: 5.33 km^{2} (2.06 sq mi)
- Elevation: 510 m (1,670 ft)

Population (2026-01-01)
  - Total: 293
  - Density: 55.0/km^{2} (142/sq mi)
- Time zone: UTC+1 (CET)
  - Summer (DST): UTC+2 (CEST)
- Postal codes: 394 43, 396 01
- Website: www.mladebriste.cz

Mladé Bříště is a municipality and village in Pelhřimov District in the Vysočina Region of the Czech Republic. It has about 300 inhabitants.

== Administrative division ==
Mladé Bříště consists of three municipal parts (in brackets population according to the 2021 census):

- Mladé Bříště (156)
- Hojkovy (25)
- Záhoří (75)

== Demographics ==
Historical population
Year	Pop.	±%
1869	437	—
1880	445	+1.8%
1890	446	+0.2%
1900	401	−10.1%
1910	415	+3.5%
1921	393	−5.3%
1930	356	−9.4%
1950	291	−18.3%
1961	282	−3.1%
1970	248	−12.1%
1980	230	−7.3%
1991	218	−5.2%
2001	217	−0.5%
2011	234	+7.8%
2021	256	+9.4%
Source: Censuses
