= Žirov =

- Municipality
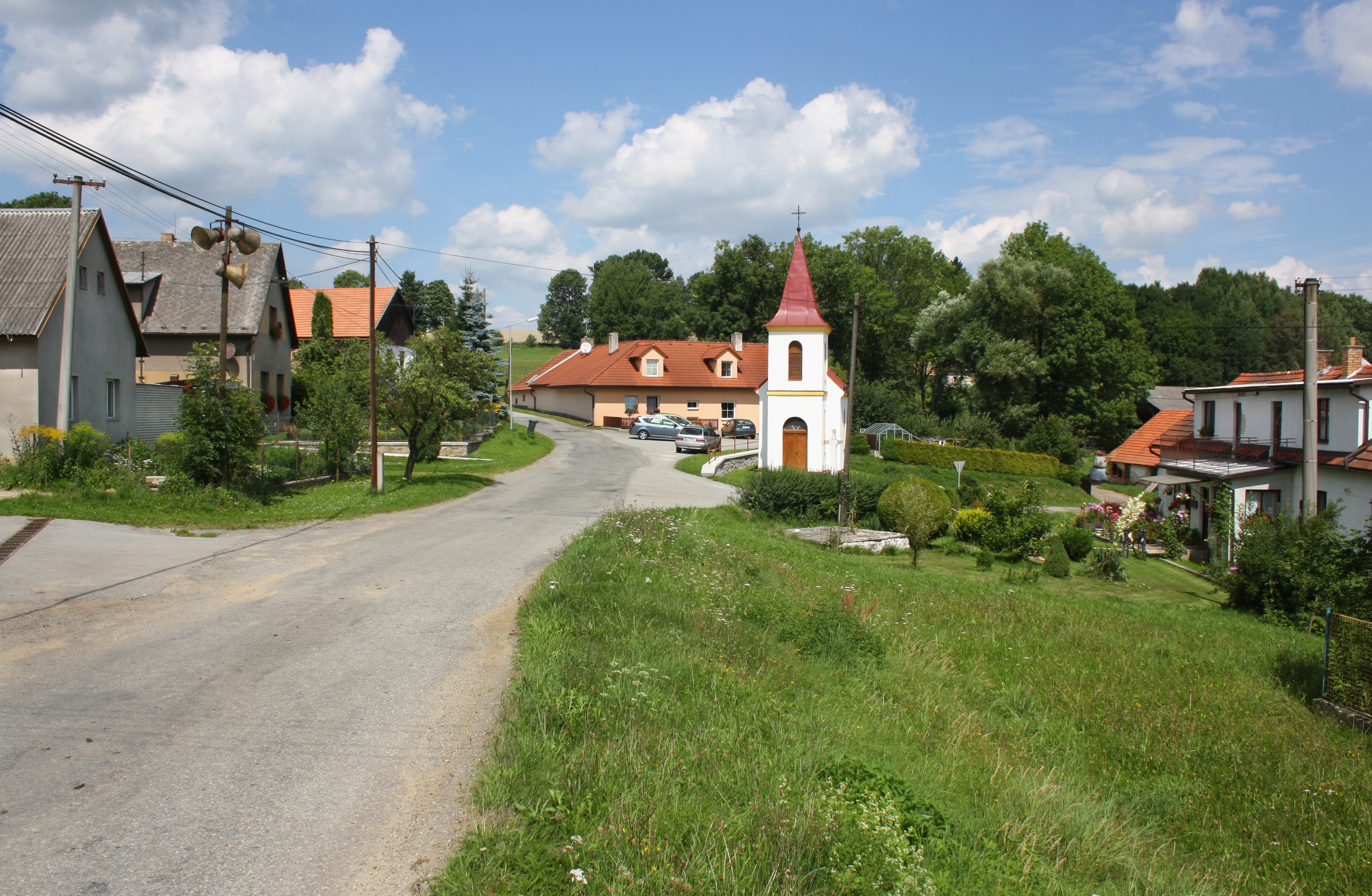
- Eastern part of Žirov

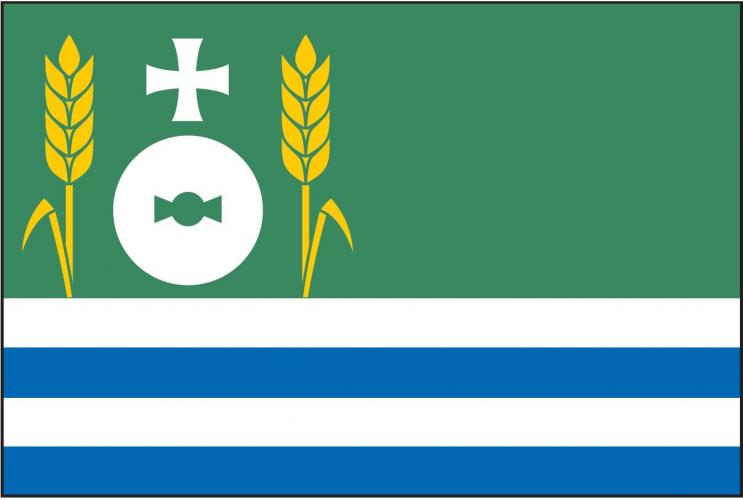
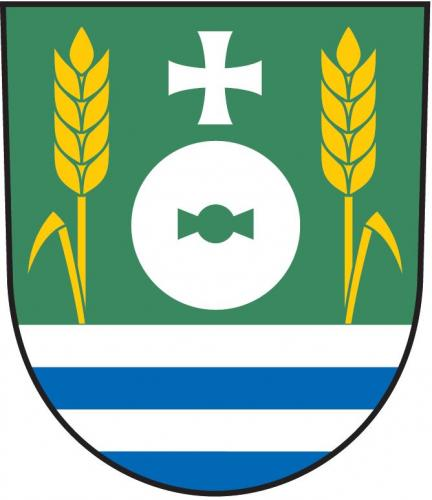
- Flag Coat of arms

- Location in the Czech Republic
- Coordinates: 49°27′51″N 15°19′25″E
- Country: Czech Republic
- Region: Vysočina
- District: Pelhřimov
- First mentioned: 1379

Area
  - Total: 2.82 km^{2} (1.09 sq mi)
- Elevation: 564 m (1,850 ft)

Population (2026-01-01)
  - Total: 87
  - Density: 31/km^{2} (80/sq mi)
- Time zone: UTC+1 (CET)
  - Summer (DST): UTC+2 (CEST)
- Postal code: 393 01
- Website: www.zirov.cz

Žirov is a municipality and village in Pelhřimov District in the Vysočina Region of the Czech Republic. It has about 90 inhabitants.

Žirov lies approximately 9 kilometres (6 mi) north-east of Pelhřimov, 21 km (13 mi) west of Jihlava, and 95 km (59 mi) south-east of Prague.

== Demographics ==
Historical population
| Year | Pop. | ±% |
|---|---|---|
| 1869 | 297 | — |
| 1880 | 271 | −8.8% |
| 1890 | 226 | −16.6% |
| 1900 | 250 | +10.6% |
| 1910 | 218 | −12.8% |
| 1921 | 187 | −14.2% |
| 1930 | 192 | +2.7% |
| 1950 | 148 | −22.9% |
| 1961 | 161 | +8.8% |
| 1970 | 130 | −19.3% |
| 1980 | 92 | −29.2% |
| 1991 | 71 | −22.8% |
| 2001 | 62 | −12.7% |
| 2011 | 72 | +16.1% |
| 2021 | 84 | +16.7% |
Source: Censuses
