= Kojčice =

- Municipality
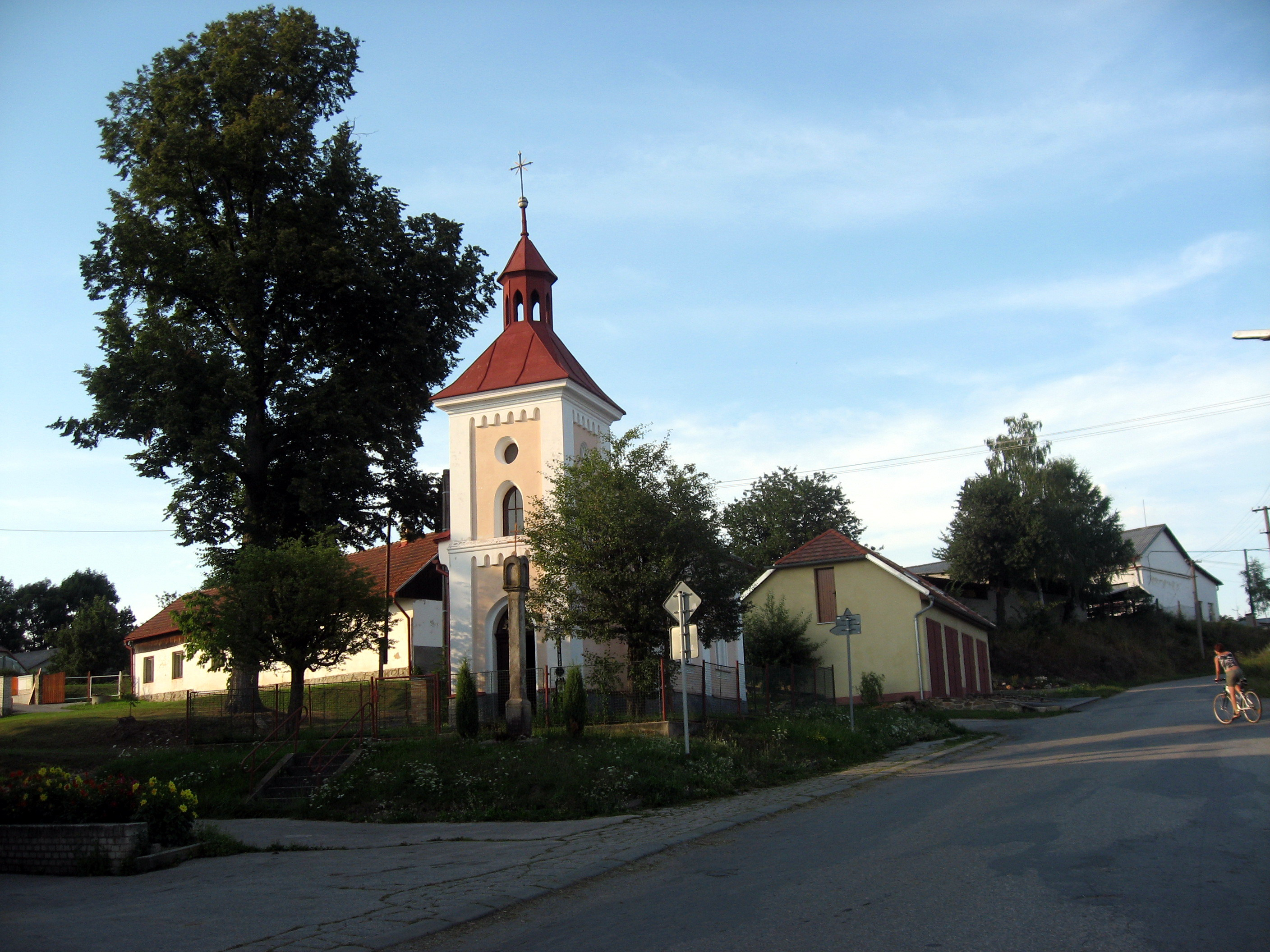
- Chapel of Saint John of Nepomuk

- Location in the Czech Republic
- Coordinates: 49°28′34″N 15°15′21″E
- Country: Czech Republic
- Region: Vysočina
- District: Pelhřimov
- First mentioned: 1379

Area
  - Total: 5.96 km^{2} (2.30 sq mi)
- Elevation: 488 m (1,601 ft)

Population (2026-01-01)
  - Total: 354
  - Density: 59.4/km^{2} (154/sq mi)
- Time zone: UTC+1 (CET)
  - Summer (DST): UTC+2 (CEST)
- Postal code: 394 09
- Website: www.kojcice.cz

Kojčice is a municipality and village in Pelhřimov District in the Vysočina Region of the Czech Republic. It has about 400 inhabitants.

Kojčice lies approximately 6 kilometres (4 mi) north-east of Pelhřimov, 26 km (16 mi) west of Jihlava, and 91 km (57 mi) south-east of Prague.

== Demographics ==
Historical population
Year	Pop.	±%
1869	357	—
1880	409	+14.6%
1890	418	+2.2%
1900	422	+1.0%
1910	405	−4.0%
1921	405	+0.0%
1930	336	−17.0%
1950	258	−23.2%
1961	250	−3.1%
1970	223	−10.8%
1980	232	+4.0%
1991	263	+13.4%
2001	280	+6.5%
2011	312	+11.4%
2021	340	+9.0%
Source: Censuses
