= Kejžlice =

- Municipality
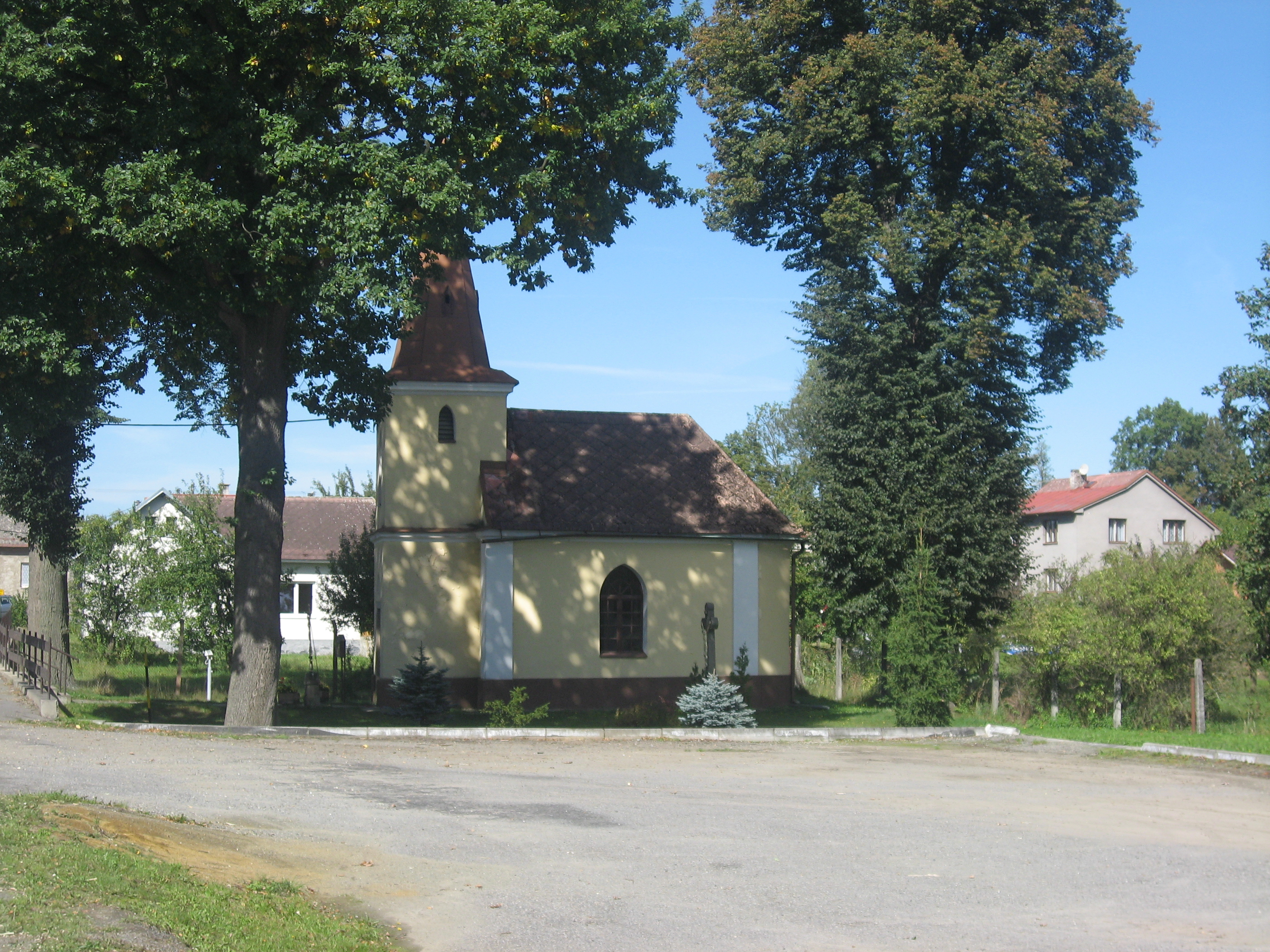
- Chapel in Kejžlice

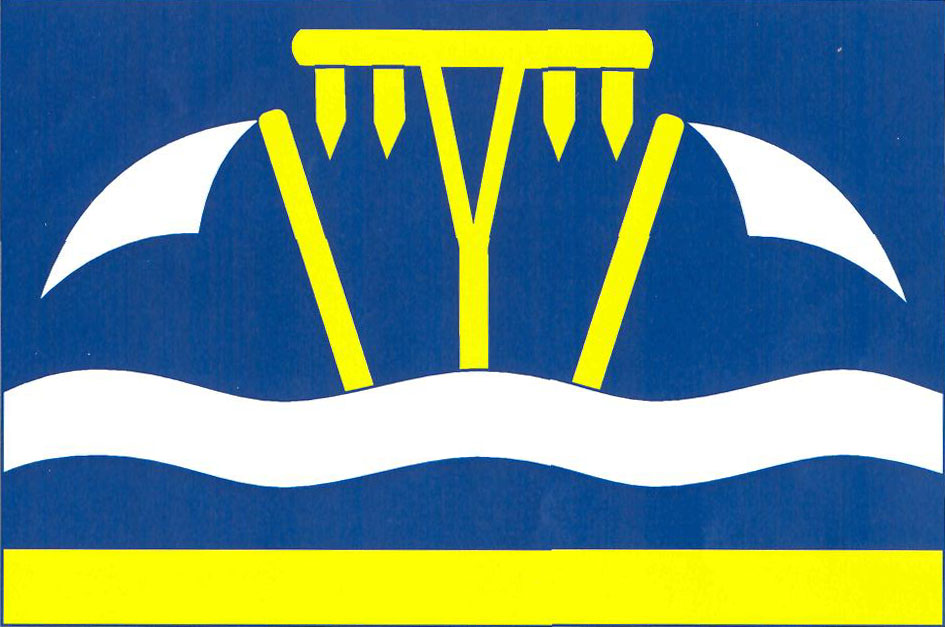
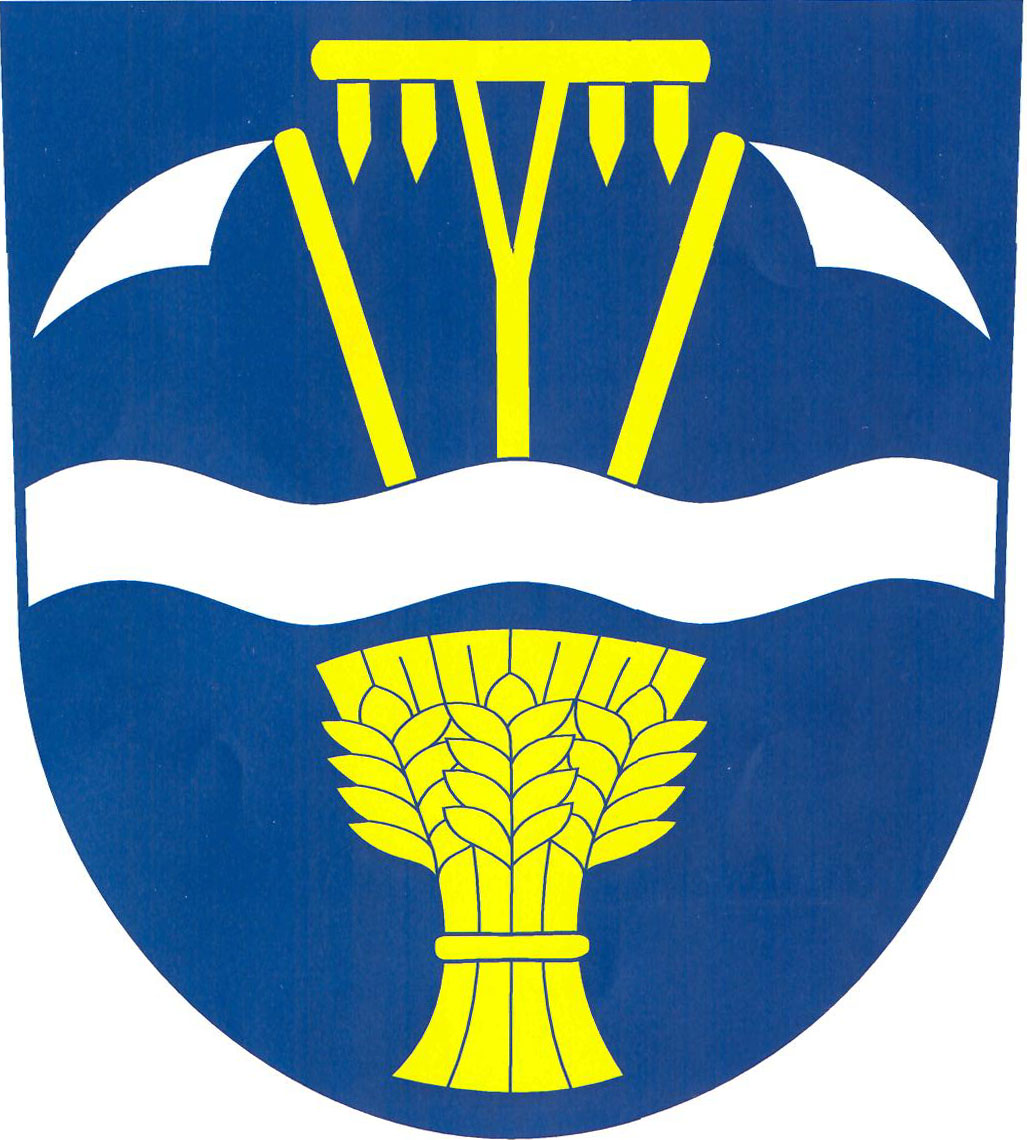
- Flag Coat of arms

- Location in the Czech Republic
- Coordinates: 49°35′26″N 15°23′34″E
- Country: Czech Republic
- Region: Vysočina
- District: Pelhřimov
- First mentioned: 1378

Area
  - Total: 11.27 km^{2} (4.35 sq mi)
- Elevation: 470 m (1,540 ft)

Population (2026-01-01)
  - Total: 483
  - Density: 42.9/km^{2} (111/sq mi)
- Time zone: UTC+1 (CET)
  - Summer (DST): UTC+2 (CEST)
- Postal code: 394 52
- Website: www.kejzlice.cz

Kejžlice is a municipality and village in Pelhřimov District in the Vysočina Region of the Czech Republic. It has about 500 inhabitants.

Kejžlice lies approximately 22 kilometres (14 mi) north-east of Pelhřimov, 26 km (16 mi) north-west of Jihlava, and 90 km (56 mi) south-east of Prague.

== Demographics ==
Historical population
Year	Pop.	±%
1869	720	—
1880	735	+2.1%
1890	710	−3.4%
1900	641	−9.7%
1910	670	+4.5%
1921	702	+4.8%
1930	685	−2.4%
1950	596	−13.0%
1961	577	−3.2%
1970	464	−19.6%
1980	372	−19.8%
1991	345	−7.3%
2001	328	−4.9%
2011	339	+3.4%
2021	433	+27.7%
Source: Censuses
