= Útěchovičky =

- Municipality
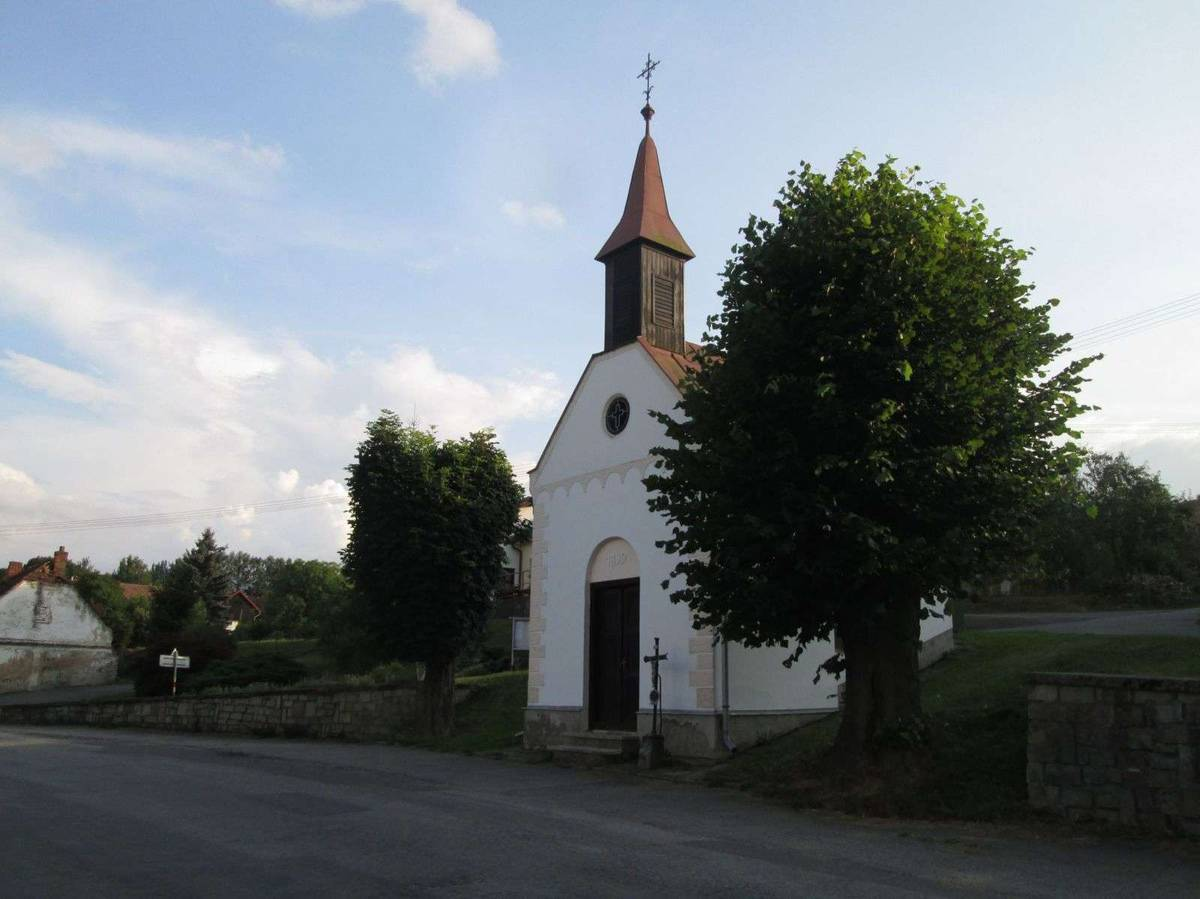
- Chapel of Saint Wenceslaus

- Location in the Czech Republic
- Coordinates: 49°27′38″N 15°5′59″E
- Country: Czech Republic
- Region: Vysočina
- District: Pelhřimov
- First mentioned: 1544

Area
  - Total: 4.06 km^{2} (1.57 sq mi)
- Elevation: 551 m (1,808 ft)

Population (2026-01-01)
  - Total: 71
  - Density: 17/km^{2} (45/sq mi)
- Time zone: UTC+1 (CET)
  - Summer (DST): UTC+2 (CEST)
- Postal code: 395 01
- Website: www.utechovicky.cz

Útěchovičky is a municipality and village in Pelhřimov District in the Vysočina Region of the Czech Republic. It has about 70 inhabitants.

Útěchovičky lies approximately 10 kilometres (6 mi) west of Pelhřimov, 37 km (23 mi) west of Jihlava, and 86 km (53 mi) south-east of Prague.

== Demographics ==
Historical population
Year	Pop.	±%
1869	235	—
1880	226	−3.8%
1890	223	−1.3%
1900	211	−5.4%
1910	196	−7.1%
1921	211	+7.7%
1930	199	−5.7%
1950	147	−26.1%
1961	128	−12.9%
1970	114	−10.9%
1980	102	−10.5%
1991	92	−9.8%
2001	77	−16.3%
2011	75	−2.6%
2021	65	−13.3%
Source: Censuses
