= Syrov =

- Municipality
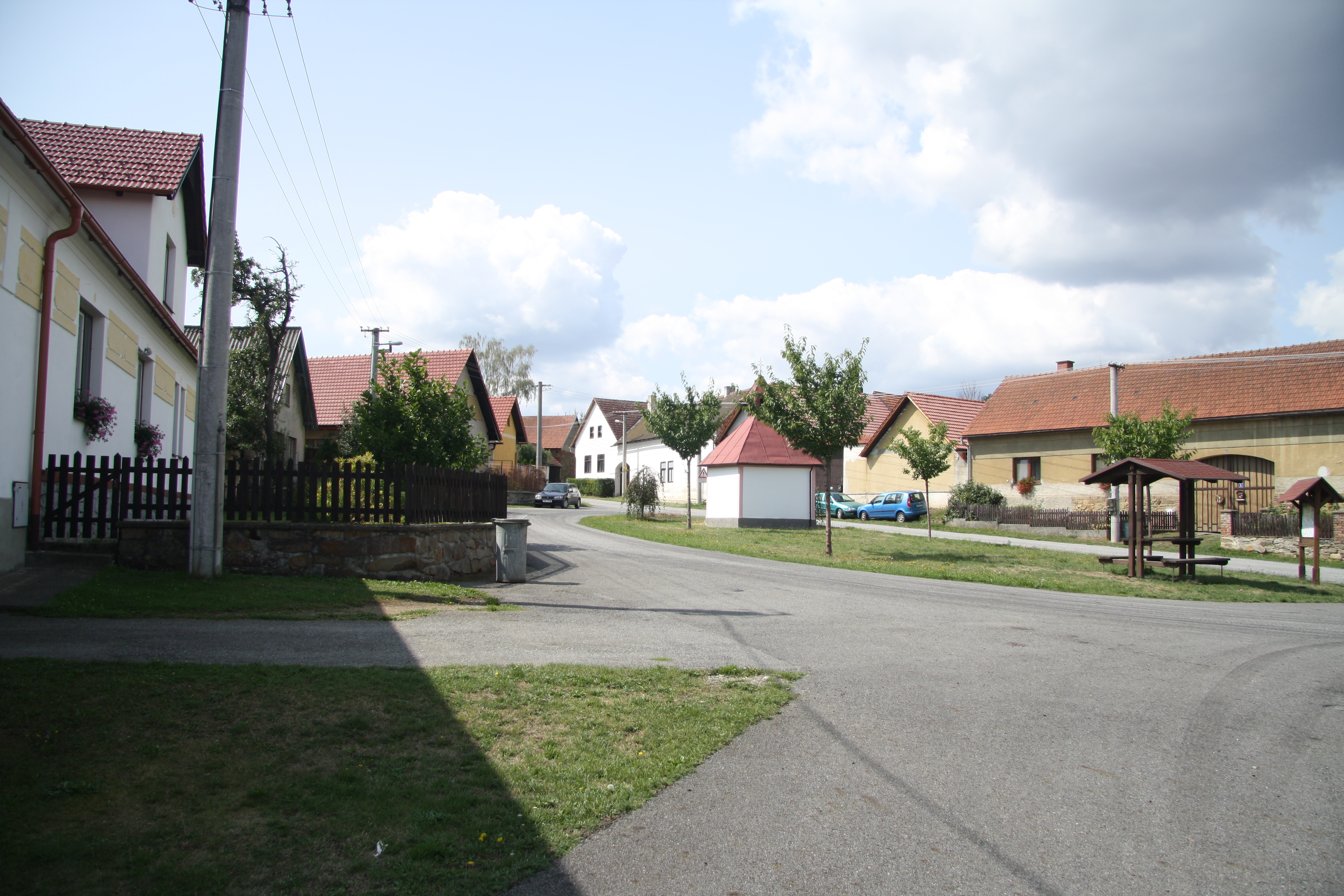
- Centre of Syrov

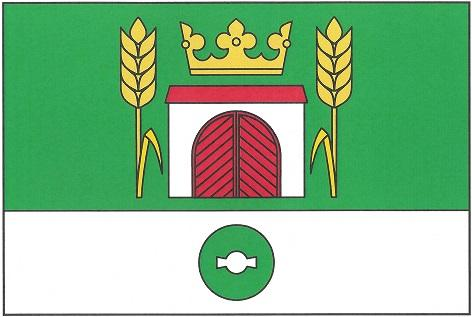
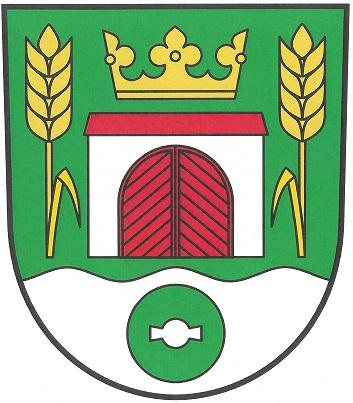
- Flag Coat of arms

- Location in the Czech Republic
- Coordinates: 49°34′41″N 15°10′40″E
- Country: Czech Republic
- Region: Vysočina
- District: Pelhřimov
- First mentioned: 1352

Area
  - Total: 4.70 km^{2} (1.81 sq mi)
- Elevation: 443 m (1,453 ft)

Population (2026-01-01)
  - Total: 60
  - Density: 13/km^{2} (33/sq mi)
- Time zone: UTC+1 (CET)
  - Summer (DST): UTC+2 (CEST)
- Postal code: 396 01
- Website: www.obecsyrov.cz

Syrov is a municipality and village in Pelhřimov District in the Vysočina Region of the Czech Republic. It has about 60 inhabitants.

Syrov lies approximately 17 kilometres (11 mi) north of Pelhřimov, 37 km (23 mi) north-west of Jihlava, and 78 km (48 mi) south-east of Prague.

== Demographics ==
Historical population
Year	Pop.	±%
1869	239	—
1880	223	−6.7%
1890	208	−6.7%
1900	236	+13.5%
1910	247	+4.7%
1921	246	−0.4%
1930	216	−12.2%
1950	171	−20.8%
1961	149	−12.9%
1970	101	−32.2%
1980	75	−25.7%
1991	66	−12.0%
2001	55	−16.7%
2011	57	+3.6%
2021	49	−14.0%
Source: Censuses
