= Mysletín =

- Municipality
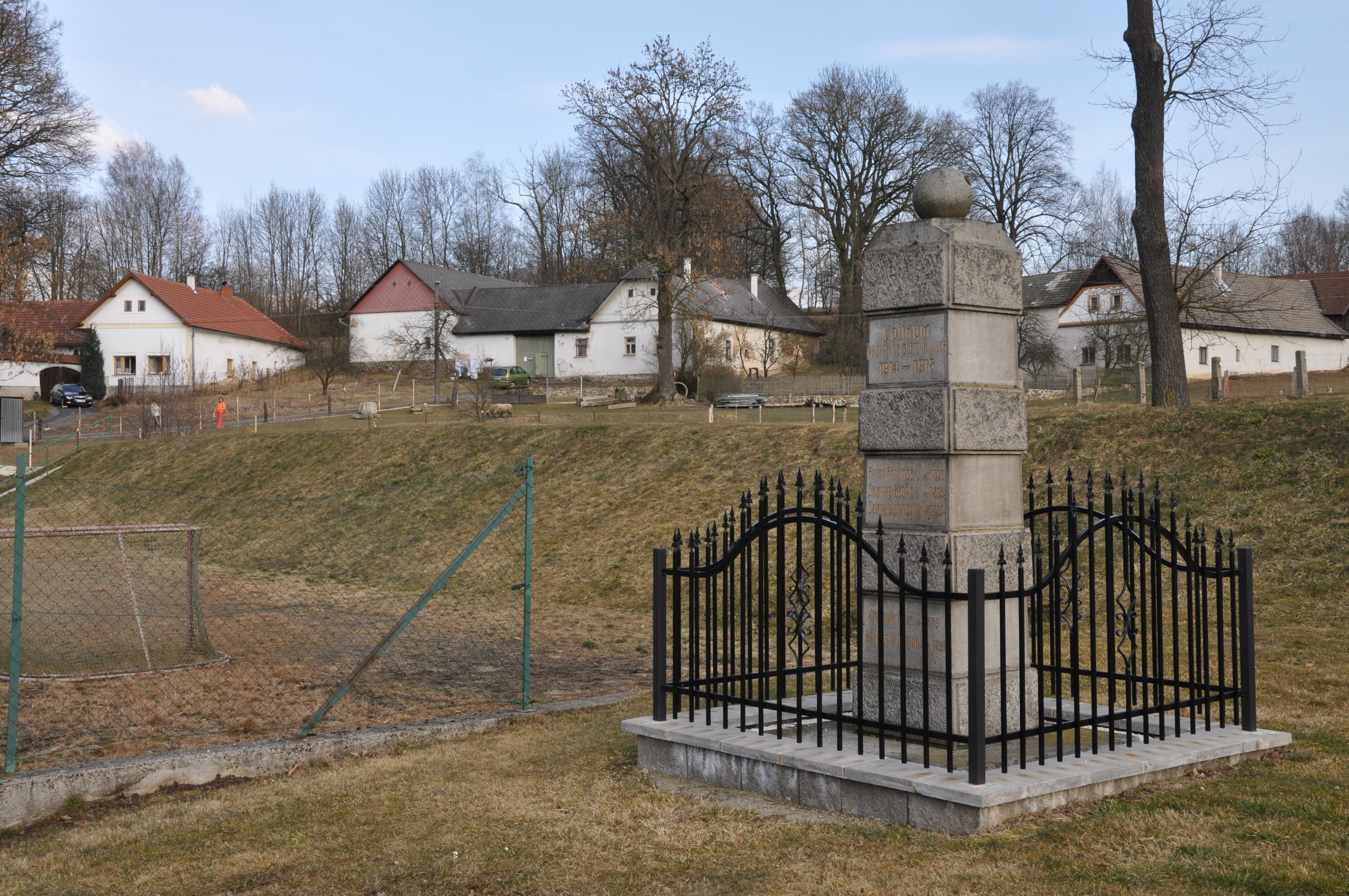
- Monument to the victims of World War I

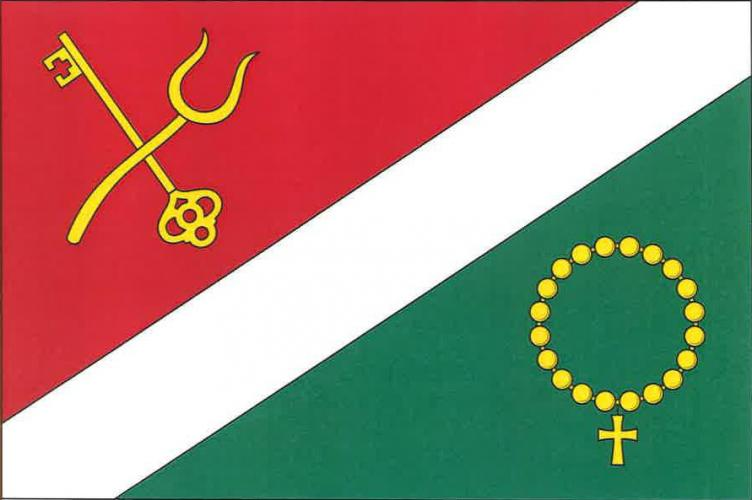
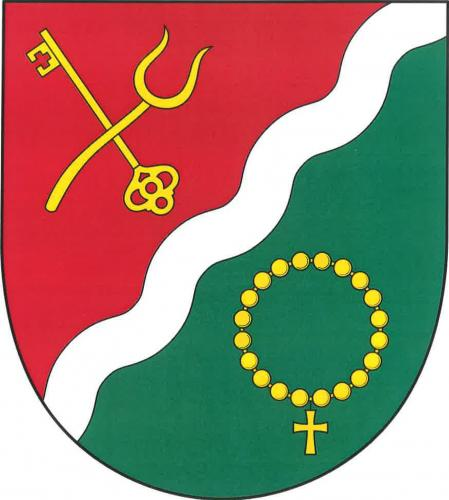
- Flag Coat of arms

- Location in the Czech Republic
- Coordinates: 49°28′36″N 15°22′6″E
- Country: Czech Republic
- Region: Vysočina
- District: Pelhřimov
- First mentioned: 1226

Area
  - Total: 4.15 km^{2} (1.60 sq mi)
- Elevation: 557 m (1,827 ft)

Population (2026-01-01)
  - Total: 117
  - Density: 28.2/km^{2} (73.0/sq mi)
- Time zone: UTC+1 (CET)
  - Summer (DST): UTC+2 (CEST)
- Postal code: 396 01
- Website: www.mysletin.cz

Mysletín is a municipality and village in Pelhřimov District in the Vysočina Region of the Czech Republic. It has about 100 inhabitants.

Mysletín lies approximately 13 kilometres (8 mi) north-east of Pelhřimov, 18 km (11 mi) north-west of Jihlava, and 97 km (60 mi) south-east of Prague.

== Demographics ==
Historical population
Year	Pop.	±%
1869	289	—
1880	287	−0.7%
1890	274	−4.5%
1900	239	−12.8%
1910	242	+1.3%
1921	220	−9.1%
1930	192	−12.7%
1950	143	−25.5%
1961	101	−29.4%
1970	113	+11.9%
1980	102	−9.7%
1991	85	−16.7%
2001	104	+22.4%
2011	108	+3.8%
2021	113	+4.6%
Source: Censuses
