= Staré Bříště =

- Municipality
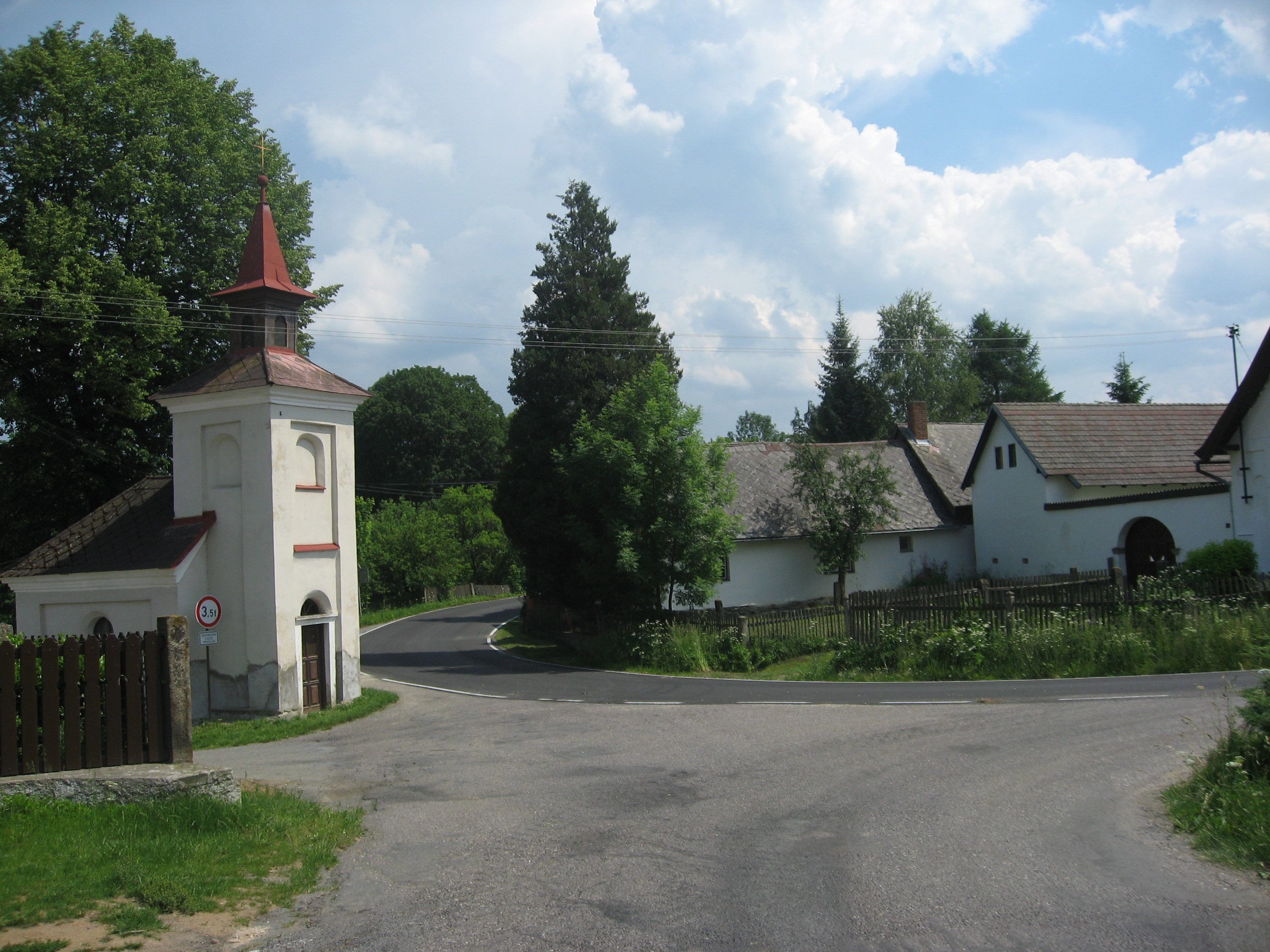
- Chapel of Saint John of Nepomuk

- Location in the Czech Republic
- Coordinates: 49°29′27″N 15°21′45″E
- Country: Czech Republic
- Region: Vysočina
- District: Pelhřimov
- First mentioned: 1437

Area
  - Total: 5.31 km^{2} (2.05 sq mi)
- Elevation: 529 m (1,736 ft)

Population (2026-01-01)
  - Total: 84
  - Density: 16/km^{2} (41/sq mi)
- Time zone: UTC+1 (CET)
  - Summer (DST): UTC+2 (CEST)
- Postal code: 396 01
- Website: www.starebriste.cz

Staré Bříště is a municipality and village in Pelhřimov District in the Vysočina Region of the Czech Republic. It has about 80 inhabitants.

Staré Bříště lies approximately 13 kilometres (8 mi) north-east of Pelhřimov, 20 km (12 mi) north-west of Jihlava, and 95 km (59 mi) south-east of Prague.

== Administrative division ==
Staré Bříště consists of two municipal parts (in brackets population according to the 2021 census):

- Staré Bříště (59)
- Vlčí Hory (13)

== Demographics ==
Historical population
Year	Pop.	±%
1869	349	—
1880	315	−9.7%
1890	331	+5.1%
1900	290	−12.4%
1910	252	−13.1%
1921	265	+5.2%
1930	233	−12.1%
1950	138	−40.8%
1961	140	+1.4%
1970	102	−27.1%
1980	64	−37.3%
1991	62	−3.1%
2001	53	−14.5%
2011	53	+0.0%
2021	72	+35.8%
Source: Censuses
