= Želivka =

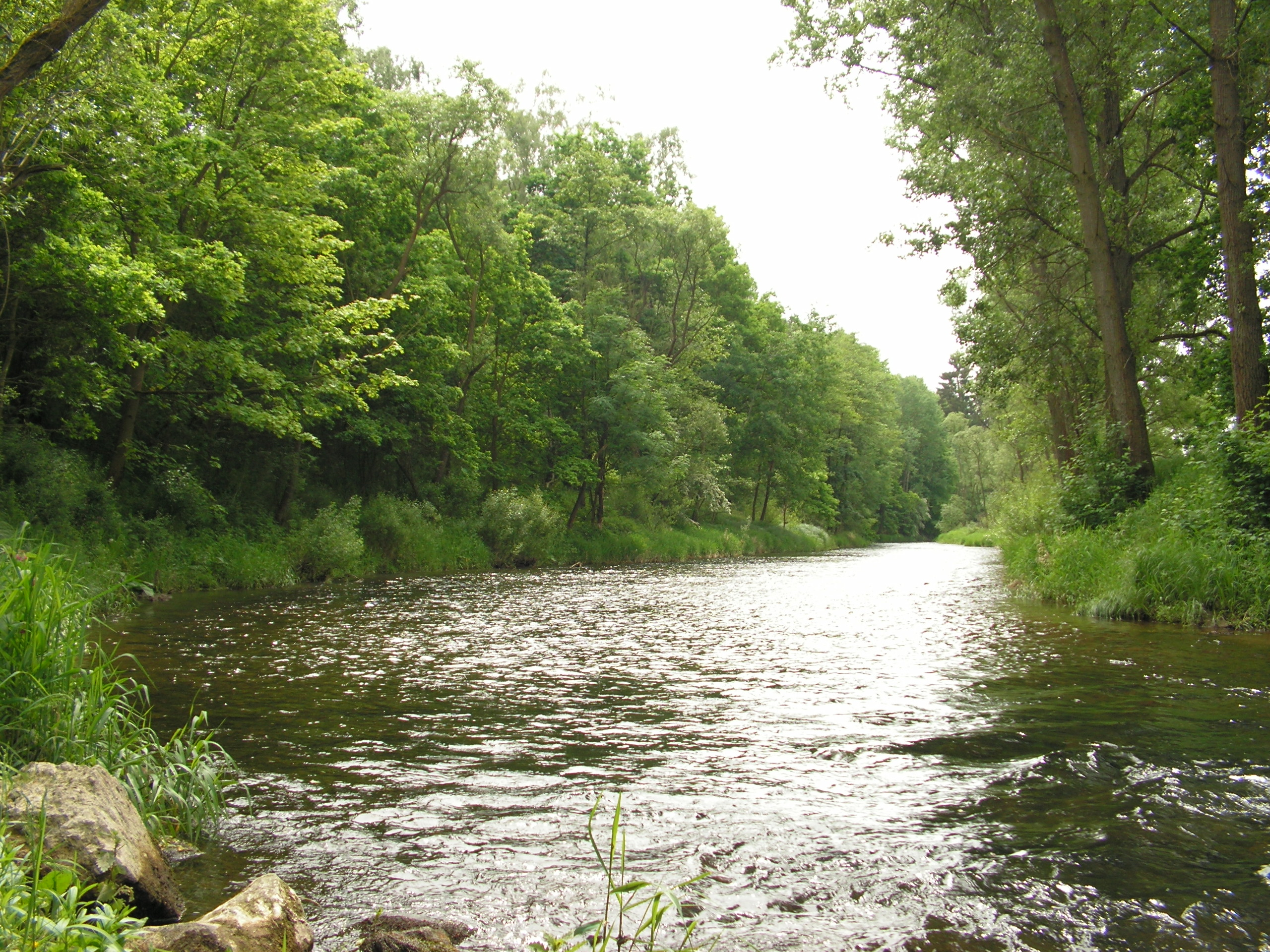
- The Želivka near the estuary

Location
- Country: Czech Republic
- Regions: Vysočina; South Bohemian

Physical characteristics
- Source
  - location: Mezná, Křemešník Highlands
  - coordinates: 49°19′58″N 15°12′36″E
  - elevation: 677 m (2,221 ft)
- Mouth
  - location: Sázava
  - coordinates: 49°44′27″N 15°3′27″E
  - elevation: 318 m (1,043 ft)
- Length: 103.9 km (64.6 mi)
- Basin size: 1,188.4 km^{2} (458.8 sq mi)
- Discharge
  - average: 3.91 m^{3}/s (138 cu ft/s) near estuary

Basin features
- Progression: Sázava→ Vltava→ Elbe→ North Sea

The Želivka (Czech pronunciation: [ˈʒɛlɪfka]; on the upper course called Hejlovka) is a river in the Czech Republic, a left tributary of the Sázava River. It flows through the Vysočina and South Bohemian regions. It is 103.9 km (64.6 mi) long, making it the 20th longest river in the Czech Republic.

== Etymology ==
The river is named after the monastery and the settlement of Želiv.

== Characteristic ==
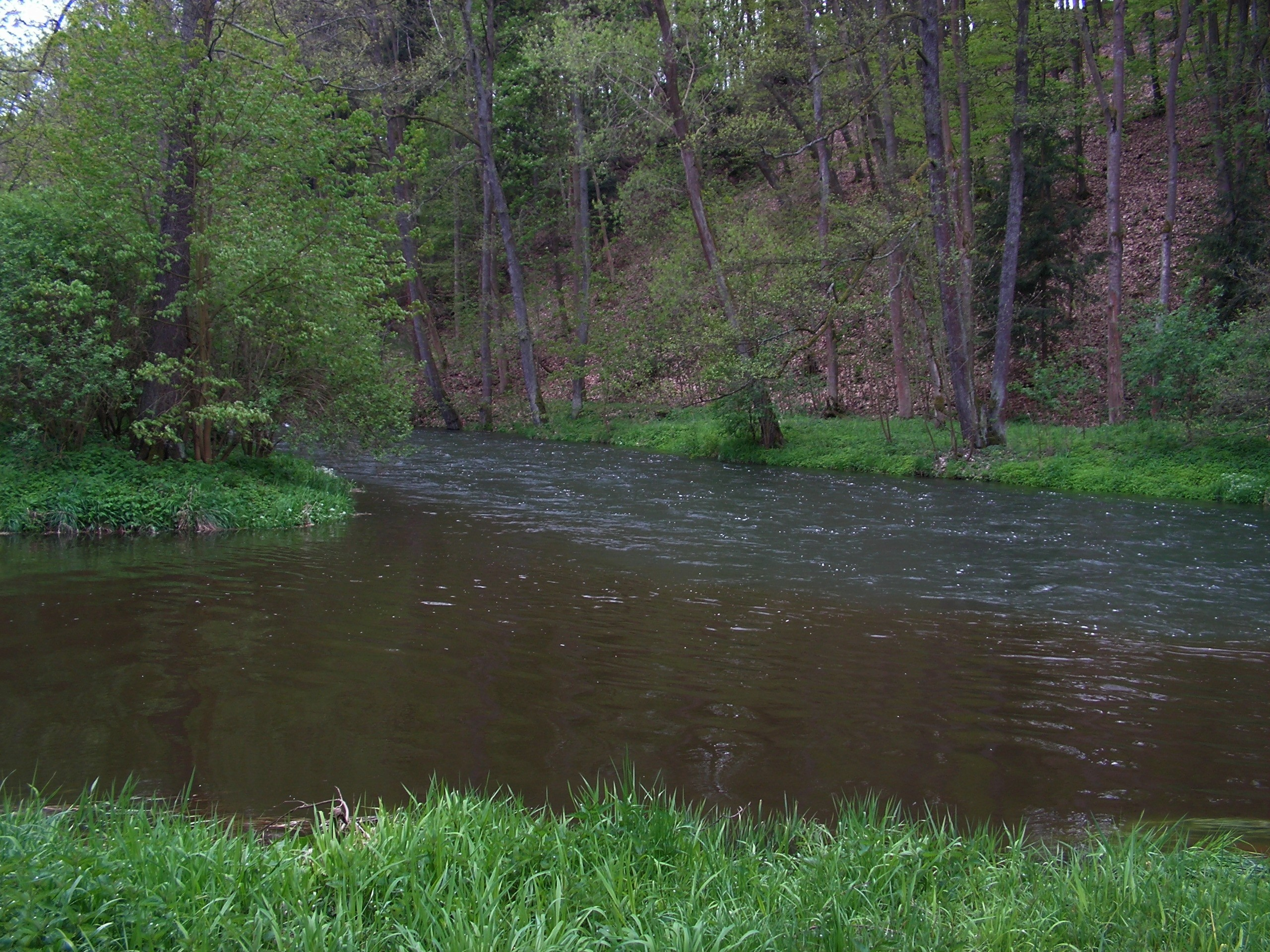
Confluence of the Želivka and Trnava

The Želivka originates in the territory of Mezná in the Křemešník Highlands at an elevation of 677 m (2,221 ft) and flows to Soutice, where it enters the Sázava River at an elevation of 318 m (1,043 ft). Above the Sedlice Reservoir it bears the name Hejlovka. It is 103.9 km (64.6 mi) long, which makes it the 20th longest river in the Czech Republic. Its drainage basin has an area of 1,188.4 km^{2} (458.8 sq mi).

The longest tributaries of the Želivka are:

Tributary	Length (km)	River km	Side
Trnava	56.3	52.0	left
Martinický potok	38.7	36.7	left
Bělá	25.1	72.9	right
Sedlický potok	23.6	7.3	left
Jankovský potok	22.8	64.4	right
Cerekvický potok	16.9	89.4	left
Blažejovický potok	14.1	29.1	right

== Course ==
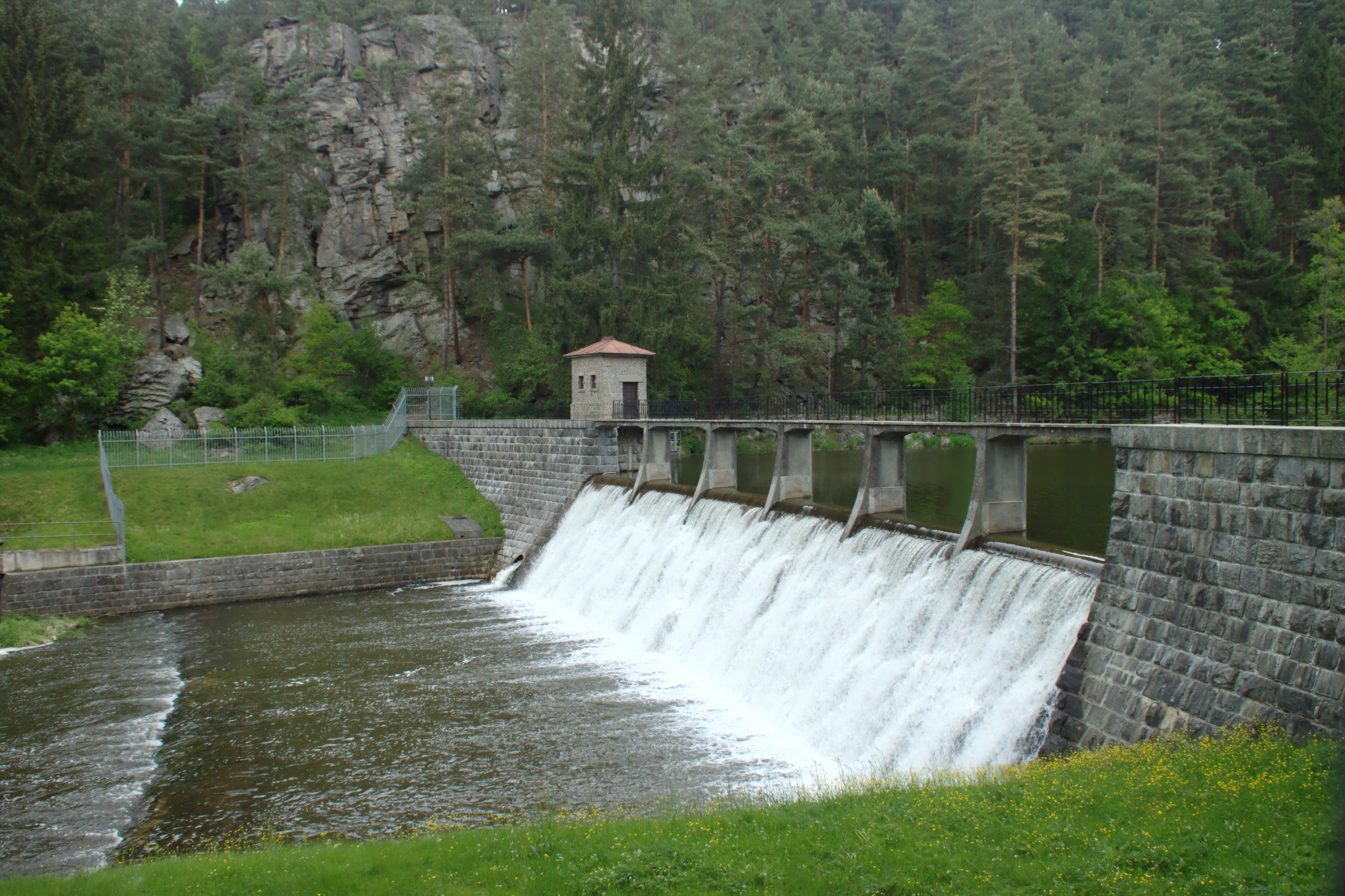
Vřesník Reservoir

Despite its length, there are no large settlements on the Želivka. The most notable settlement on the river is Želiv, therefore its name. The river also flows along the border of the town of Pelhřimov. The river flows past the following municipalities (including the shore of Švihov Reservoir): Mezná, Božejov, Ústrašín, Ondřejov, Dubovice, Pelhřimov, Malý Beranov, Krasíkovice, Kojčice, Svépravice, Sedlice, Želiv, Koberovice, Vojslavice, Píšť, Ježov, Kožlí, Hněvkovice, Bernartice, Hulice, Zruč nad Sázavou and Soutice.

== Bodies of water ==
There are 136 bodies of water larger than 1 ha in the basin area. The largest of them is the Švihov Reservoir with an area of 1,602 ha (3,960 acres). Other reservoirs built on the river are Sedlice and Vřesník.

== Economy ==
The Švihov Reservoir provides drinking water supply for most of the Central Bohemian Region and the city of Prague. The Sedlice Reservoir, as well as the Trnávka and Němčice reservoirs on the tributaries of the Želivka, were built to capture alluvium and sediments before these watercourses reach the Švihov Reservoir.

== See also ==
- Želivka Water Tunnel
