= Vojslavice =

- Municipality
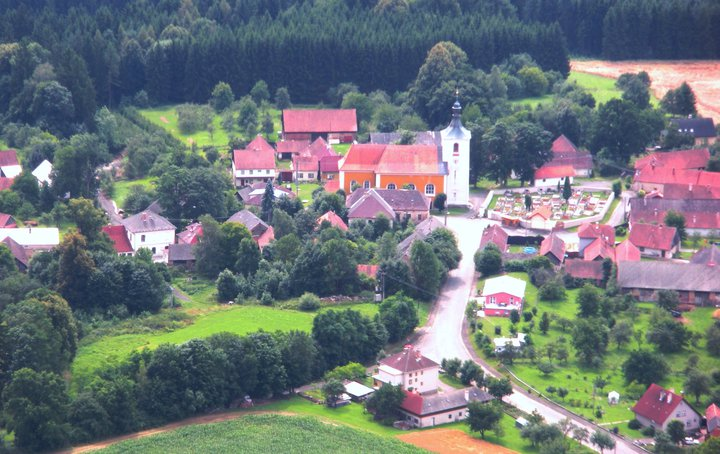
- General view

- Location in the Czech Republic
- Coordinates: 49°35′35″N 15°13′44″E
- Country: Czech Republic
- Region: Vysočina
- District: Pelhřimov
- First mentioned: 1318

Area
  - Total: 4.83 km^{2} (1.86 sq mi)
- Elevation: 428 m (1,404 ft)

Population (2026-01-01)
  - Total: 103
  - Density: 21.3/km^{2} (55.2/sq mi)
- Time zone: UTC+1 (CET)
  - Summer (DST): UTC+2 (CEST)
- Postal code: 396 01
- Website: www.vojslavice.cz

Vojslavice is a municipality and village in Pelhřimov District in the Vysočina Region of the Czech Republic. It has about 100 inhabitants.

== Etymology ==
The name is derived from the personal name Vojslav, meaning "the village of Vojslav's people".

== Geography ==
Vojslavice is located about 18 kilometres (11 mi) north of Pelhřimov and 33 km (21 mi) northwest of Jihlava. It lies in the Křemešník Highlands. The highest point is at 487 m (1,598 ft) above sea level. The municipality is situated in a meander of the Želivka River, on the shore of the Švihov Reservoir built on the Želivka.

== History ==
The first written mention of Vojslavice is from 1318.

== Demographics ==
Historical population

Year	Pop.	±%
1869	331	—
1880	325	−1.8%
1890	323	−0.6%
1900	296	−8.4%
1910	309	+4.4%

Year	Pop.	±%
1921	322	+4.2%
1930	267	−17.1%
1950	209	−21.7%
1961	195	−6.7%
1970	167	−14.4%

Year	Pop.	±%
1980	146	−12.6%
1991	123	−15.8%
2001	109	−11.4%
2011	81	−25.7%
2021	85	+4.9%

Source: Censuses

== Transport ==
The D1 motorway from Prague to Brno runs through the municipality.

== Sights ==
The main landmark of Vojslavice is the Church of the Assumption of the Virgin Mary. It is a simple pilgrimage church built on the site of an old medieval church. It was built in 1670 and modified in 1721–1723.
