= List of lakes of the Czech Republic =

This is a list of lakes of the Czech Republic, larger than 1 ha, sorted by area.

Lake	District	Area ha	Depth m	Altitude m	River (Drainage basin)
Černé jezero	Klatovy	18.4	40.6	1,008	Černý potok (Úhlava)
Kamencové jezero	Chomutov	16.3	3.3	337	(Bílina)
Čertovo jezero	Klatovy	10.3	37	1,030	Jezerní potok (Železný potok)
Plešné jezero	Prachatice	7.48	18.3	1,090	Jezerní potok (Vltava – Lipno Dam)
Odlezelské jezero	Plzeň-North	4.5	6.7	413	Mladotický potok (Střela)
Prášilské jezero	Klatovy	3.7	15	1,080	Jezerní potok (Prášilský potok – Křemelná)
Laka	Klatovy	2.53	3.9	1,096	Jezerní potok (Černý potok – Křemelná)
Hromnické jezírko	Plzeň-North	~2	18	337	(Třemošná)
Chalupské jezírko	Prachatice	1.3	7	908	(Teplá Vltava)

== See also ==
- List of dams and reservoirs in the Czech Republic
- List of ponds of the Czech Republic
