= List of dams and reservoirs in the Czech Republic =

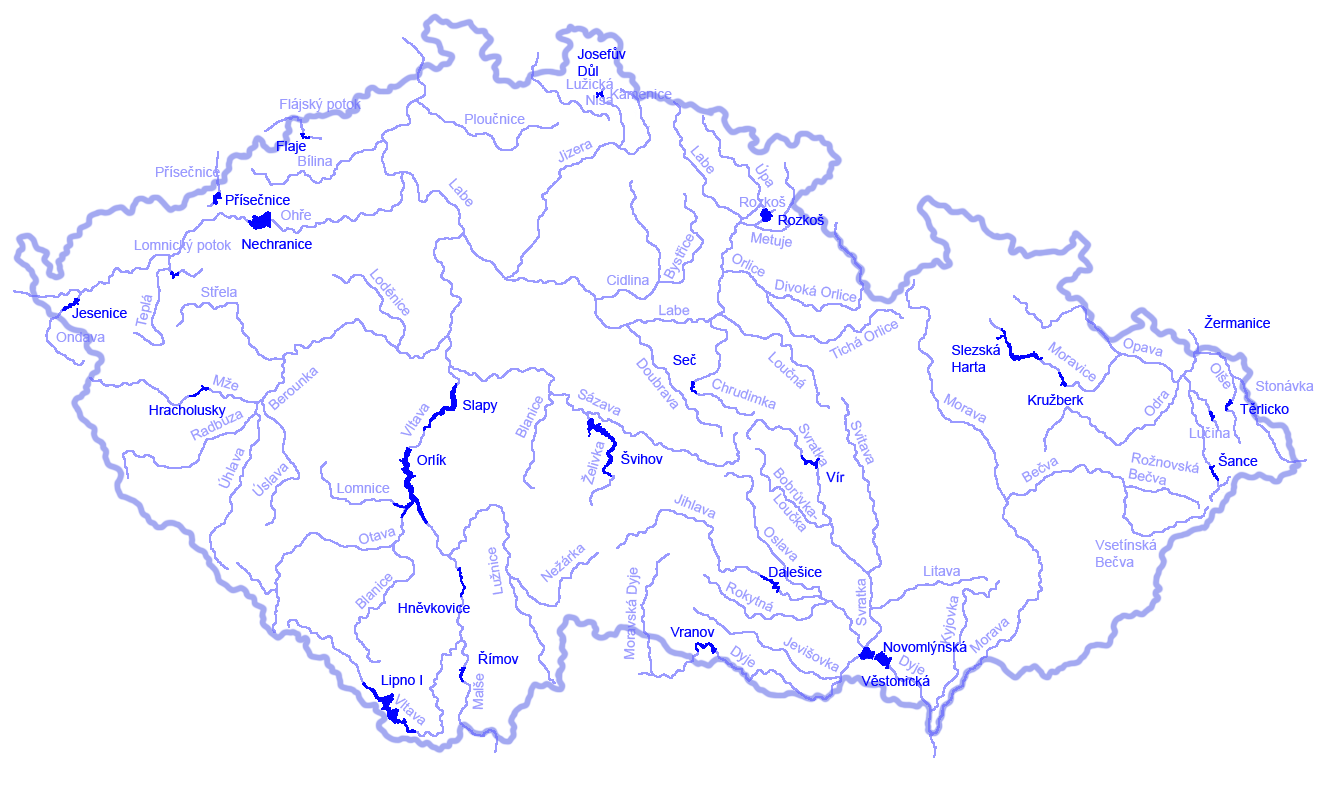
Map of the biggest reservoirs of the Czech Republic

This is a list of reservoirs in the Czech Republic, larger than 2 square kilometres (0.77 sq mi).

Reservoir	District	Area (km²)	Depth (m)	River
Lipno	Český Krumlov, Prachatice	48.7	22	Vltava
Orlík	Písek, Příbram	27.32	74	Vltava
Nové Mlýny III	Břeclav	16.68	7.8	Thaya
Švihov	Kutná Hora, Benešov, Havlíčkův Brod, Pelhřimov	16.02	55.7	Želivka
Slapy	Prague-West, Benešov, Příbram	13.92	58	Vltava
Nechranice	Chomutov	13.38	46	Ohře
Nové Mlýny II	Břeclav	10.31	5.3	Thaya
Rozkoš	Náchod	10.01	17	Rozkoš
Slezská Harta	Bruntál	8.72	61	Moravice
Vranov	Znojmo	7.65	58	Thaya
Jesenice	Cheb	7.46	18	Odrava
Nové Mlýny I	Břeclav	5.28	4.3	Thaya
Dalešice	Třebíč	4.8	85.5	Jihlava
Hracholusky	Tachov, Plzeň-North	4.7	31	Mže
Skalka	Cheb	3.85	14	Ohře
Přísečnice	Chomutov	3.64	47	Přísečnice
Šance	Frýdek-Místek	3.36	62.5	Ostravice
Hněvkovice	České Budějovice	3.21	17	Vltava
Střekov	Ústí nad Labem	3.1	13	Elbe
Kružberk	Opava	2.87	32	Moravice
Těrlicko	Karviná	2.68	23	Stonávka
Brno	Brno-City	2.59	19	Svratka
Vrané	Prague-West	2.51	10	Vltava
Žermanice	Frýdek-Místek	2.48	28	Lučina
Vír I	Žďár nad Sázavou	2.24	65.6	Svratka
Seč I	Havlíčkův Brod, Chrudim	2.2	34	Chrudimka
Římov	České Budějovice, Český Krumov	2.11	43	Malše

== See also ==
- List of lakes in the Czech Republic
- List of ponds in the Czech Republic
