= Píšť =

Píšť may refer to places in the Czech Republic:

- Píšť (Opava District), a municipality and village in the Moravian-Silesian Region
- Píšť (Pelhřimov District), a municipality and village in the Vysočina Region
