= Želivka Water Tunnel =

Coordinates: 49°43′24″N 15°4′48″E

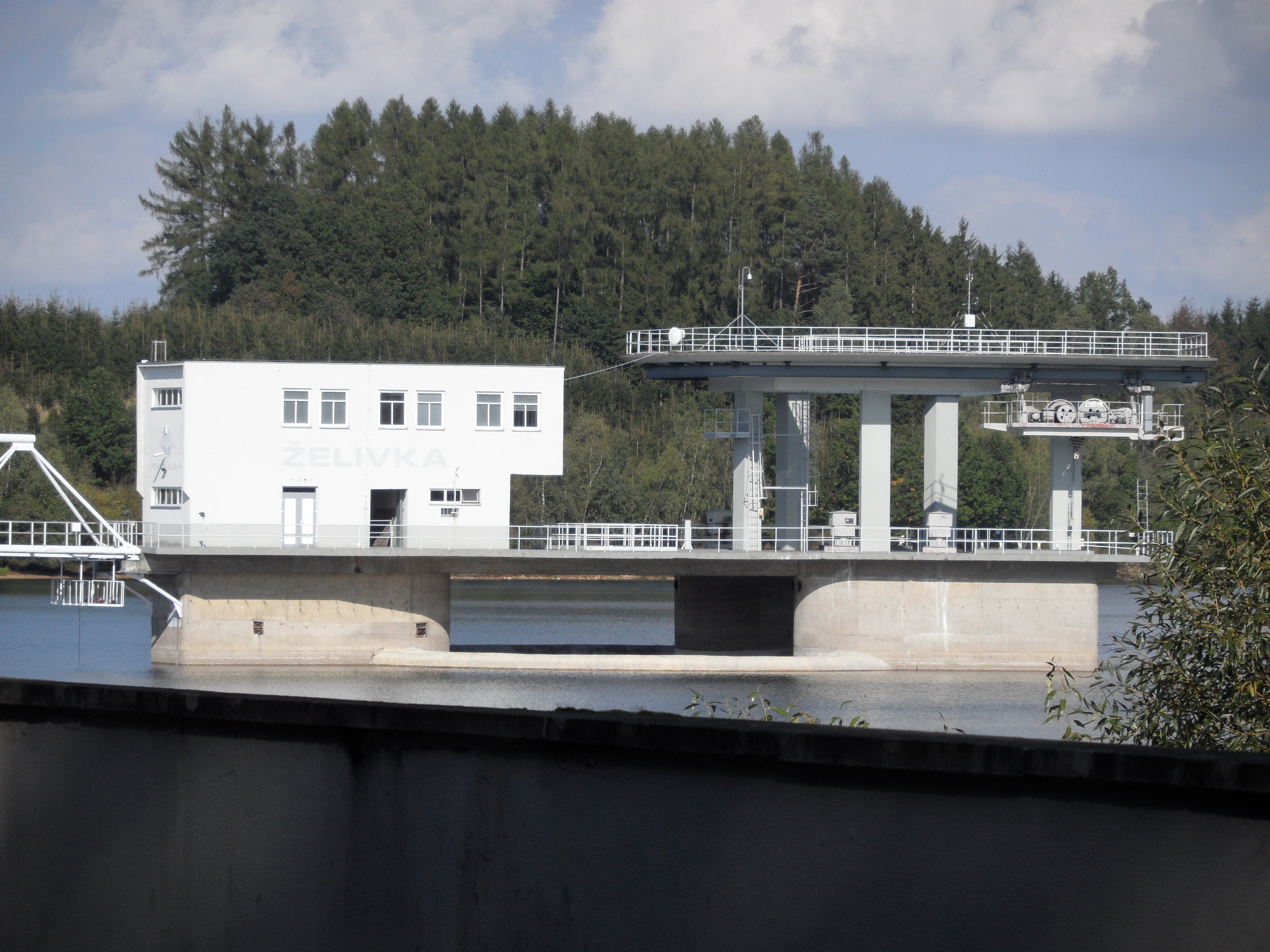

Operation
- Opened: 1972

Technical
- Length: 51.97 kilometres (32.29 mi)

Želivka Water Tunnel (Czech: Vodní tunel Želivka) is a water tunnel in the Central Bohemian Region of the Czech Republic. At 51.97 kilometres long, it is the sixth longest water tunnel in the world. It was finished in 1972.

== History ==
In 1965, the first phase of construction of a water supply line from the Želivka began far away from Prague. Soon, a 51 kilometres long tunnel was being cut to bring clean water from the treatment plant in Nesměřice to Jesenice. Meanwhile, there already were two lines leading from the water tank in Jesenice, one going north-west to Prague-Libuš, Novodvorská street and further, the second going to Prague-Chodov, Hostivař and further. On 2 April 1967, dredgers and bulldozers started digging trenches for three parallel lines in Chodov. The water was supposed to be moving via gravity feed, which is why everything that was in the way of the best route had to go.
