= Mezná (Pelhřimov District) =

- Municipality
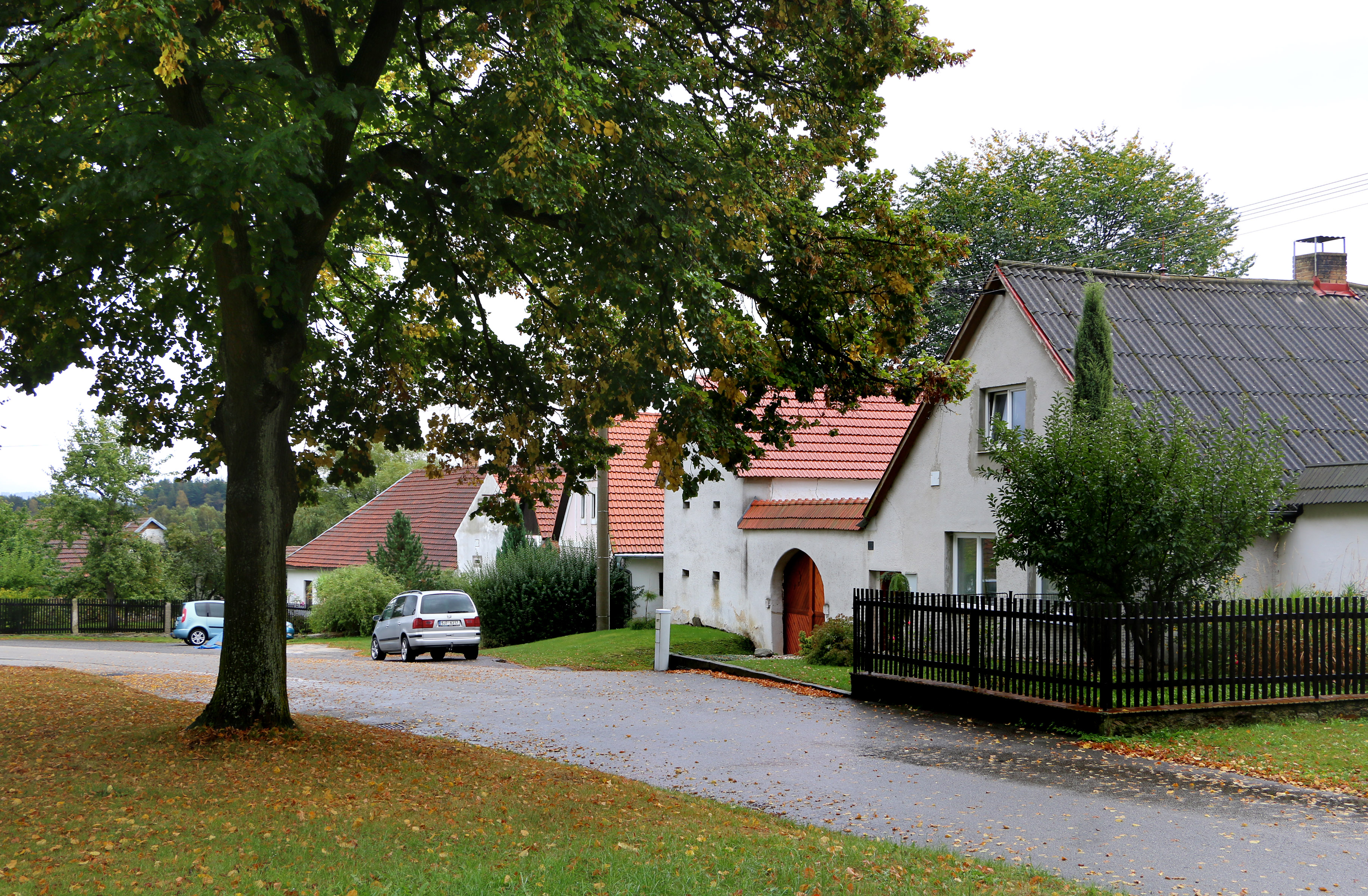
- Centre of Mezná

- Location in the Czech Republic
- Coordinates: 49°20′50″N 15°12′41″E
- Country: Czech Republic
- Region: Vysočina
- District: Pelhřimov
- First mentioned: 1385

Area
  - Total: 8.24 km^{2} (3.18 sq mi)
- Elevation: 636 m (2,087 ft)

Population (2026-01-01)
  - Total: 167
  - Density: 20.3/km^{2} (52.5/sq mi)
- Time zone: UTC+1 (CET)
  - Summer (DST): UTC+2 (CEST)
- Postal code: 393 01
- Website: www.mezna.cz

Mezná is a municipality and village in Pelhřimov District in the Vysočina Region of the Czech Republic. It has about 200 inhabitants.

== Administrative division ==
Mezná consists of two municipal parts (in brackets population according to the 2021 census):

- Mezná (98)
- Vratišov (42)

== Etymology ==
The name Mezná is an adjective derived from the Czech word mez ('border'). The village was probably founded near the border of some estate.

== Geography ==
Mezná is located about 9 kilometres (6 mi) south of Pelhřimov and 27 km (17 mi) west of Jihlava. It lies in the Křemešník Highlands. The highest point is the hill Bukový kopec at 703 m (2,306 ft) above sea level. The Želivka River (called Hejlovka on the upper course) originates in the municipal territory, on the northern slopes of Bukový kopec. The Bělá Stream flows along the eastern municipal border and together with its nameless tributary, they supply several small fishponds located in the municipality.

== History ==
The first written mention of Mezná is from 1385.

== Demographics ==
Historical population

Year	Pop.	±%
1869	418	—
1880	440	+5.3%
1890	447	+1.6%
1900	428	−4.3%
1910	395	−7.7%

Year	Pop.	±%
1921	383	−3.0%
1930	337	−12.0%
1950	224	−33.5%
1961	245	+9.4%
1970	183	−25.3%

Year	Pop.	±%
1980	159	−13.1%
1991	126	−20.8%
2001	119	−5.6%
2011	134	+12.6%
2021	140	+4.5%

Source: Censuses

== Transport ==
There are no railways or major roads passing through the municipality.

== Sights ==
Among the protected cultural monuments in the municipality are two Baroque column shrines from the years 1742 and 1769, and a Gothic memorial stone.
