= Píšť (Pelhřimov District) =

- Municipality
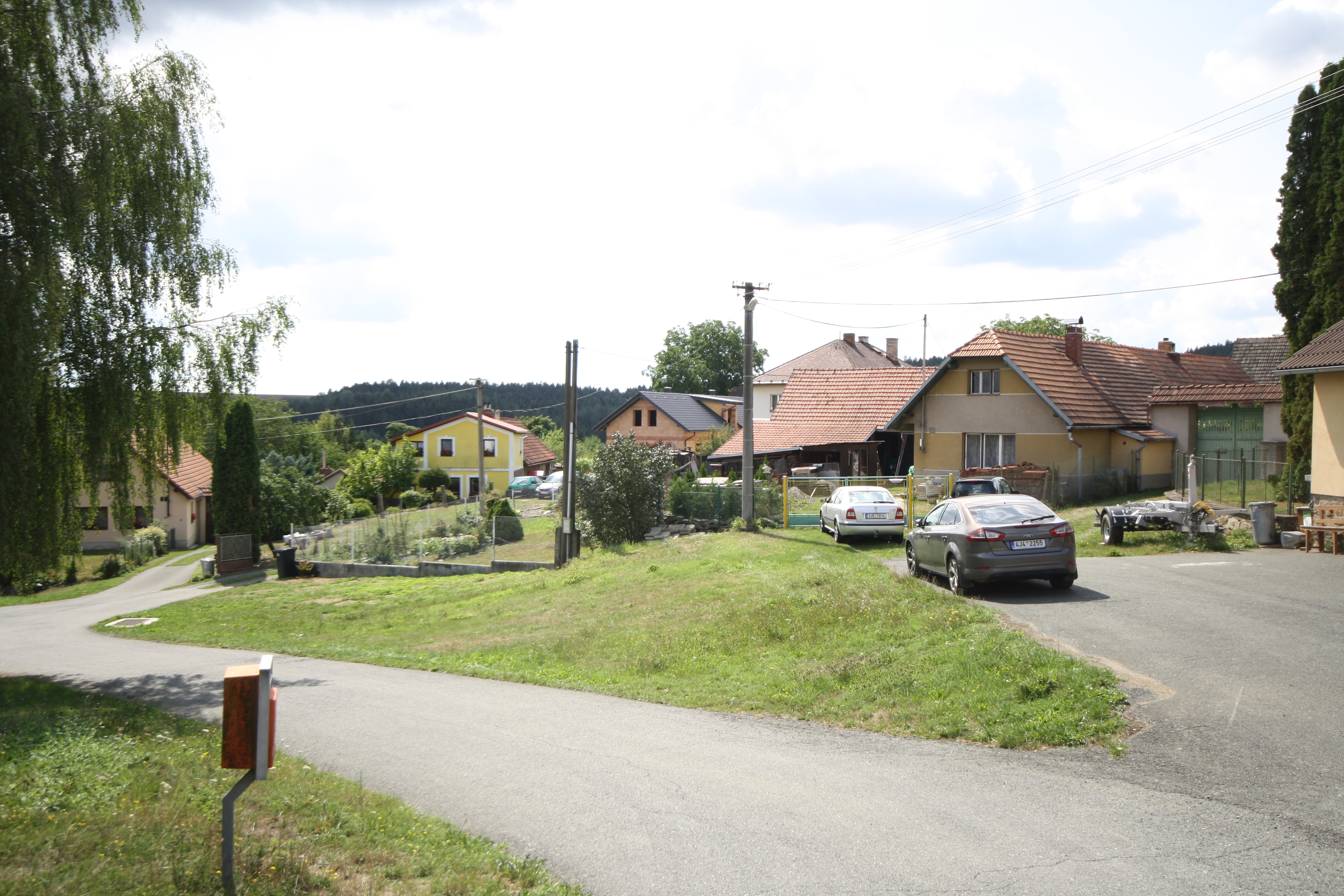
- Centre of Píšť

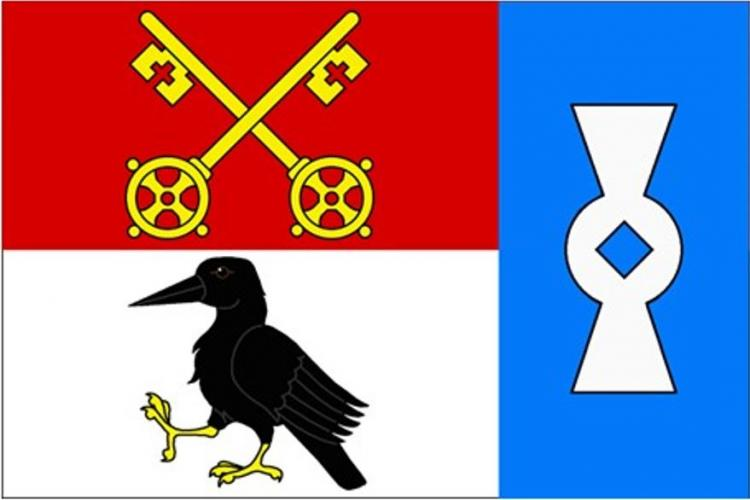
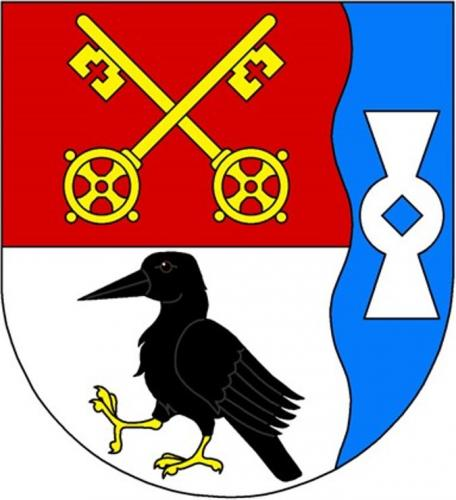
- Flag Coat of arms

- Location in the Czech Republic
- Coordinates: 49°36′6″N 15°12′12″E
- Country: Czech Republic
- Region: Vysočina
- District: Pelhřimov
- First mentioned: 1352

Area
  - Total: 5.66 km^{2} (2.19 sq mi)
- Elevation: 452 m (1,483 ft)

Population (2026-01-01)
  - Total: 77
  - Density: 14/km^{2} (35/sq mi)
- Time zone: UTC+1 (CET)
  - Summer (DST): UTC+2 (CEST)
- Postal code: 396 01
- Website: obecpist.cz

Píšť (German: Pischt) is a municipality and village in Pelhřimov District in the Vysočina Region of the Czech Republic. It has about 80 inhabitants.

== Administrative division ==
Píšť consists of two municipal parts (in brackets population according to the 2021 census):

- Píšť (45)
- Vranice (34)

== Etymology ==
The initial name of Píšť was Piešče. The name was derived either from the personal name Piest or Pěšek.

== Geography ==
Píšť is located about 19 kilometres (12 mi) north of Pelhřimov and 35 km (22 mi) northwest of Jihlava. It lies in the Křemešník Highlands. The highest point is the hill Hrušovec at 484 m (1,588 ft) above sea level. The municipality is situated on the left shore of the Švihov Reservoir, built on the Želivka River.

== History ==
The first written mention of Píšť is from 1352, when the village was owned by the Vyšehrad Chapter. In 1436, Píšť was acquired by the Trčka of Lípa family. In the 1540, they sold the village to the Střela of Rokyce family. The village then frequently changed owners.

== Demographics ==
Historical population

Year	Pop.	±%
1869	339	—
1880	355	+4.7%
1890	372	+4.8%
1900	369	−0.8%
1910	397	+7.6%

Year	Pop.	±%
1921	371	−6.5%
1930	329	−11.3%
1950	265	−19.5%
1961	268	+1.1%
1970	203	−24.3%

Year	Pop.	±%
1980	155	−23.6%
1991	117	−24.5%
2001	90	−23.1%
2011	69	−23.3%
2021	79	+14.5%

Source: Censuses

== Transport ==
The D1 motorway from Prague to Brno runs through the southern part of the municipality.

== Sights ==
There are no protected cultural monuments in the municipality.
