= Kožlí (Havlíčkův Brod District) =

- Municipality
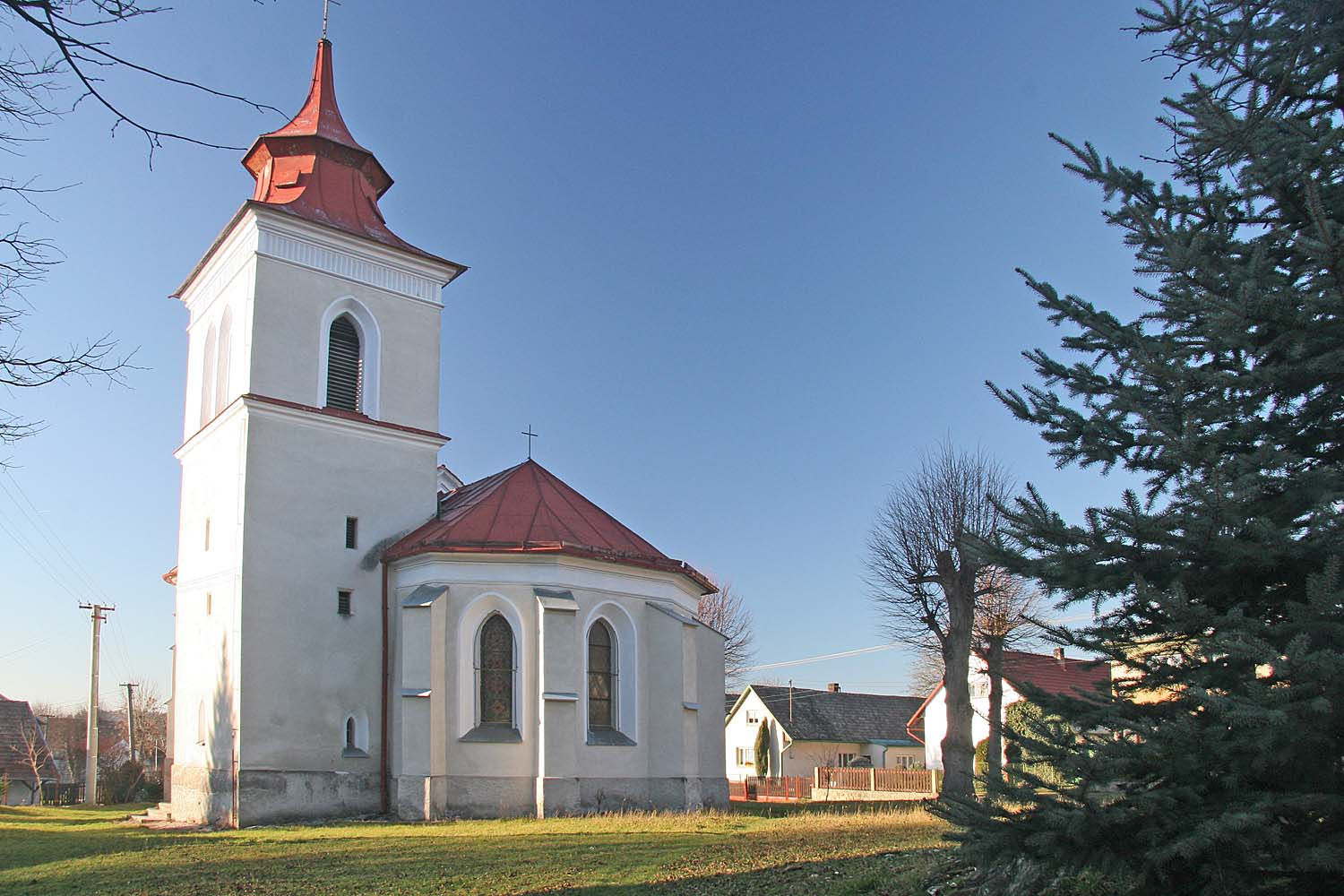
- Church of the Transfiguration

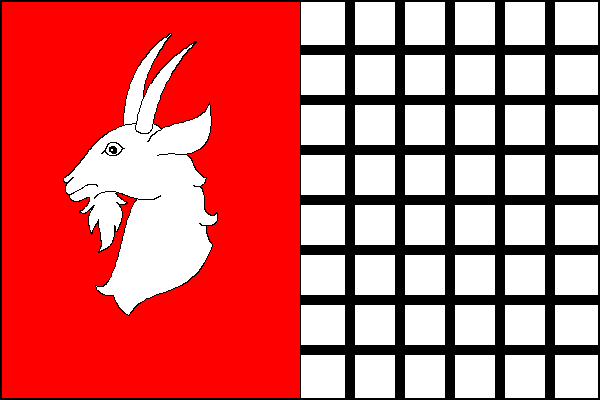
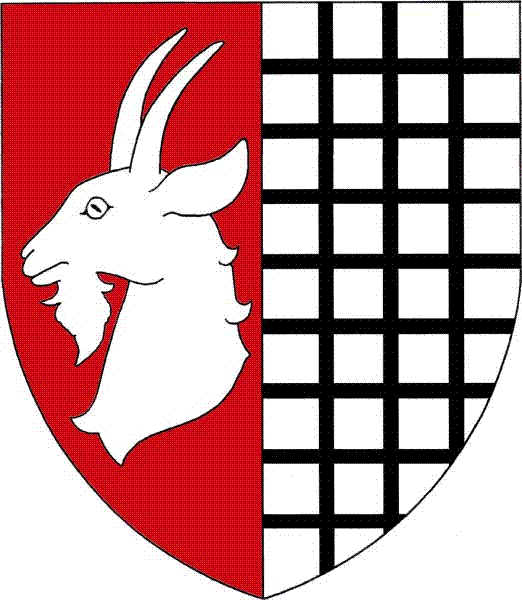
- Flag Coat of arms

- Location in the Czech Republic
- Coordinates: 49°40′13″N 15°15′12″E
- Country: Czech Republic
- Region: Vysočina
- District: Havlíčkův Brod
- First mentioned: 1352

Area
  - Total: 14.28 km^{2} (5.51 sq mi)
- Elevation: 446 m (1,463 ft)

Population (2026-01-01)
  - Total: 861
  - Density: 60.3/km^{2} (156/sq mi)
- Time zone: UTC+1 (CET)
  - Summer (DST): UTC+2 (CEST)
- Postal codes: 582 93, 584 01
- Website: www.kozli.cz

Kožlí is a municipality and village in Havlíčkův Brod District in the Vysočina Region of the Czech Republic. It has about 900 inhabitants.

Kožlí lies approximately 25 kilometres (16 mi) west of Havlíčkův Brod, 39 km (24 mi) north-west of Jihlava, and 76 km (47 mi) south-east of Prague.

== Administrative division ==
Kožlí consists of three municipal parts (in brackets population according to the 2021 census):

- Kožlí (578)
- Bohumilice (140)
- Sechov (82)

== Demographics ==
Historical population
Year	Pop.	±%
1869	939	—
1880	955	+1.7%
1890	975	+2.1%
1900	979	+0.4%
1910	1,015	+3.7%
1921	1,033	+1.8%
1930	1,009	−2.3%
1950	829	−17.8%
1961	859	+3.6%
1970	796	−7.3%
1980	787	−1.1%
1991	716	−9.0%
2001	748	+4.5%
2011	761	+1.7%
2021	800	+5.1%
Source: Censuses
