= Švihov Reservoir =

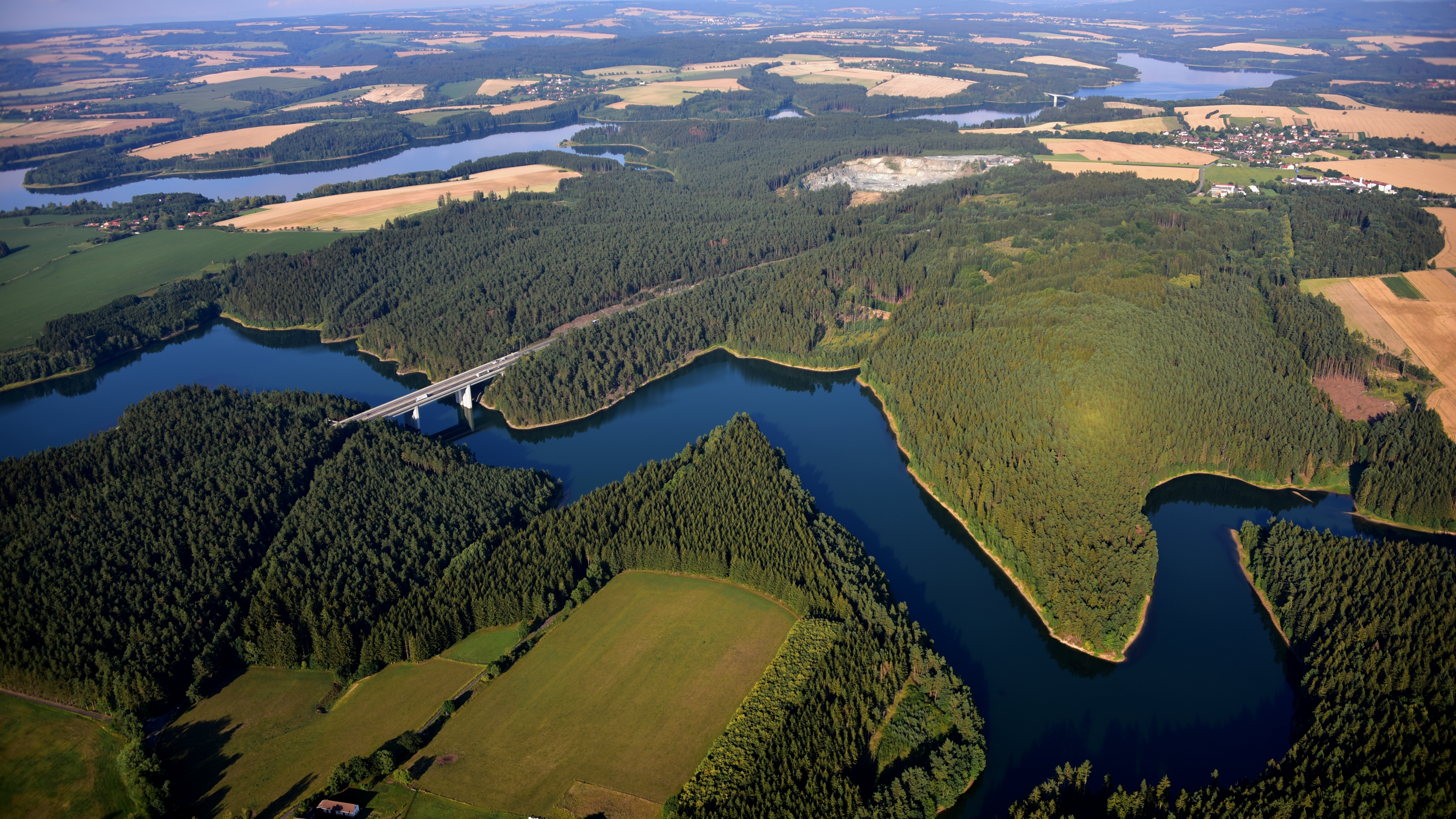
- Aerial view

- Location within Czech Republic
- Coordinates: 49°40′10″N 15°10′10″E
- Type: reservoir
- Primary inflows: Želivka
- Primary outflows: Želivka
- Basin countries: Czech Republic
- Surface area: 16.03 km^{2} (6.19 sq mi)
- Water volume: 309,000,000 m^{3} (251,000 acre⋅ft)
- Surface elevation: 376 m (1,234 ft)

Švihov Reservoir (Czech: vodní nádrž Švihov), also known as Želivka Reservoir, is a reservoir in the Vysočina and Central Bohemian regions of the Czech Republic. It is built on the Želivka River. With an area of 16.03 km^{2} (6.19 sq mi), it is the fourth largest reservoir in the country and the largest drinking water reservoir in Central Europe. It is the main source of drinking water for Prague.

== Location ==
Švihov is located in the Vysočina and Central Bohemian regions, predominantly in the Křemešník Highlands. It is located in a sparsely populated area; no city or town is located on its shore, only Zruč nad Sázavou is located near the northern end of the reservoir. The D1 motorway from Prague to Brno crosses the reservoir in two places.

== Characteristics ==
The reservoir is built on the Želivka river, four kilometres from its confluence with the Sázava. It has an area of the water surface of 16.03 km^{2} (6.19 sq mi) and total capacity of 309,000,000 m^{3} (251,000 acre⋅ft). The dam is 58 m (190 ft) high. The reservoir is managed by Povodí Vltavy, a state-owned enterprise.

The reservoir runs at a depth of 8 to 150 metres below the surrounding terrain. Due to the slight slope of most sections, the water flows through it by gravity.

== History ==
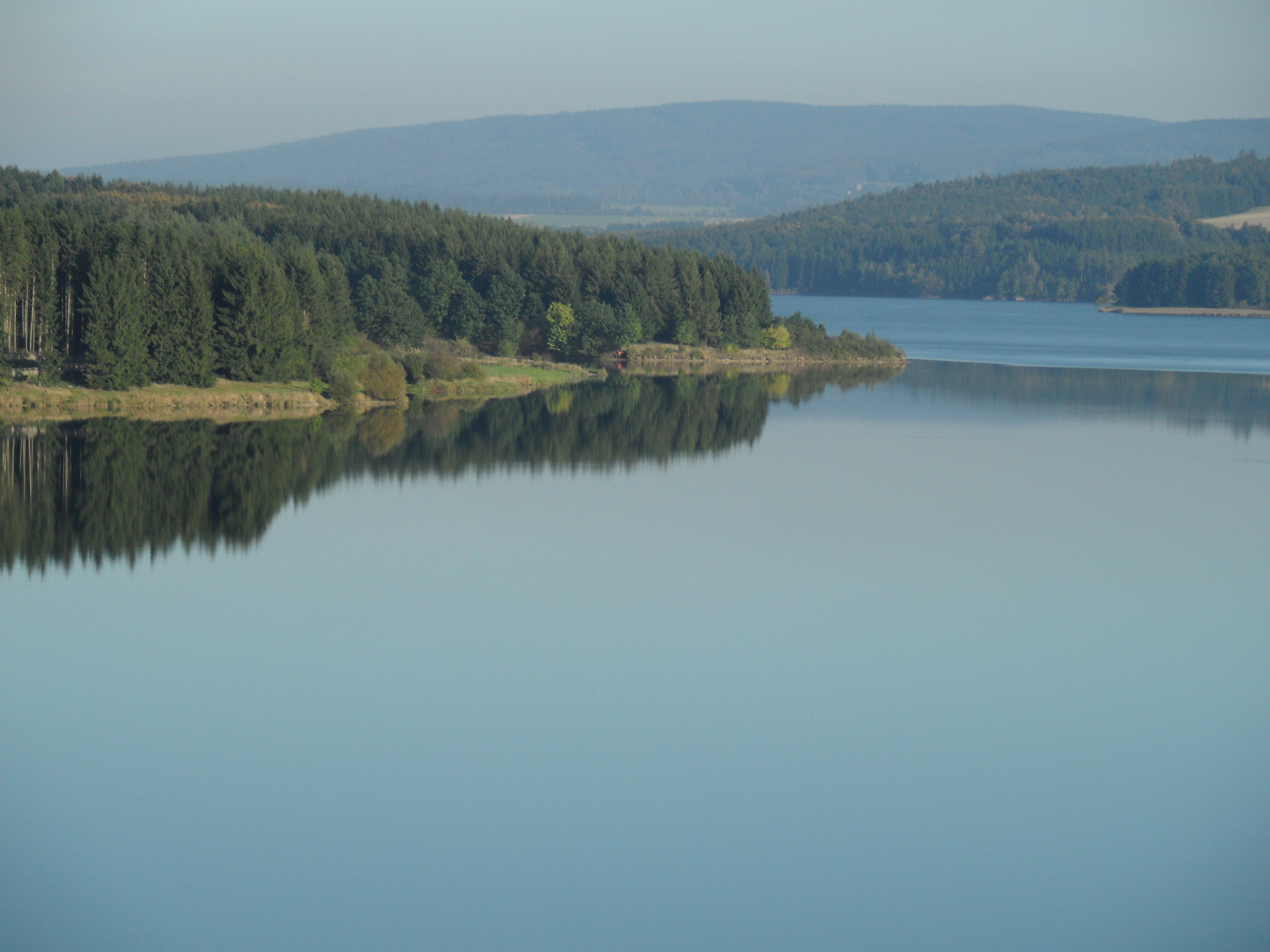
Švihov near Bernartice

Initially, several solutions were considered for the water management use of the Želivka River, e.g. creating a cascade of several smaller reservoirs. The concept of the reservoir was created in 1964. Construction began in 1965 and was completed in 1975. It was filled in 1972 and the first delivery of drinking water to Prague took place on 1 February 1973.

A system of smaller reservoirs (Trnávka, Němčice and Sedlice) was built on the Želivka (on the upper course) and on its tributaries, the purpose of which is to capture alluvium and sediments before they reach the reservoir. During construction, the small towns of Dolní Kralovice, Horní Kralovice and Zahrádka were flooded, just like several hamlets. Almost 900 building were demolished. The reservoir was named Švihov after one of the flooded villages.

== Purpose ==
The main purpose of the reservoir is to supply a large area of the country with drinking water, specifically most of the capital city of Prague and the Central Bohemian Region, and parts of the Vysočina Region. The Švihov Reservoir is the largest drinking water reservoir in Central Europe. Drinking water is brought to Prague by the Želivka Water Tunnel, which is the sixth longest water tunnel in the world.

== Tourism ==
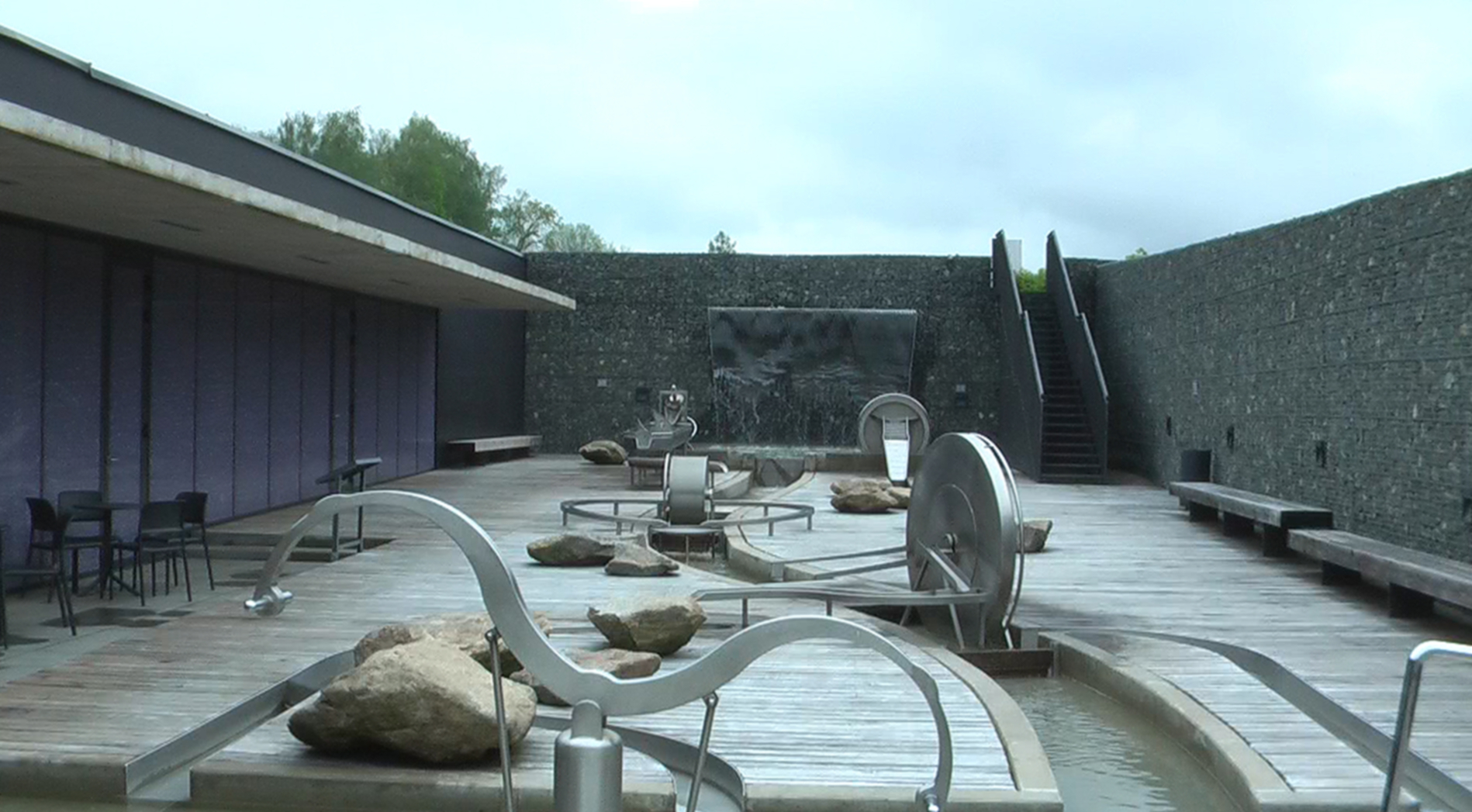
Vodní dům

Entry and exit are prohibited in the vicinity of the reservoir. Fishing and swimming are prohibited in the reservoir. In Hulice is the Vodní dům ("water house"), a visitor centre with an exposition on water treatment and with game elements for both children and adults. The visitor centre organizes guided tours of the dam of the Švihov Reservoir.
