= Hněvkovice =

- Municipality
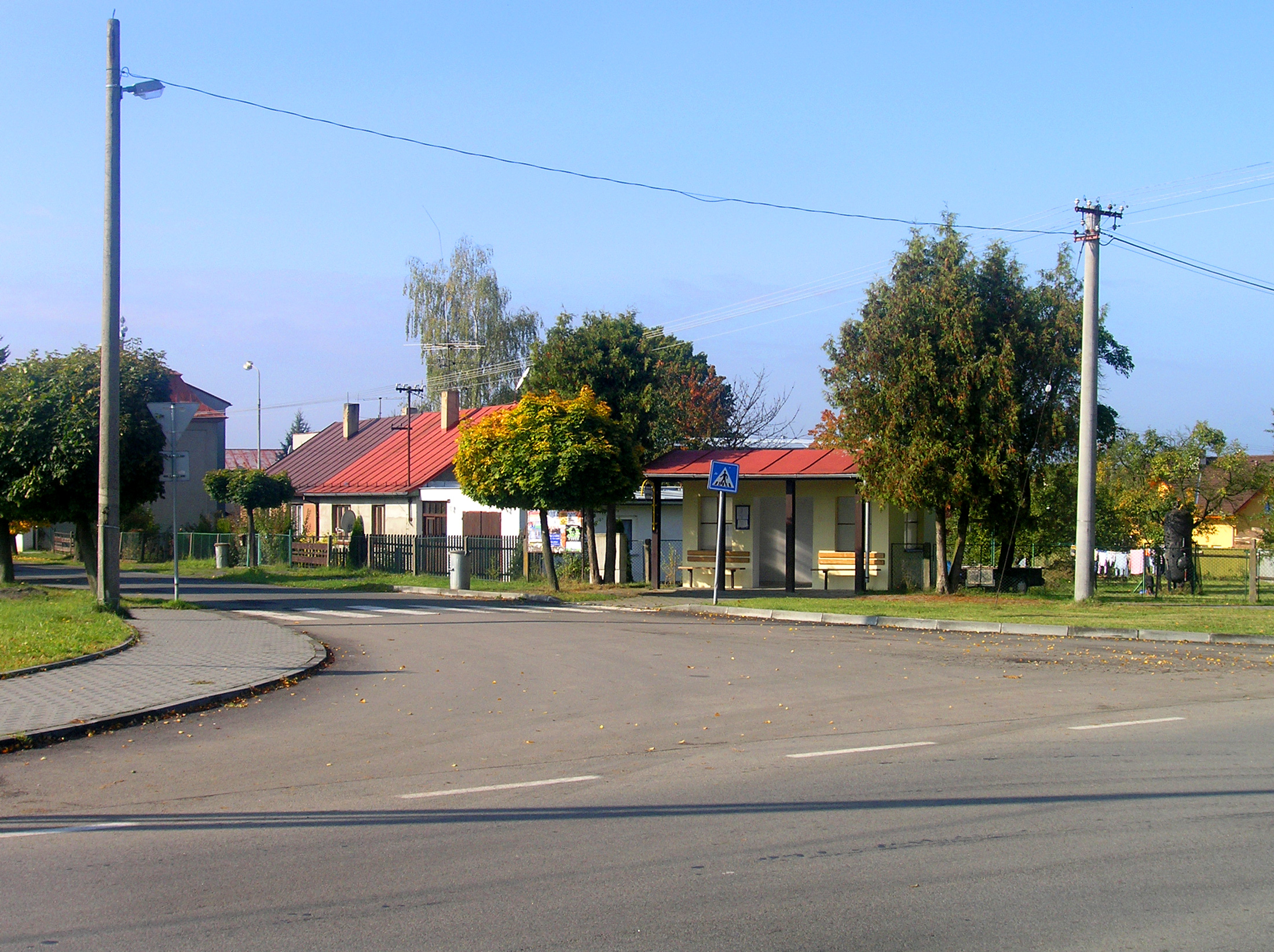
- Centre of Hněvkovice

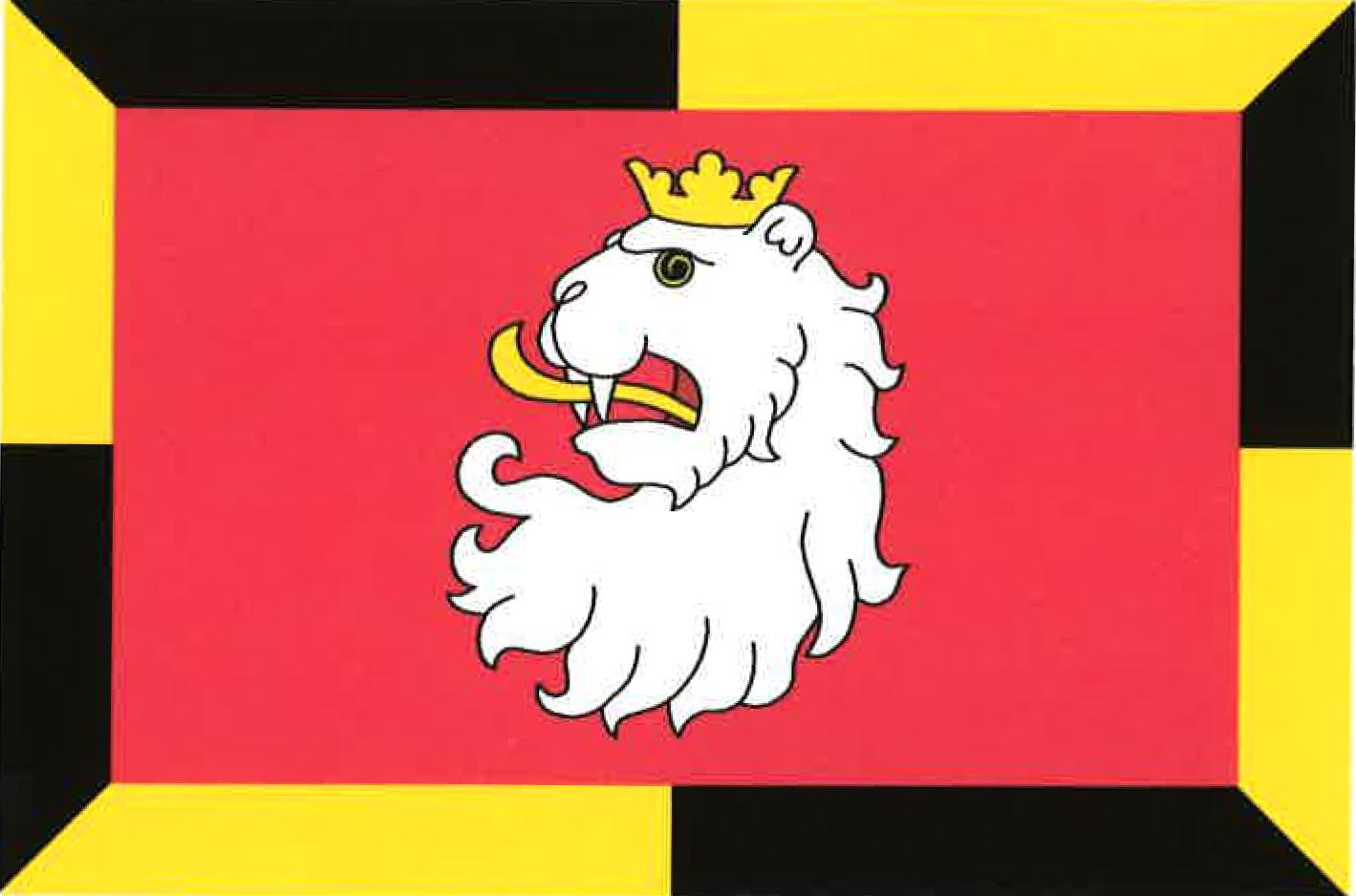
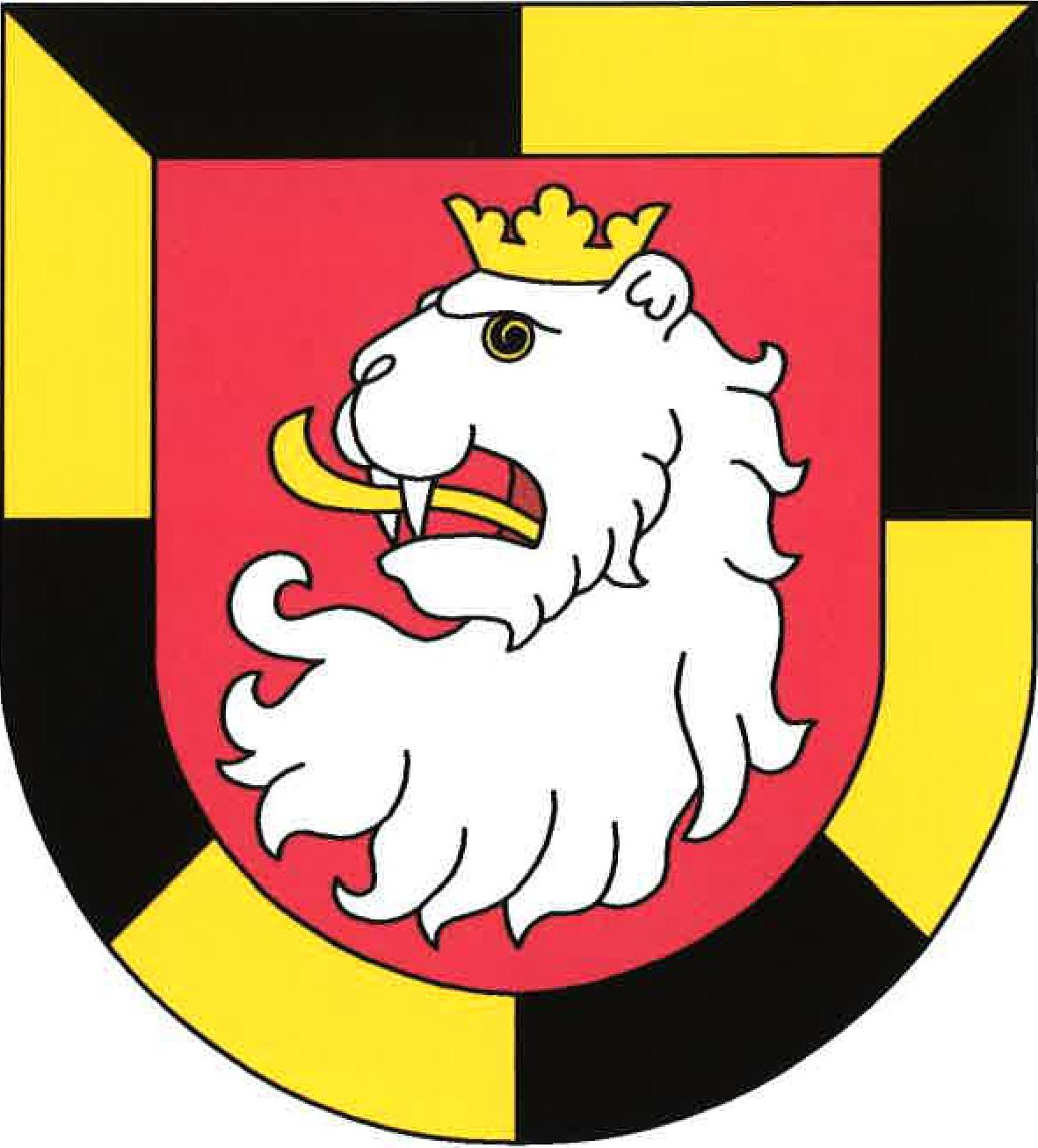
- Flag Coat of arms

- Location in the Czech Republic
- Coordinates: 49°41′0″N 15°11′59″E
- Country: Czech Republic
- Region: Vysočina
- District: Havlíčkův Brod
- First mentioned: 1262

Area
  - Total: 15.17 km^{2} (5.86 sq mi)
- Elevation: 447 m (1,467 ft)

Population (2026-01-01)
  - Total: 676
  - Density: 44.6/km^{2} (115/sq mi)
- Time zone: UTC+1 (CET)
  - Summer (DST): UTC+2 (CEST)
- Postal codes: 582 94, 584 01
- Website: www.hnevkovice.cz

Hněvkovice is a municipality and village in Havlíčkův Brod District in the Vysočina Region of the Czech Republic. It has about 700 inhabitants.

Hněvkovice lies approximately 29 kilometres (18 mi) west of Havlíčkův Brod, 43 km (27 mi) north-west of Jihlava, and 72 km (45 mi) south-east of Prague.

== Administrative division ==
Hněvkovice consists of eight municipal parts (in brackets population according to the 2021 census):

- Hněvkovice (380)
- Budeč (0)
- Chotěměřice (69)
- Habrovčice (24)
- Nová Ves u Dolních Kralovic (64)
- Štičí (13)
- Velká Paseka (7)
- Zahájí (57)

== Demographics ==
Historical population
| Year | Pop. | ±% |
|---|---|---|
| 1869 | 1,308 | — |
| 1880 | 1,355 | +3.6% |
| 1890 | 1,276 | −5.8% |
| 1900 | 1,260 | −1.3% |
| 1910 | 1,172 | −7.0% |
| 1921 | 1,144 | −2.4% |
| 1930 | 1,070 | −6.5% |
| 1950 | 829 | −22.5% |
| 1961 | 819 | −1.2% |
| 1970 | 722 | −11.8% |
| 1980 | 639 | −11.5% |
| 1991 | 588 | −8.0% |
| 2001 | 571 | −2.9% |
| 2011 | 598 | +4.7% |
| 2021 | 614 | +2.7% |
Source: Censuses
