= Krasíkovice =

- Municipality
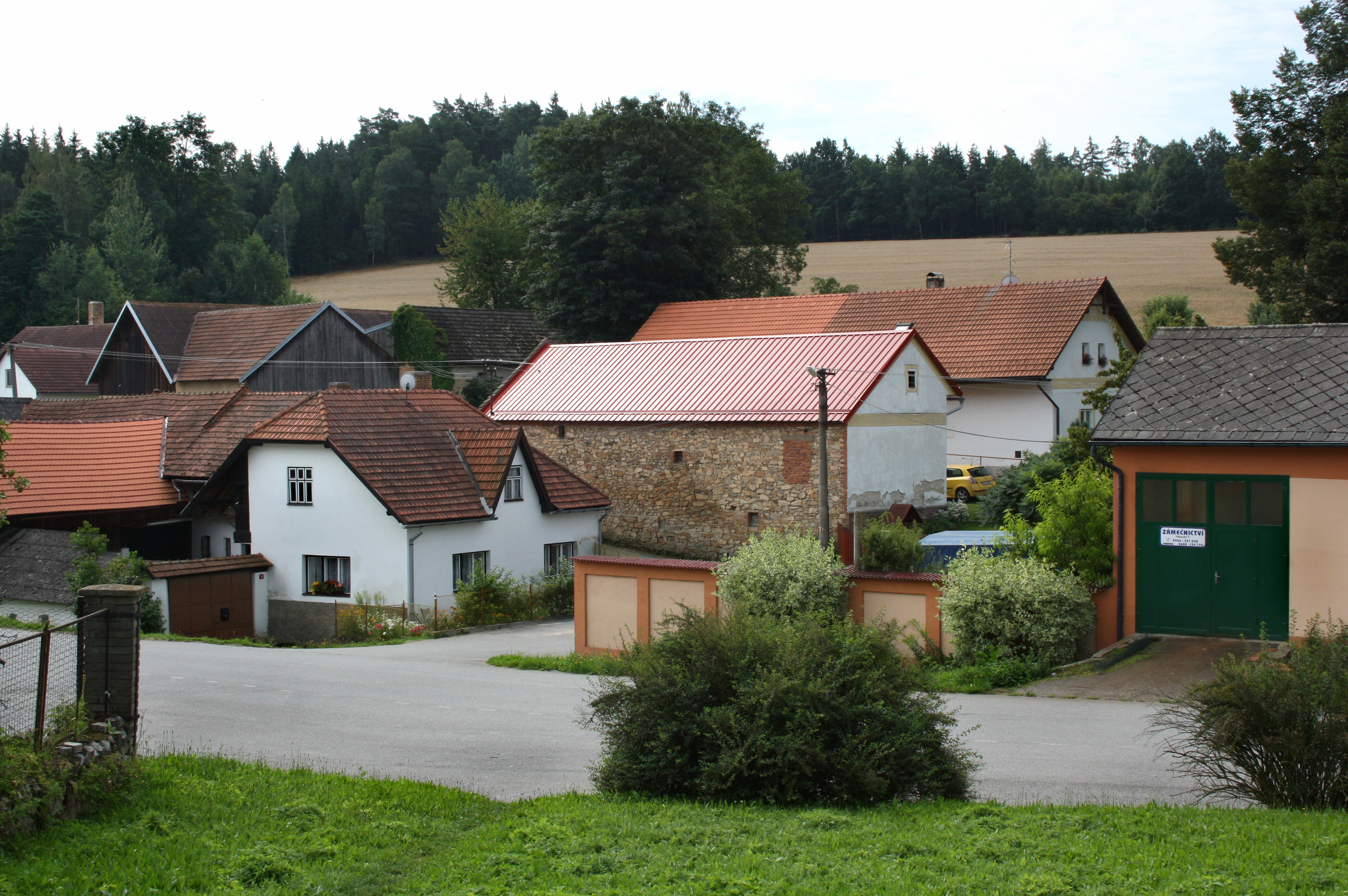
- Southern part of Krasíkovice

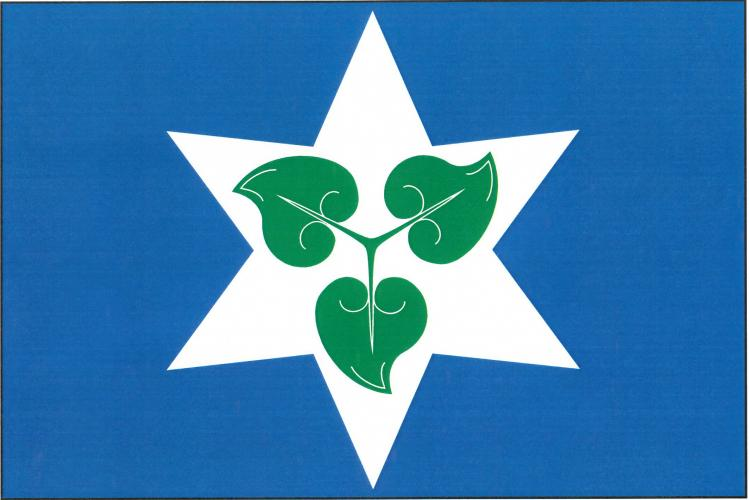
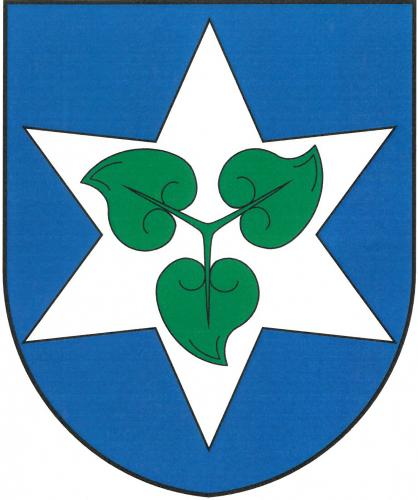
- Flag Coat of arms

- Location in the Czech Republic
- Coordinates: 49°27′42″N 15°13′43″E
- Country: Czech Republic
- Region: Vysočina
- District: Pelhřimov
- First mentioned: 1379

Area
  - Total: 2.22 km^{2} (0.86 sq mi)
- Elevation: 495 m (1,624 ft)

Population (2026-01-01)
  - Total: 134
  - Density: 60.4/km^{2} (156/sq mi)
- Time zone: UTC+1 (CET)
  - Summer (DST): UTC+2 (CEST)
- Postal code: 393 01
- Website: www.krasikovice.cz

Krasíkovice is a municipality and village in Pelhřimov District in the Vysočina Region of the Czech Republic. It has about 100 inhabitants. The municipality forms an enclave in the territory of Pelhřimov.

Krasíkovice lies approximately 5 kilometres (3 mi) north of Pelhřimov, 28 km (17 mi) west of Jihlava, and 90 km (56 mi) south-east of Prague.

== Demographics ==
Historical population
Year	Pop.	±%
1869	106	—
1880	94	−11.3%
1890	114	+21.3%
1900	110	−3.5%
1910	106	−3.6%
1921	120	+13.2%
1930	103	−14.2%
1950	79	−23.3%
1961	78	−1.3%
1970	70	−10.3%
1980	78	+11.4%
1991	88	+12.8%
2001	112	+27.3%
2011	119	+6.2%
2021	131	+10.1%
Source: Censuses
