= Svépravice =

- Municipality
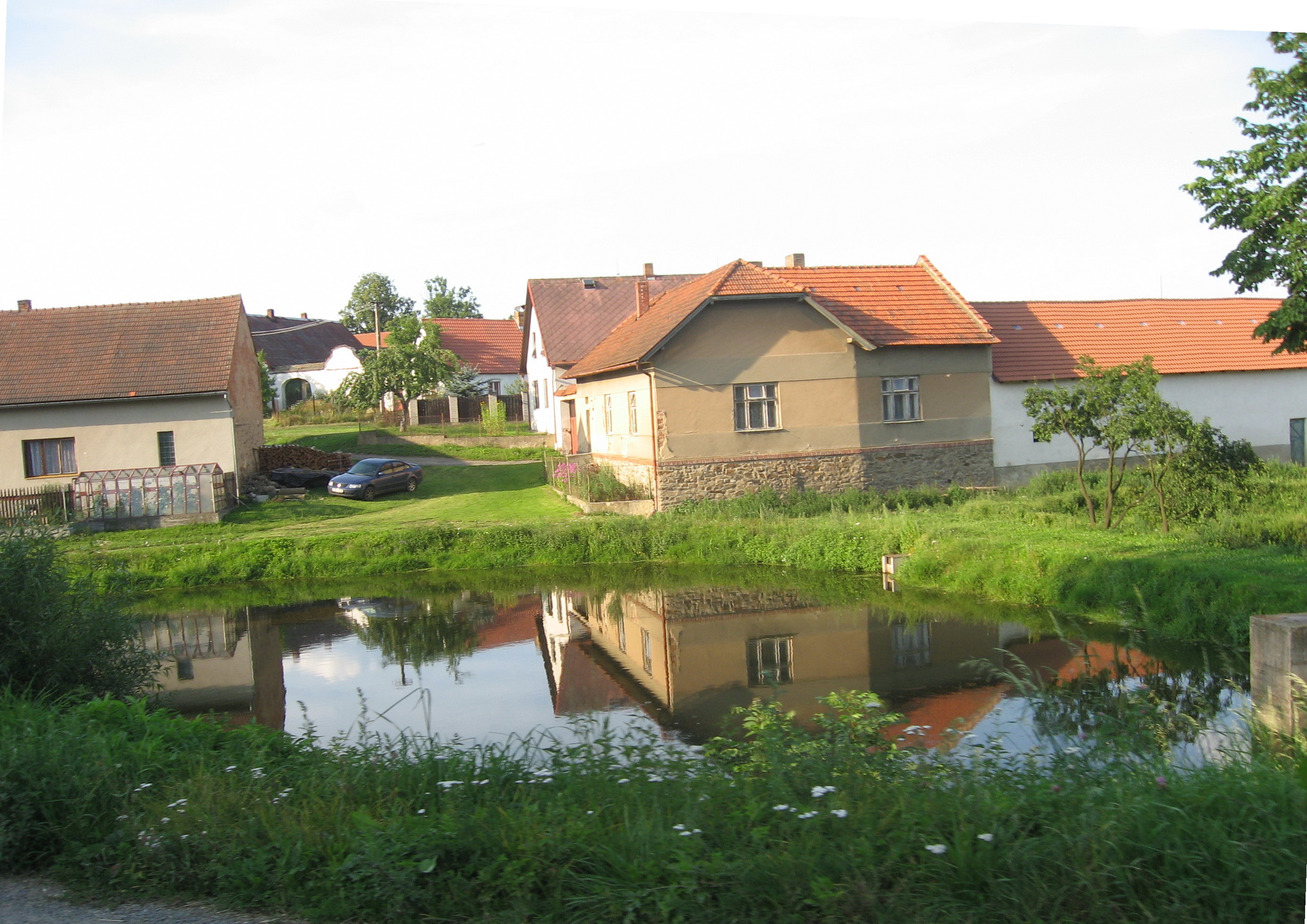
- Pond in Svépravice

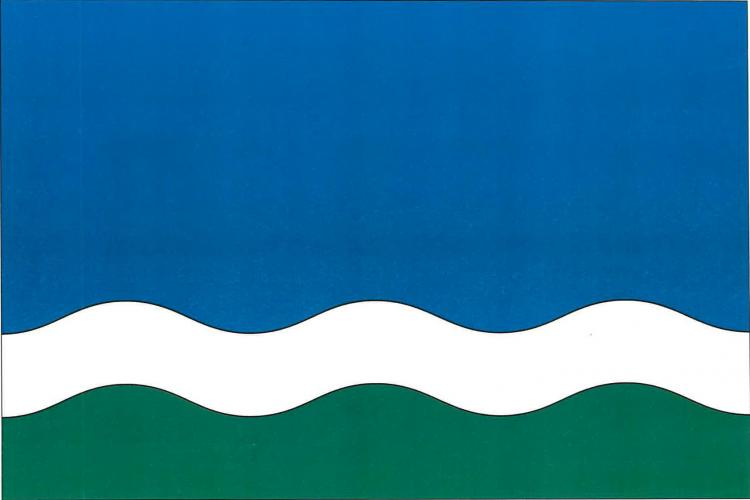
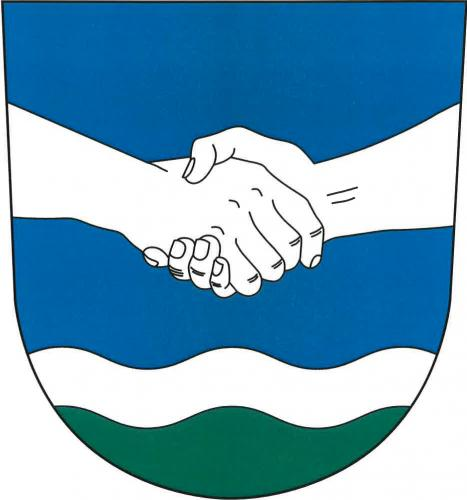
- Flag Coat of arms

- Location in the Czech Republic
- Coordinates: 49°29′44″N 15°13′58″E
- Country: Czech Republic
- Region: Vysočina
- District: Pelhřimov
- First mentioned: 1360

Area
  - Total: 5.16 km^{2} (1.99 sq mi)
- Elevation: 512 m (1,680 ft)

Population (2026-01-01)
  - Total: 113
  - Density: 21.9/km^{2} (56.7/sq mi)
- Time zone: UTC+1 (CET)
  - Summer (DST): UTC+2 (CEST)
- Postal code: 393 01
- Website: www.svepravice.cz

Svépravice is a municipality and village in Pelhřimov District in the Vysočina Region of the Czech Republic. It has about 100 inhabitants.

Svépravice lies approximately 8 kilometres (5 mi) north of Pelhřimov, 28 km (17 mi) north-west of Jihlava, and 89 km (55 mi) south-east of Prague.

== Demographics ==
Historical population
Year	Pop.	±%
1869	358	—
1880	336	−6.1%
1890	323	−3.9%
1900	332	+2.8%
1910	306	−7.8%
1921	332	+8.5%
1930	285	−14.2%
1950	190	−33.3%
1961	201	+5.8%
1970	175	−12.9%
1980	138	−21.1%
1991	123	−10.9%
2001	124	+0.8%
2011	119	−4.0%
2021	123	+3.4%
Source: Censuses
