= Bernartice (Benešov District) =

- Municipality
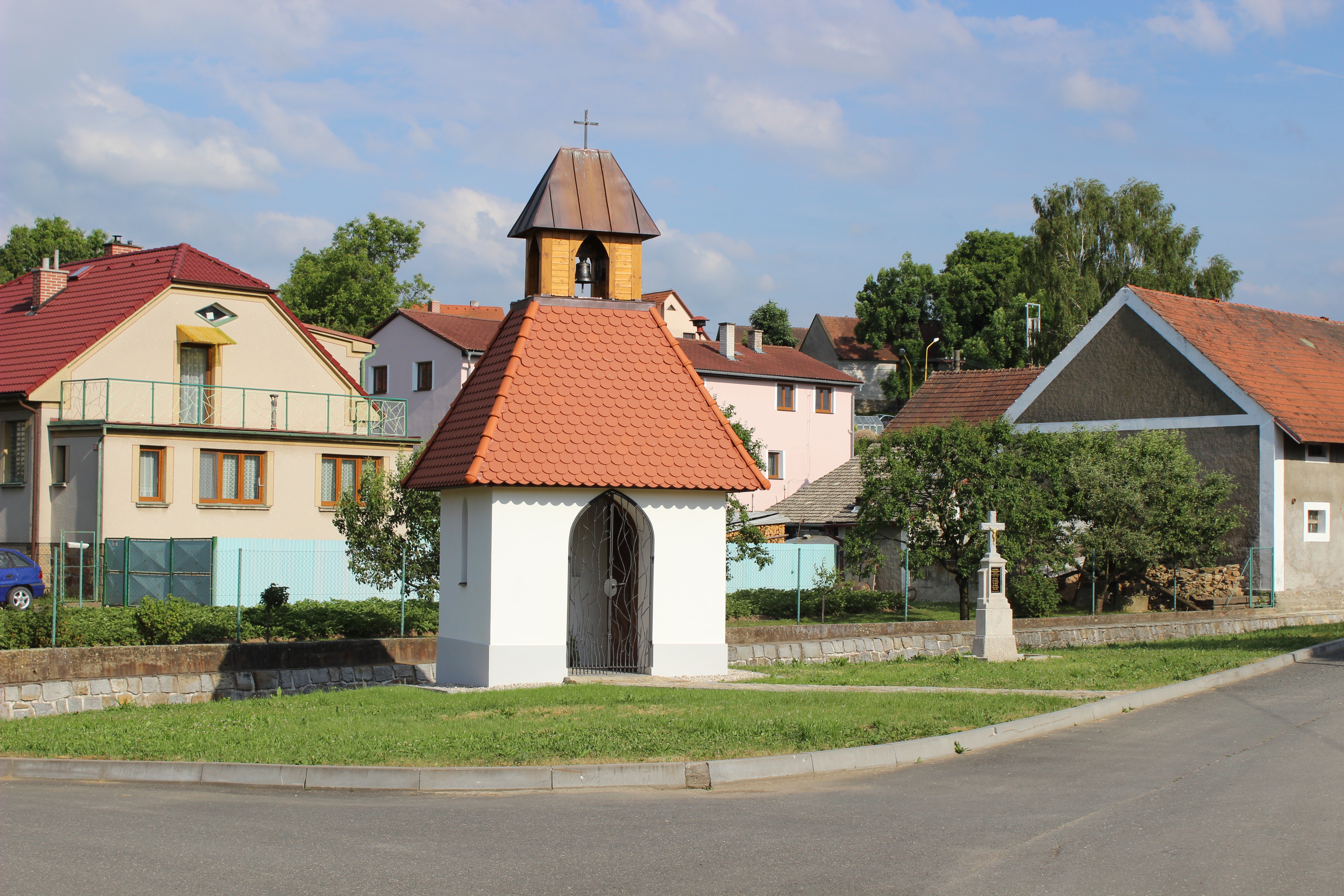
- Chapel in the centre of Bernartice

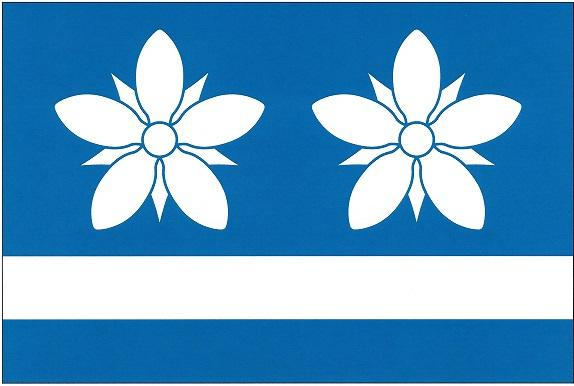
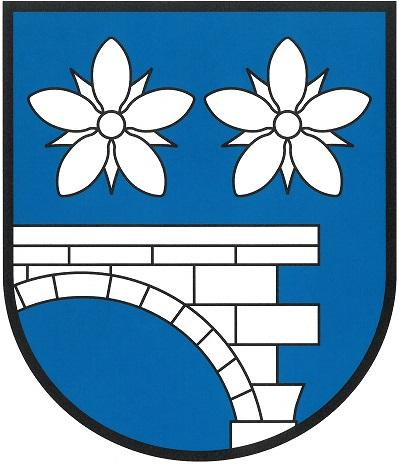
- Flag Coat of arms

- Location in the Czech Republic
- Coordinates: 49°40′32″N 15°7′45″E
- Country: Czech Republic
- Region: Central Bohemian
- District: Benešov
- First mentioned: 1375

Area
  - Total: 10.11 km^{2} (3.90 sq mi)
- Elevation: 403 m (1,322 ft)

Population (2026-01-01)
  - Total: 222
  - Density: 22.0/km^{2} (56.9/sq mi)
- Time zone: UTC+1 (CET)
  - Summer (DST): UTC+2 (CEST)
- Postal code: 257 65
- Website: www.bernartice-borovsko.cz

Bernartice is a municipality and village in Benešov District in the Central Bohemian Region of the Czech Republic. It has about 200 inhabitants.

== Administrative division ==
Bernartice consists of two municipal parts (in brackets population according to the 2021 census):

- Bernartice (209)
- Borovsko (16)

== Etymology ==
The name Bernartice is derived from the personal name Bernart (a variant of Bernard), meaning "the village of Bernart's people".

== Geography ==
Bernartice is located about 33 kilometres (21 mi) southeast of Benešov and 60 km (37 mi) southeast of Prague. It lies in the Křemešník Highlands. The highest point is at 450 m (1,480 ft) above sea level. The municipality is situated on a peninsula created by the Švihov and Němčice reservoirs. The village of Borovsko is located in its tip.

== History ==
The first written mention of Bernartice is from 1375.

Borovsko was first mentioned in 1289. It was originally a market town with a castle. The castle was destroyed before 1559 and replaced by a fortress in 1600. During the Thirty Years' War, the fortress was destroyed, Borovsko was badly damaged, and its market town status was lost. During the construction of Švihov Reservoir between 1965 and 1975, most of the village was flooded.

== Demographics ==
Historical population

| Year | Pop. | ±% |
|---|---|---|
| 1869 | 634 | — |
| 1880 | 671 | +5.8% |
| 1890 | 693 | +3.3% |
| 1900 | 630 | −9.1% |
| 1910 | 624 | −1.0% |

| Year | Pop. | ±% |
|---|---|---|
| 1921 | 604 | −3.2% |
| 1930 | 573 | −5.1% |
| 1950 | 450 | −21.5% |
| 1961 | 416 | −7.6% |
| 1970 | 326 | −21.6% |

| Year | Pop. | ±% |
|---|---|---|
| 1980 | 271 | −16.9% |
| 1991 | 246 | −9.2% |
| 2001 | 228 | −7.3% |
| 2011 | 212 | −7.0% |
| 2021 | 225 | +6.1% |

Source: Censuses

== Transport ==
The D1 motorway from Prague to Brno runs through the eastern part of the municipality.

== Sights ==
The Church of Saints Peter and Paul in Borovsko was consecrated in 1350. After it was destroyed during the Thirty Years' War, it was rebuilt in the early Baroque style after 1700. The free-standing bell tower dates from 1483.
