= Ježov (Pelhřimov District) =

- Municipality
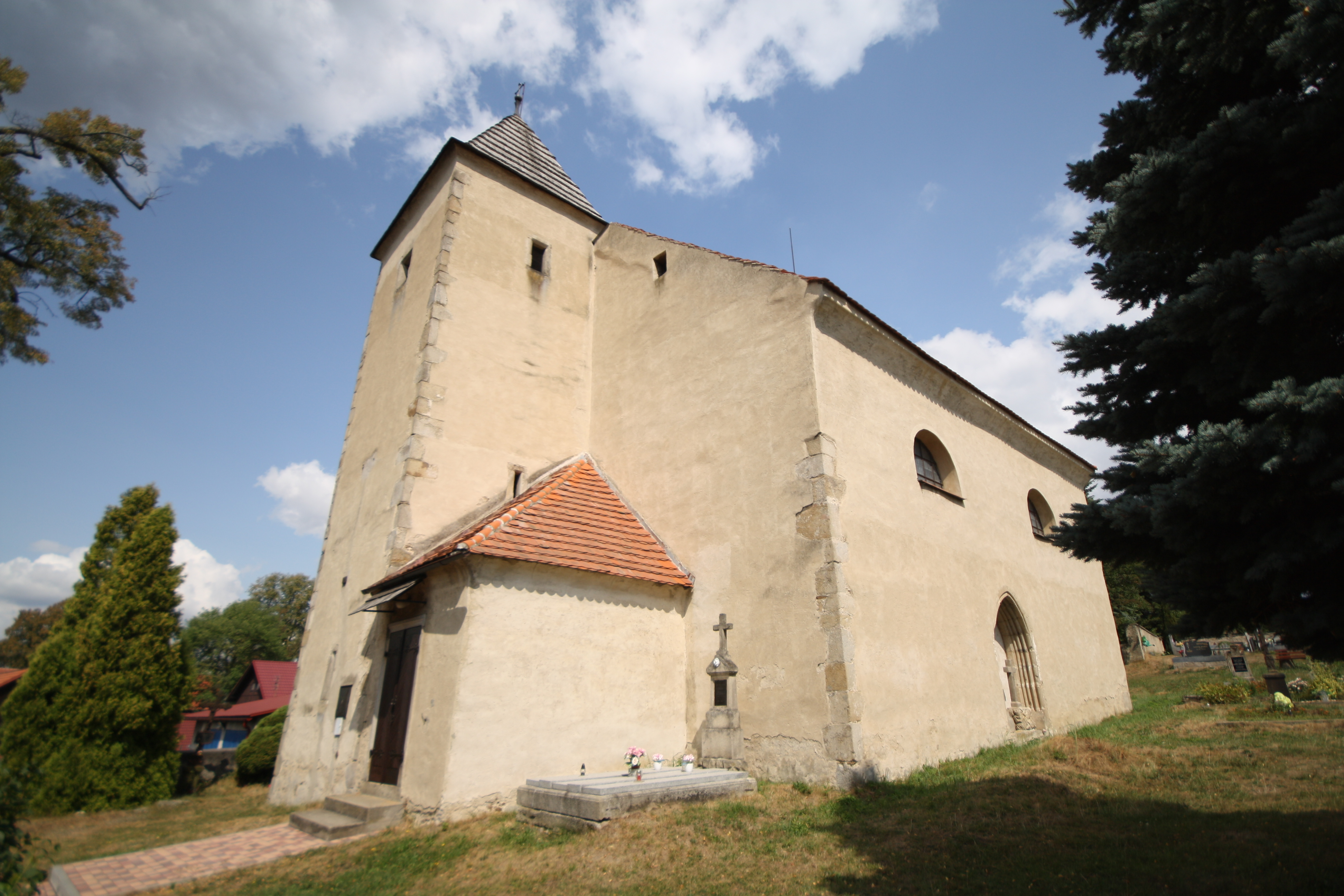
- Church of Saint Lucy

- Location in the Czech Republic
- Coordinates: 49°36′47″N 15°14′2″E
- Country: Czech Republic
- Region: Vysočina
- District: Pelhřimov
- First mentioned: 1352

Area
  - Total: 3.03 km^{2} (1.17 sq mi)
- Elevation: 441 m (1,447 ft)

Population (2026-01-01)
  - Total: 69
  - Density: 23/km^{2} (59/sq mi)
- Time zone: UTC+1 (CET)
  - Summer (DST): UTC+2 (CEST)
- Postal code: 396 01
- Website: www.obecjezov.cz

Ježov is a municipality and village in Pelhřimov District in the Vysočina Region of the Czech Republic. It has about 70 inhabitants.

Ježov lies approximately 21 kilometres (13 mi) north of Pelhřimov, 36 km (22 mi) north-west of Jihlava, and 79 km (49 mi) south-east of Prague.

== Demographics ==
Historical population
Year	Pop.	±%
1869	180	—
1880	200	+11.1%
1890	216	+8.0%
1900	226	+4.6%
1910	210	−7.1%
1921	239	+13.8%
1930	211	−11.7%
1950	168	−20.4%
1961	159	−5.4%
1970	128	−19.5%
1980	107	−16.4%
1991	80	−25.2%
2001	65	−18.8%
2011	60	−7.7%
2021	74	+23.3%
Source: Censuses
