= Ondřejov (Pelhřimov District) =

- Municipality
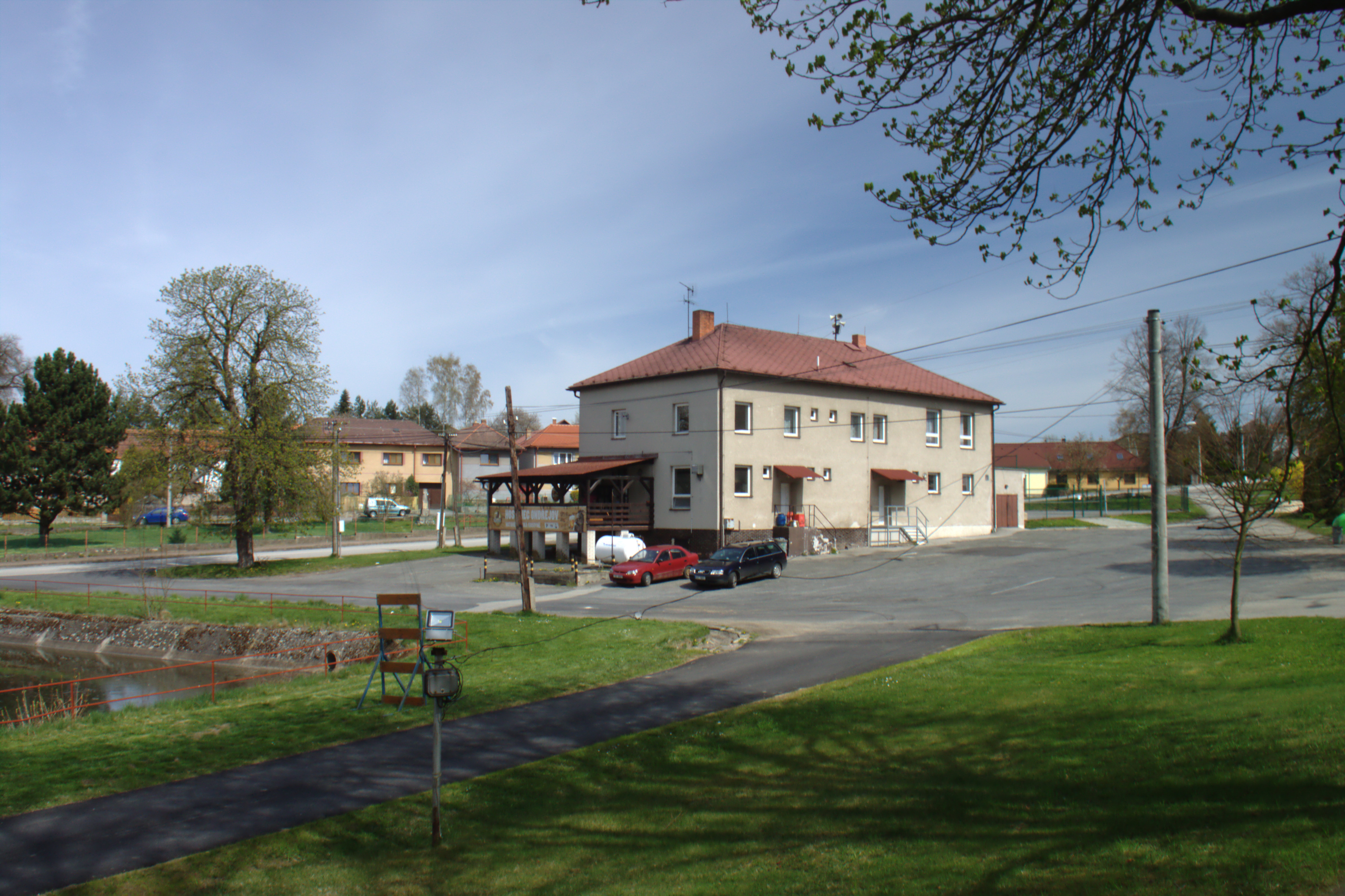
- Centre of Ondřejov

- Location in the Czech Republic
- Coordinates: 49°23′35″N 15°10′41″E
- Country: Czech Republic
- Region: Vysočina
- District: Pelhřimov
- First mentioned: 1406

Area
  - Total: 4.53 km^{2} (1.75 sq mi)
- Elevation: 563 m (1,847 ft)

Population (2026-01-01)
  - Total: 168
  - Density: 37.1/km^{2} (96.1/sq mi)
- Time zone: UTC+1 (CET)
  - Summer (DST): UTC+2 (CEST)
- Postal code: 393 01
- Website: www.obec-ondrejov.cz

Ondřejov is a municipality and village in Pelhřimov District in the Vysočina Region of the Czech Republic. It has about 200 inhabitants.

Ondřejov lies approximately 5 kilometres (3 mi) south-west of Pelhřimov, 30 km (19 mi) west of Jihlava, and 94 km (58 mi) south-east of Prague.

== Demographics ==
Historical population
Year	Pop.	±%
1869	211	—
1880	225	+6.6%
1890	198	−12.0%
1900	204	+3.0%
1910	219	+7.4%
1921	220	+0.5%
1930	217	−1.4%
1950	175	−19.4%
1961	175	+0.0%
1970	173	−1.1%
1980	157	−9.2%
1991	133	−15.3%
2001	125	−6.0%
2011	142	+13.6%
2021	160	+12.7%
Source: Censuses
