= Odlezly Lake =

Lake in the Czech Republic

- Odlezelské jezero (Czech)
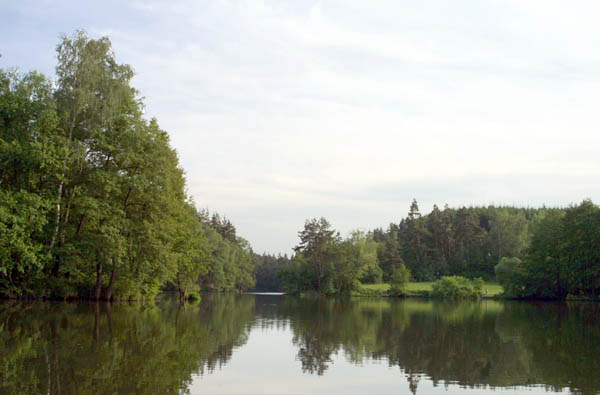
- Northern end of lake

- Location within Czech Republic
- Location: Žihle, Czech Republic
- Coordinates: 50°0′58″N 13°22′23″E
- Primary inflows: Mladotický potok, Odlezelský potok
- Basin countries: Czech Republic
- Max. length: 500 m (1,600 ft)
- Max. width: 100 m (330 ft)
- Surface area: 4.5 ha (11 acres)
- Surface elevation: 413 m (1,355 ft)

Odlezly Lake (Czech: Odlezelské jezero, sometimes Mladotické- or Potvorovské-) is the youngest lake in the Czech Republic. The lake and its surroundings is protected as a national nature monument.

The lake is located near the village of Odlezly within the municipality of Žihle, under the hill Potvorovský (546 m). Two creeks discharge here: Mladotický and Odlezelský.

During 25–26 May 1872, heavy rain flooded the Mladotický creek. During night of 27/28 May, the Permo-Carboniferous layers on west slope of the hill slipped and blocked the stream. The flooding was not the only reason of the landslide - structure of the hillside resulted in constant slow shift down, sandstone quarries used for centuries had lowered stability of the slope and the recently built railway Plzeň–Žatec cut yet another dent to the hill.

The landslide destroyed the railroad which got later rebuilt on the opposite side of the valley. Levee of large Mladotický pond (Mladotický rybník, few kilometers downstream, 90 hectares) was broken by the flooded stream; the pond was never rebuilt.

The lake has area of 4.5 hectares, length around 500 m and its width varies between 70 and 100 m. Its surface is 413 m above sea level. Depth was 7.7 m in 1972 and only 6.7 m in 1999 – the lake is slowly clogging up and without human intervention it would disappear within decades.

On 7 March 1975, the lake and its surroundings were declared a national nature monument with an area of 70.7 ha (175 acres). The zone around it 37.7 ha (93 acres) is subject of restrictions.

There were recorded 16 species of freshwater molluscs in the Odlezelské jezero National Nature Monument in 2013–2023. That includes 8 species of freshwater gastropods and 8 species of bivalves. 13 species of freshwater molluscs were found in the Odlezly Lake.
