= Koberovice =

- Municipality
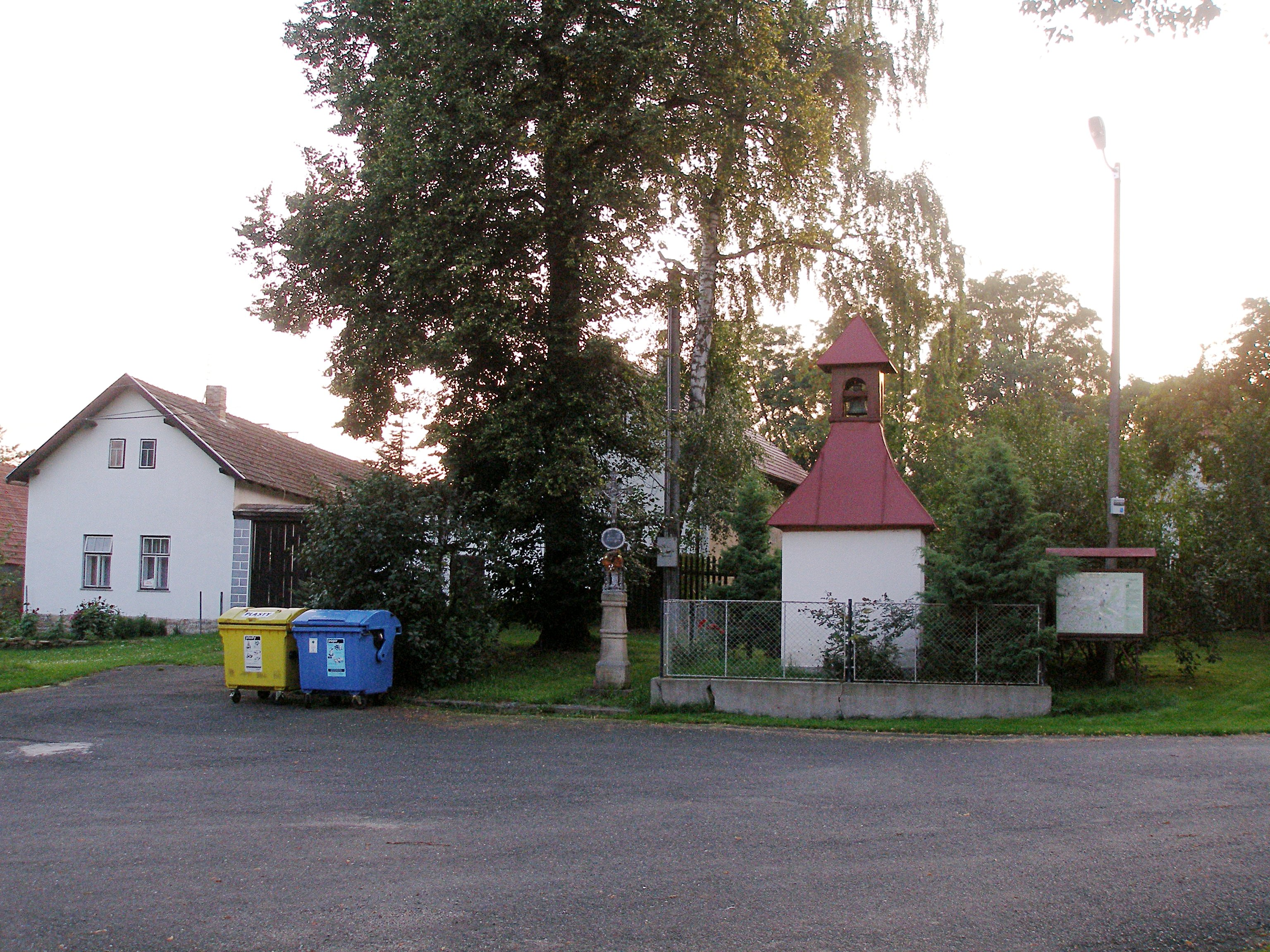
- Chapel in Koberovice

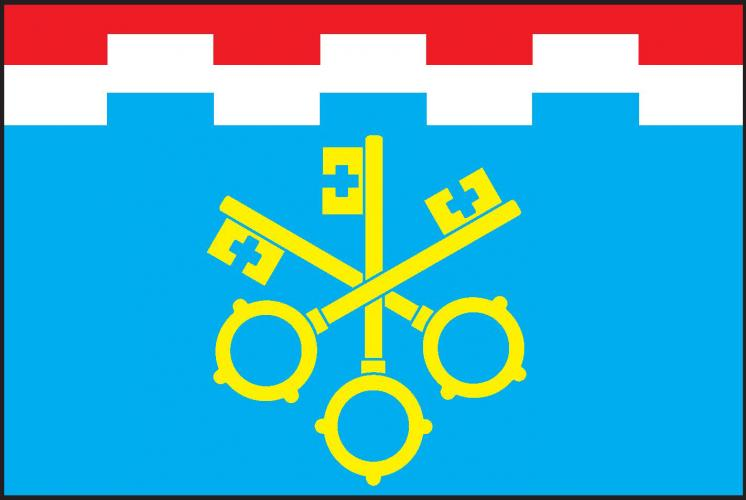
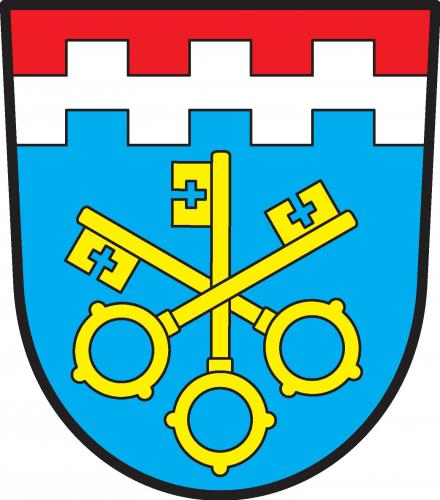
- Flag Coat of arms

- Location in the Czech Republic
- Coordinates: 49°35′15″N 15°15′46″E
- Country: Czech Republic
- Region: Vysočina
- District: Pelhřimov
- First mentioned: 1341

Area
  - Total: 7.28 km^{2} (2.81 sq mi)
- Elevation: 470 m (1,540 ft)

Population (2026-01-01)
  - Total: 181
  - Density: 24.9/km^{2} (64.4/sq mi)
- Time zone: UTC+1 (CET)
  - Summer (DST): UTC+2 (CEST)
- Postal code: 396 01
- Website: www.koberovice.cz

Koberovice is a municipality and village in Pelhřimov District in the Vysočina Region of the Czech Republic. It has about 200 inhabitants.

Koberovice lies approximately 18 kilometres (11 mi) north of Pelhřimov, 33 km (21 mi) north-west of Jihlava, and 82 km (51 mi) south-east of Prague.

== Administrative division ==
Koberovice consists of three municipal parts (in brackets population according to the 2021 census):

- Koberovice (131)
- Lísky (26)
- Lohenice (16)

== Demographics ==
Historical population
Year	Pop.	±%
1869	513	—
1880	527	+2.7%
1890	546	+3.6%
1900	537	−1.6%
1910	459	−14.5%
1921	461	+0.4%
1930	414	−10.2%
1950	308	−25.6%
1961	278	−9.7%
1970	243	−12.6%
1980	205	−15.6%
1991	180	−12.2%
2001	151	−16.1%
2011	147	−2.6%
2021	173	+17.7%
Source: Censuses
