= Ústrašín =

- Municipality
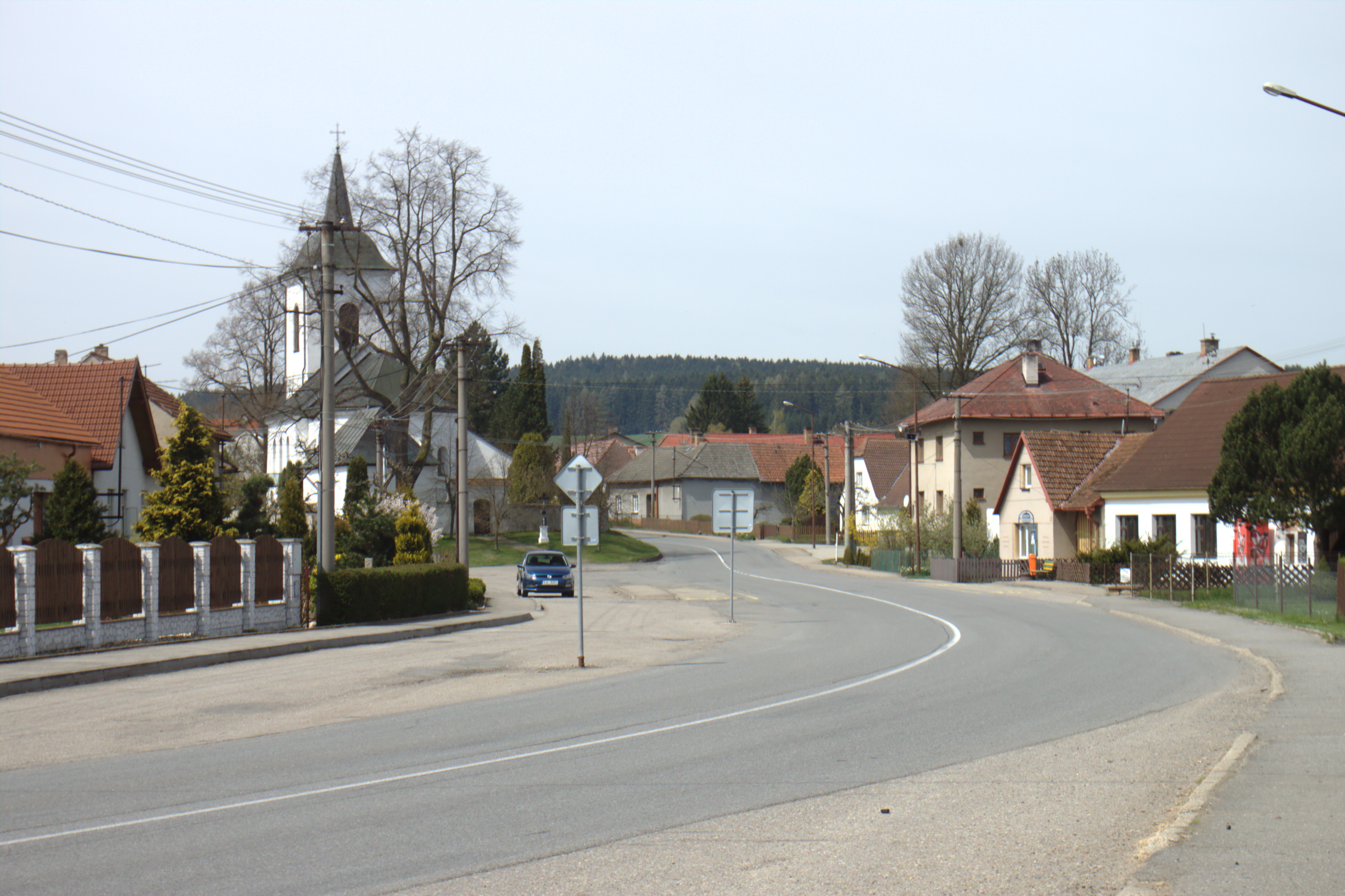
- Centre of Ústrašín

- Location in the Czech Republic
- Coordinates: 49°22′57″N 15°10′7″E
- Country: Czech Republic
- Region: Vysočina
- District: Pelhřimov
- First mentioned: 1352

Area
  - Total: 7.02 km^{2} (2.71 sq mi)
- Elevation: 558 m (1,831 ft)

Population (2026-01-01)
  - Total: 260
  - Density: 37/km^{2} (96/sq mi)
- Time zone: UTC+1 (CET)
  - Summer (DST): UTC+2 (CEST)
- Postal code: 393 01
- Website: www.ustrasin.cz

Ústrašín is a municipality and village in Pelhřimov District in the Vysočina Region of the Czech Republic. It has about 300 inhabitants.

Ústrašín lies approximately 7 kilometres (4 mi) south-west of Pelhřimov, 32 km (20 mi) west of Jihlava, and 95 km (59 mi) south-east of Prague.

== Demographics ==
Historical population
| Year | Pop. | ±% |
|---|---|---|
| 1869 | 374 | — |
| 1880 | 357 | −4.5% |
| 1890 | 336 | −5.9% |
| 1900 | 353 | +5.1% |
| 1910 | 359 | +1.7% |
| 1921 | 338 | −5.8% |
| 1930 | 319 | −5.6% |
| 1950 | 261 | −18.2% |
| 1961 | 267 | +2.3% |
| 1970 | 230 | −13.9% |
| 1980 | 208 | −9.6% |
| 1991 | 192 | −7.7% |
| 2001 | 180 | −6.2% |
| 2011 | 219 | +21.7% |
| 2021 | 252 | +15.1% |
Source: Censuses
