= Sedlice (Pelhřimov District) =

- Municipality
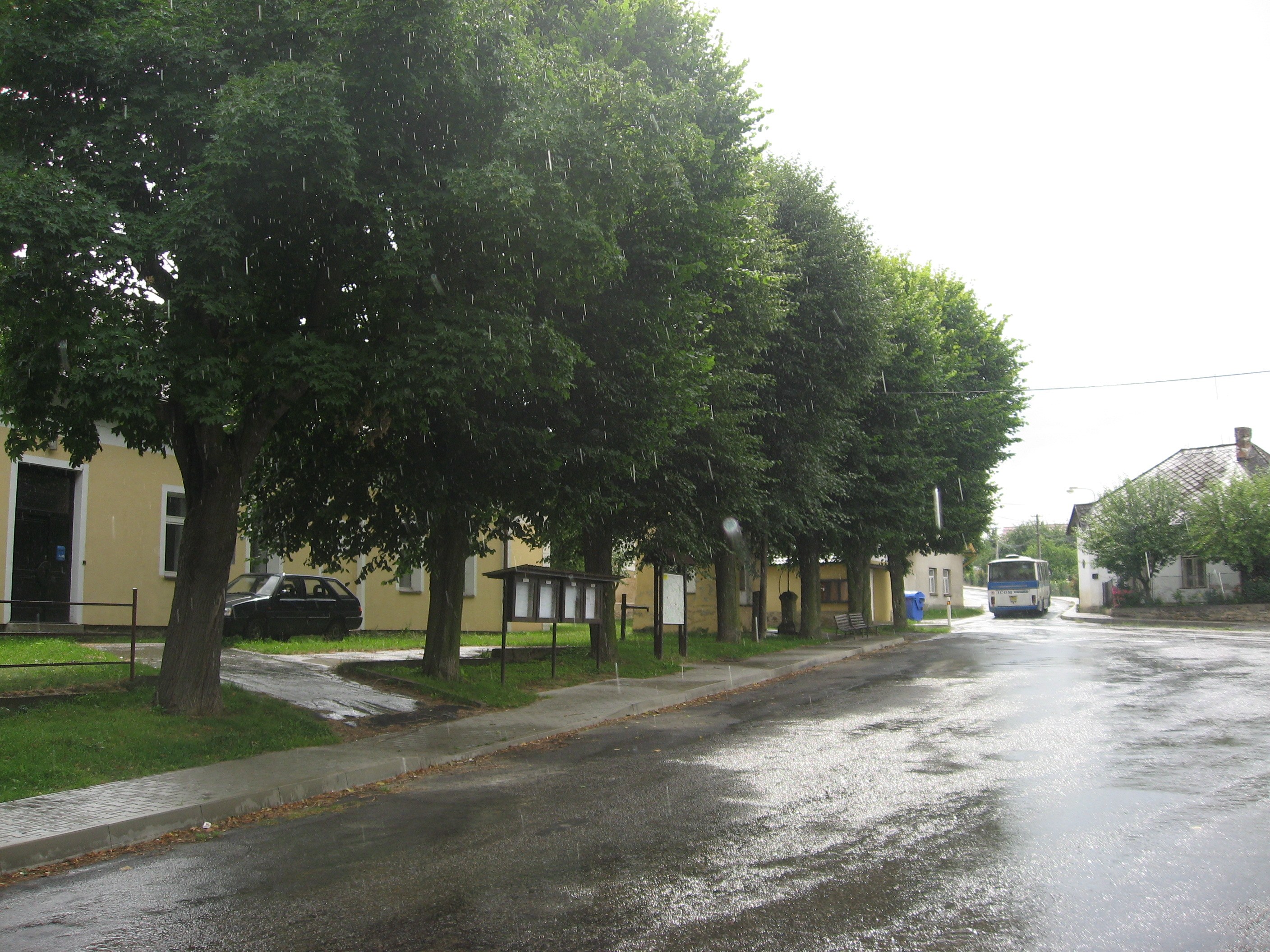
- Centre of Sedlice

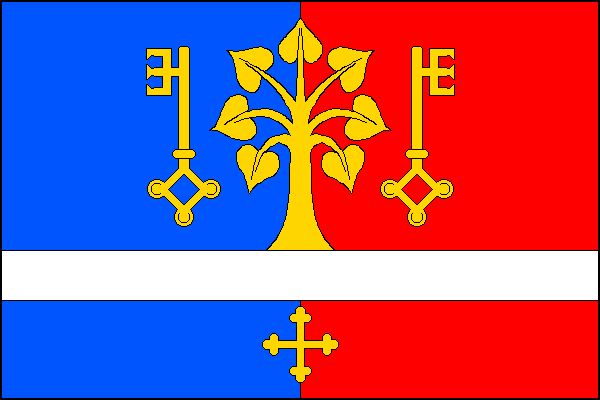
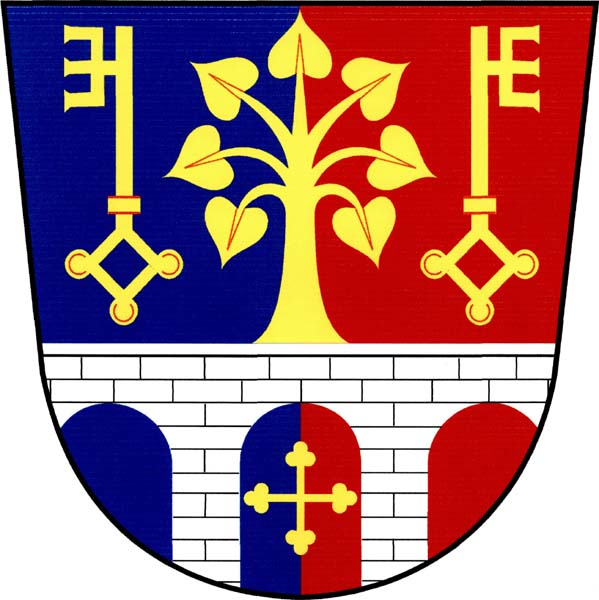
- Flag Coat of arms

- Location in the Czech Republic
- Coordinates: 49°30′55″N 15°15′23″E
- Country: Czech Republic
- Region: Vysočina
- District: Pelhřimov
- First mentioned: 1226

Area
  - Total: 5.52 km^{2} (2.13 sq mi)
- Elevation: 486 m (1,594 ft)

Population (2026-01-01)
  - Total: 153
  - Density: 27.7/km^{2} (71.8/sq mi)
- Time zone: UTC+1 (CET)
  - Summer (DST): UTC+2 (CEST)
- Postal code: 396 01
- Website: www.obecsedlice.cz

Sedlice is a municipality and village in Pelhřimov District in the Vysočina Region of the Czech Republic. It has about 200 inhabitants.

Sedlice lies approximately 10 kilometres (6 mi) north of Pelhřimov, 27 km (17 mi) north-west of Jihlava, and 88 km (55 mi) south-east of Prague.

== Demographics ==
Historical population
Year	Pop.	±%
1869	339	—
1880	354	+4.4%
1890	343	−3.1%
1900	347	+1.2%
1910	407	+17.3%
1921	351	−13.8%
1930	332	−5.4%
1950	233	−29.8%
1961	230	−1.3%
1970	201	−12.6%
1980	190	−5.5%
1991	143	−24.7%
2001	153	+7.0%
2011	152	−0.7%
2021	150	−1.3%
Source: Censuses
