= Dubovice =

- Municipality
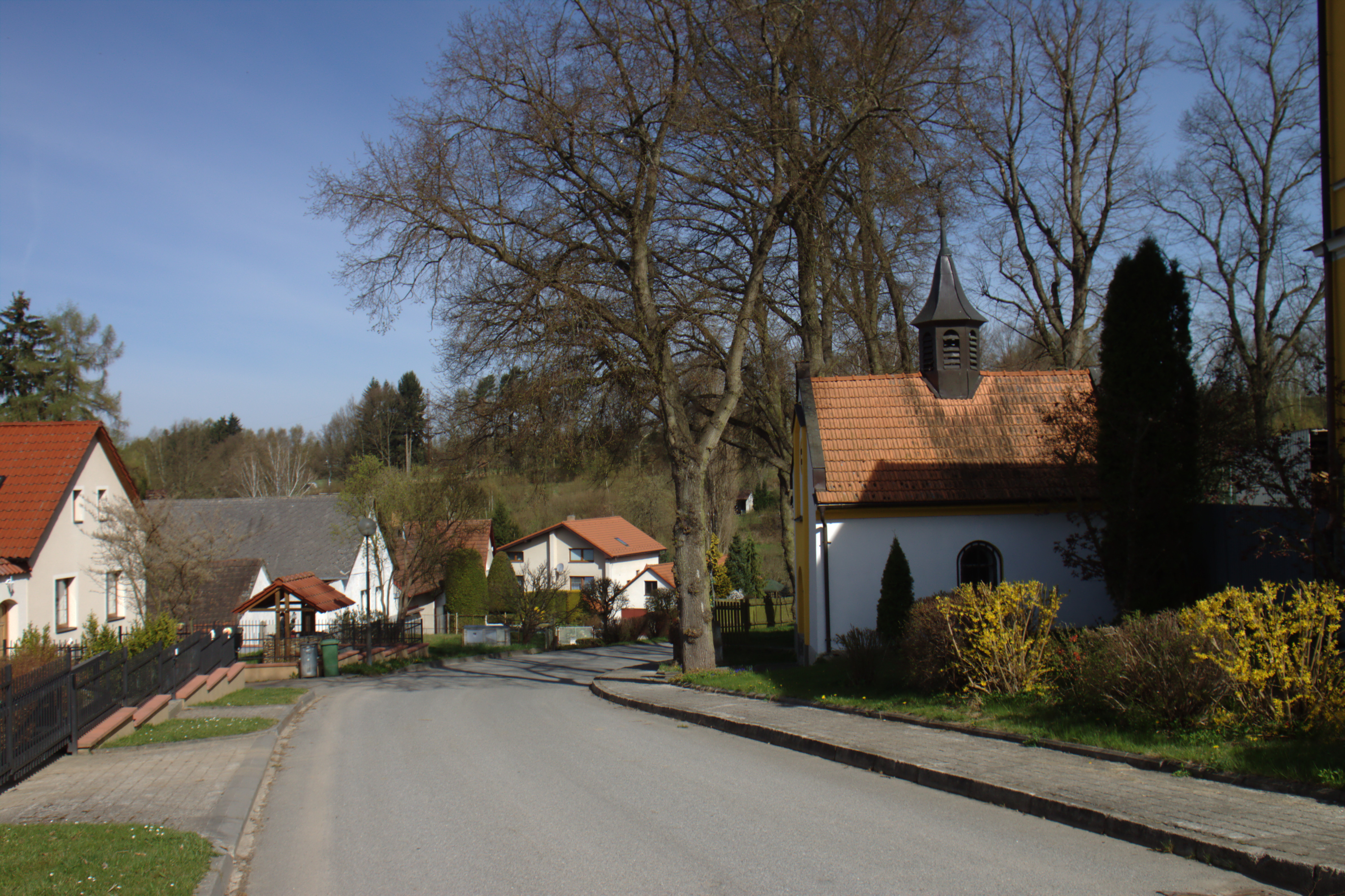
- Chapel in the centre of Dubovice

- Location in the Czech Republic
- Coordinates: 49°25′58″N 15°10′29″E
- Country: Czech Republic
- Region: Vysočina
- District: Pelhřimov
- First mentioned: 1379

Area
  - Total: 3.04 km^{2} (1.17 sq mi)
- Elevation: 556 m (1,824 ft)

Population (2026-01-01)
  - Total: 79
  - Density: 26/km^{2} (67/sq mi)
- Time zone: UTC+1 (CET)
  - Summer (DST): UTC+2 (CEST)
- Postal code: 393 01
- Website: www.dubovice.cz

Dubovice is a municipality and village in Pelhřimov District in the Vysočina Region of the Czech Republic. It has about 80 inhabitants.

Dubovice lies approximately 4 kilometres (2 mi) west of Pelhřimov, 31 km (19 mi) west of Jihlava, and 91 km (57 mi) south-east of Prague.

== Demographics ==
Historical population
Year	Pop.	±%
1869	144	—
1880	148	+2.8%
1890	156	+5.4%
1900	146	−6.4%
1910	139	−4.8%
1921	137	−1.4%
1930	137	+0.0%
1950	98	−28.5%
1961	95	−3.1%
1970	88	−7.4%
1980	78	−11.4%
1991	61	−21.8%
2001	63	+3.3%
2011	72	+14.3%
2021	77	+6.9%
Source: Censuses
