= Zruč nad Sázavou =

- Town
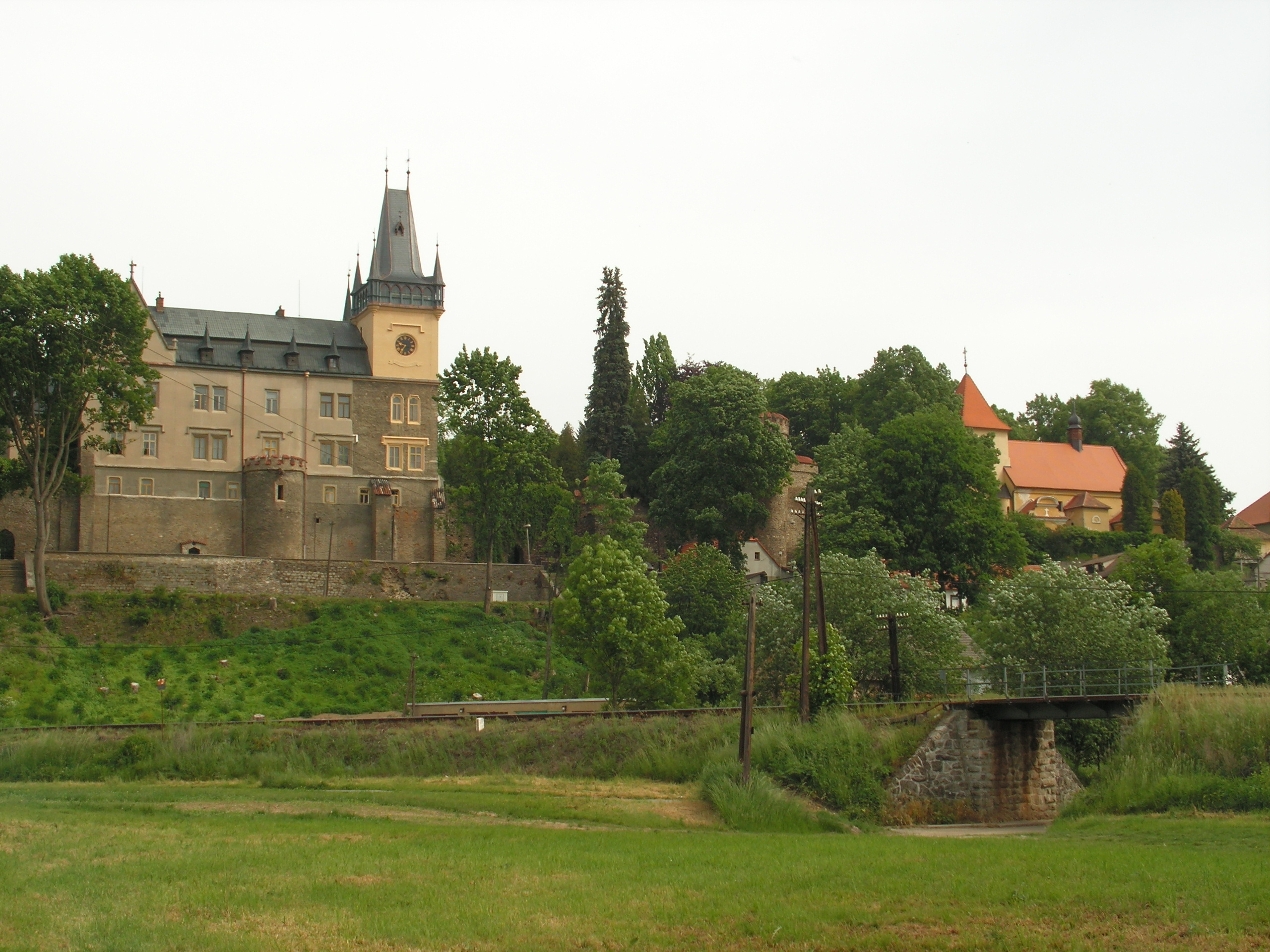
- Zruč nad Sázavou Castle

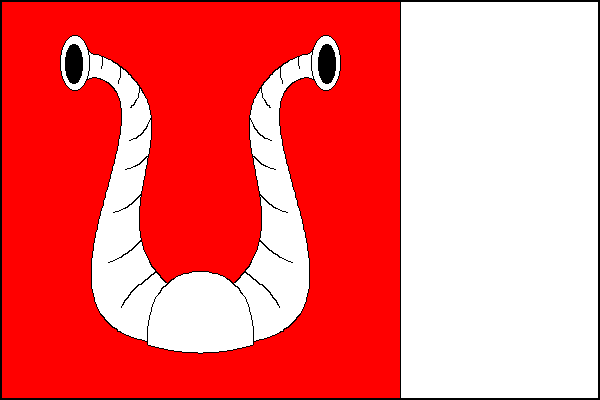
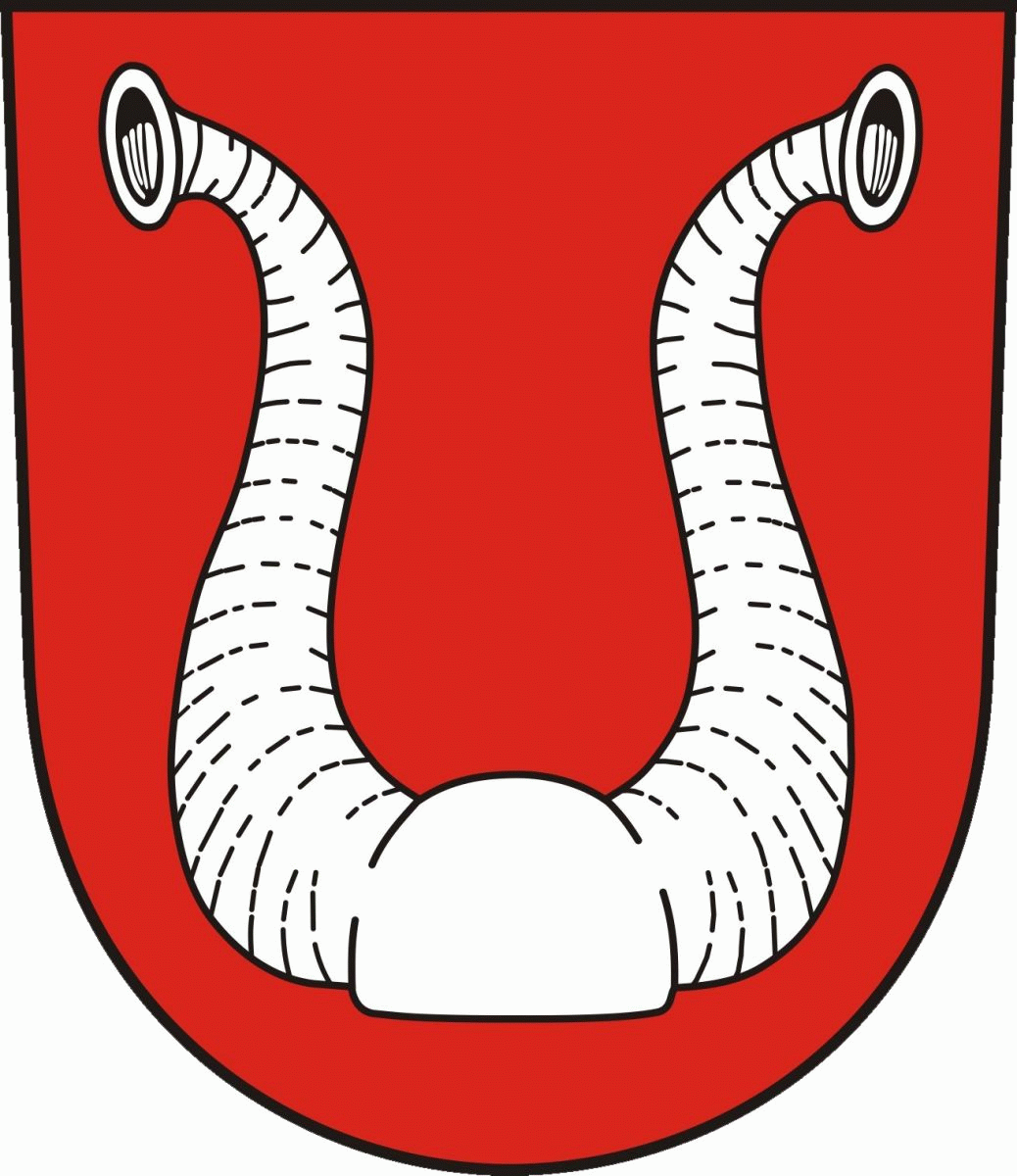
- Flag Coat of arms

- Location in the Czech Republic
- Coordinates: 49°44′25″N 15°6′22″E
- Country: Czech Republic
- Region: Central Bohemian
- District: Kutná Hora
- First mentioned: 1328

Government
  - Mayor: Martin Hujer

Area
  - Total: 16.37 km^{2} (6.32 sq mi)
- Elevation: 344 m (1,129 ft)

Population (2026-01-01)
  - Total: 4,777
  - Density: 291.8/km^{2} (755.8/sq mi)
- Time zone: UTC+1 (CET)
  - Summer (DST): UTC+2 (CEST)
- Postal code: 285 22
- Website: www.mesto-zruc.cz

Zruč nad Sázavou (Czech pronunciation: [ˈzrutʃ ˈnat saːzavou]) is a town in Kutná Hora District in the Central Bohemian Region of the Czech Republic. It has about 4,800 inhabitants. The town is located on the Sázava River and is known for the Zruč nad Sázavou Castle.

== Administrative division ==
Zruč nad Sázavou consists of five municipal parts (in brackets population according to the 2021 census):

- Zruč nad Sázavou (4,392)
- Domahoř (7)
- Dubina (59)
- Nesměřice (90)
- Želivec (68)

== Etymology ==
The name Zruč is probably derived from the Old Czech word ruče (i.e. 'fast-flowing', 'rapid'), referring to the flow of the Sázava River below the local castle.

== Geography ==
Zruč nad Sázavou is located about 25 kilometres (16 mi) south of Kutná Hora and 51 km (32 mi) southeast of Prague. It lies on the Sázava River, at the northern tip of the Švihov Reservoir. The municipal territory extends into three geomorphological regions: the largest part lies in the Křemešník Highlands, the northern part lies in the Upper Sázava Hills and the eastern part lies in the Vlašim Uplands.

== History ==
The first written mention of Zruč nad Sázavou is from 1328. The settlement was probably founded between 1032 and 1150. For a long time, it was owned by the Kolowrat family. In 1561, it was promoted to a market town and in 1662 it became a town.

After 1885, a railway was built. In 1939, Baťa company built a factory here and the town became known as an industrial centre. The footwear production lasted until 1997.

== Demographics ==
Historical population

Year	Pop.	±%
1869	1,496	—
1880	1,501	+0.3%
1890	1,463	−2.5%
1900	1,430	−2.3%
1910	1,524	+6.6%

Year	Pop.	±%
1921	1,469	−3.6%
1930	1,422	−3.2%
1950	4,191	+194.7%
1961	3,915	−6.6%
1970	4,433	+13.2%

Year	Pop.	±%
1980	4,960	+11.9%
1991	5,264	+6.1%
2001	5,020	−4.6%
2011	4,842	−3.5%
2021	4,616	−4.7%

Source: Censuses

== Transport ==
Zruč nad Sázavou is located on the railway lines Kutná Hora–Zruč nad Sázavou and Ledeč nad Sázavou–Čerčany.

== Sights ==
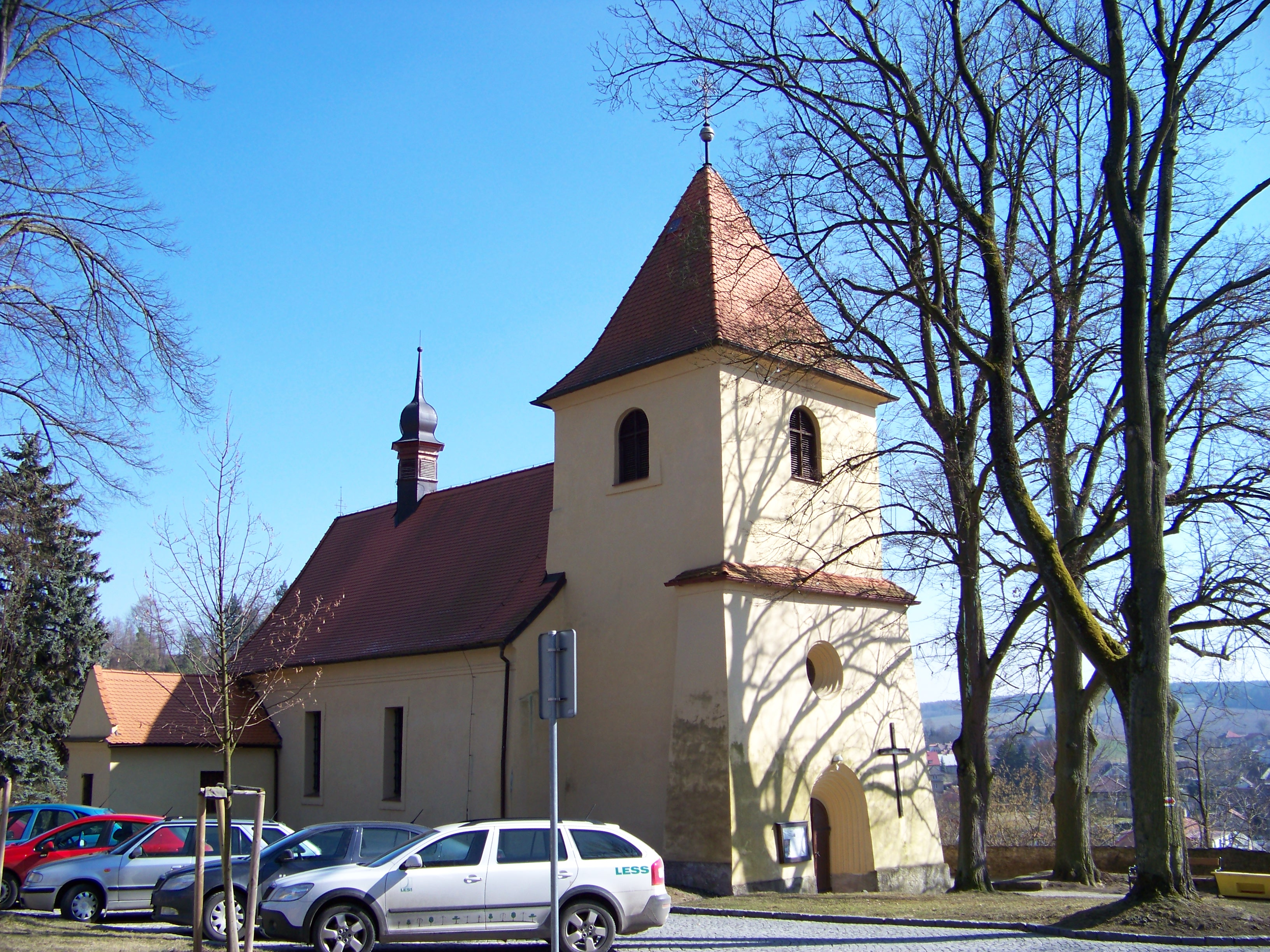
Church of the Exaltation of the Holy Cross

The main landmark of the town is the Zruč nad Sázavou Castle, which is as old as the town. In 1781, the castle, especially the interiors, burned down. It was rebuilt to its present pseudo-Gothic form in 1892–1894. Today it is owned by the town and serves as the town hall and as an art gallery. The southern wing is open to the public and contains several expositions.

The Church of the Exaltation of the Holy Cross was originally built in the early Gothic style. The tower was added in the 16th century. The church was modified in the Baroque style and reconstructed in 1788 after a fire in 1781, but retained its Gothic character.

== Notable people ==
- Petr Linhart (born 1990), handball player
