= Trnava (Želivka) =

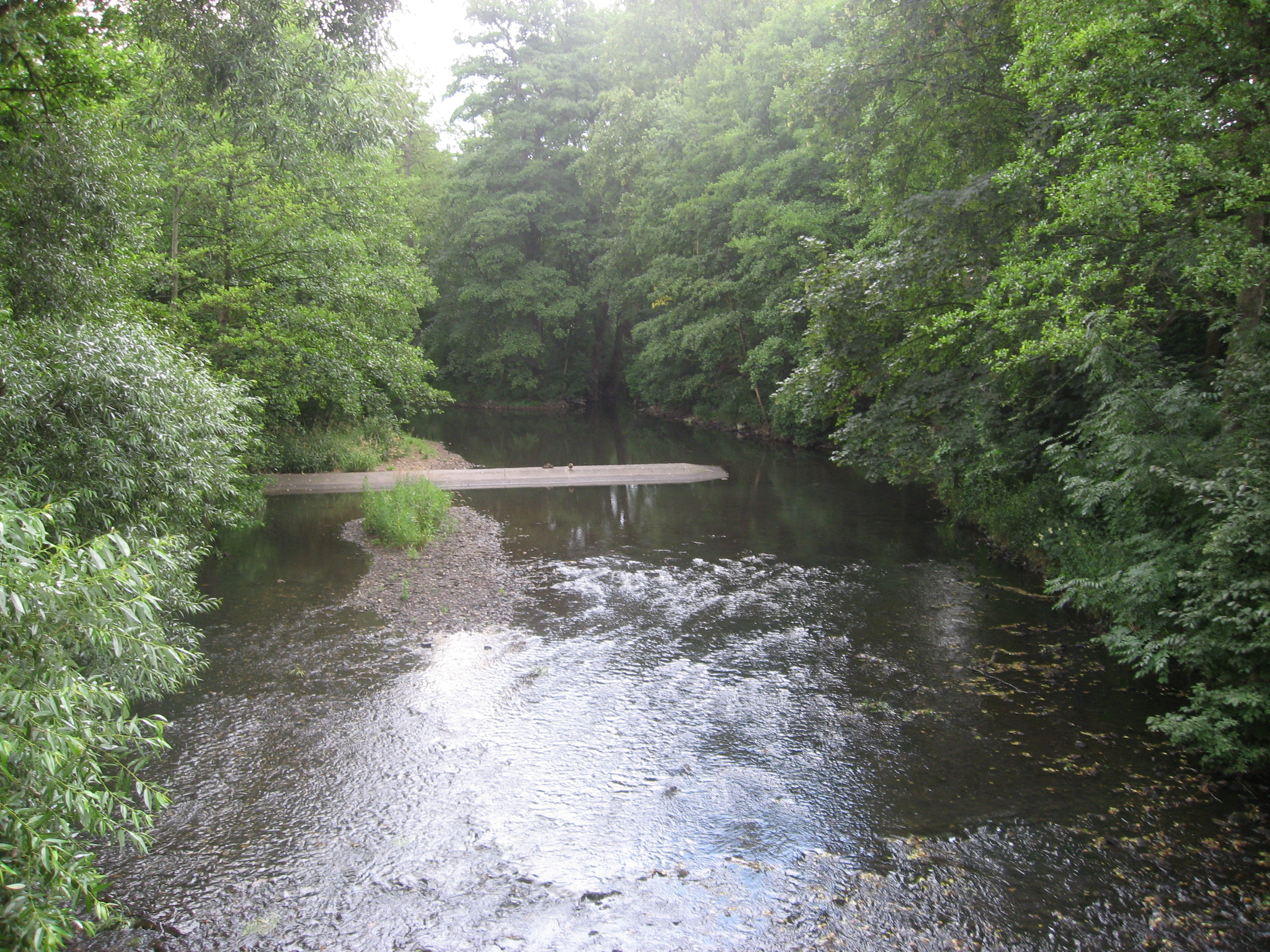
- The Trnava in Želiv

Location
- Country: Czech Republic
- Regions: Vysočina; South Bohemian

Physical characteristics
- Source
  - location: Vodice, Křemešník Highlands
  - coordinates: 49°28′2″N 14°50′52″E
  - elevation: 678 m (2,224 ft)
- Mouth
  - location: Želivka
  - coordinates: 49°21′24″N 16°24′17″E
  - elevation: 393 m (1,289 ft)
- Length: 56.3 km (35.0 mi)
- Basin size: 340.1 km^{2} (131.3 sq mi)
- Discharge
  - average: 2.06 m^{3}/s (73 cu ft/s) near estuary

Basin features
- Progression: Želivka→ Sázava→ Vltava→ Elbe→ North Sea

The Trnava (Czech pronunciation: [ˈtr̩nava]) is a river in the Czech Republic, a left tributary of the Želivka River. It flows through the Vysočina and South Bohemian regions. It is 56.3 km (35.0 mi) long.

== Etymology ==
The name is derived from the Czech word trn ('thorn'), meaning "the river flowing through thorns (thorny bushes)".

== Characteristic ==
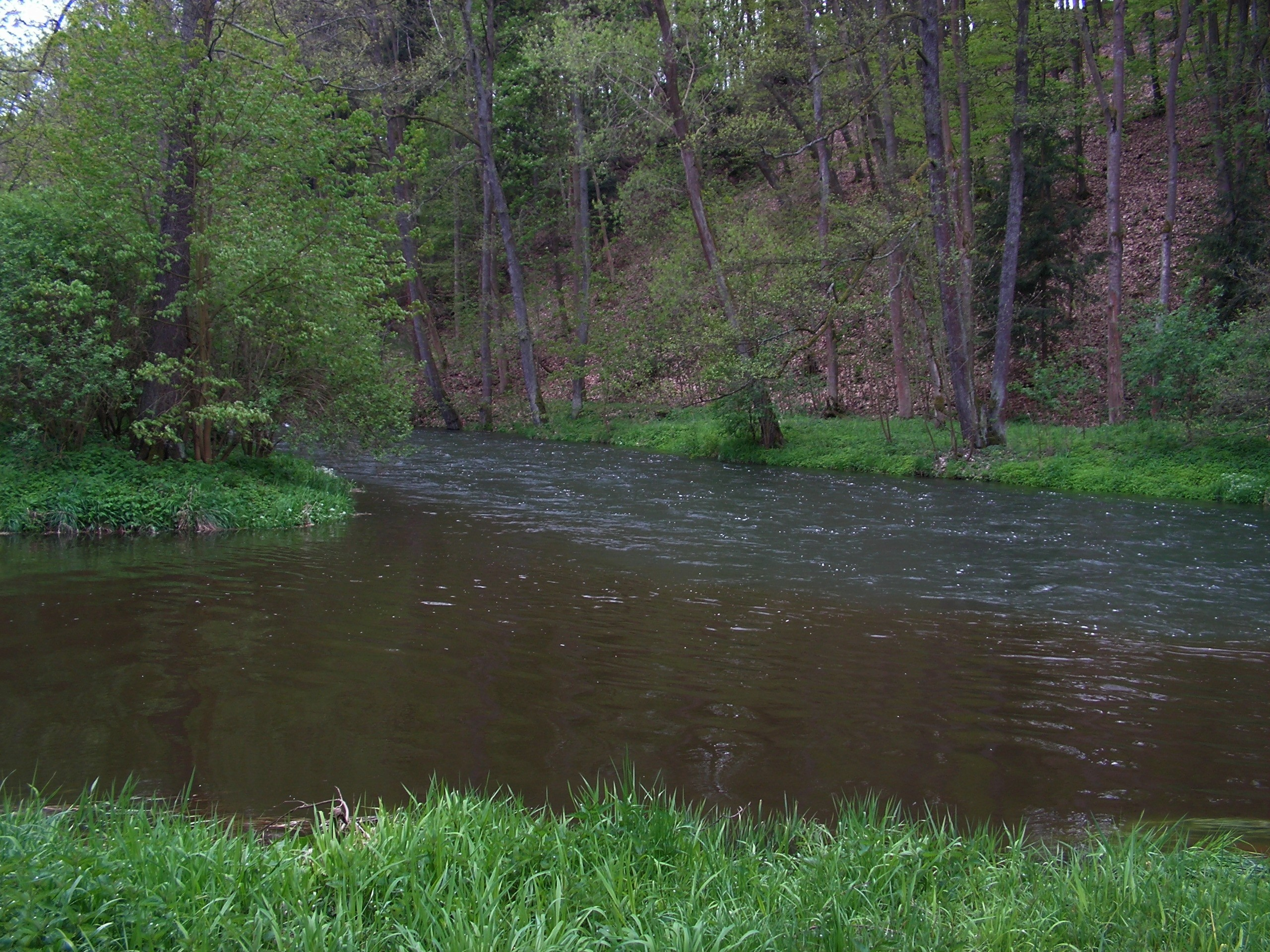
Confluence of the Trnava (back) and Želivka (front)

The Trnava originates in the territory of Vodice in the Křemešník Highlands at an elevation of 678 m (2,224 ft) and flows to Želiv, where it enters the Želivka River at an elevation of 393 m (1,289 ft). It is 56.3 km (35.0 mi) long. Its drainage basin has an area of 340.1 km^{2} (131.3 sq mi).

The longest tributaries of the Trnava are:

Tributary	Length (km)	River km	Side
Kejtovský potok	22.1	23.7	right
Bořetický potok	11.8	19.4	right
Novomlýnský potok	8.9	44.3	left
Barborka	8.1	41.1	left

== Course ==
The river flows through the municipal territories of Vodice, Dolní Hořice, Cetoraz, Pacov, Zhořec, Těchobuz, Salačova Lhota, Bratřice, Velká Chyška, Samšín, Lesná, Hořepník, Bořetice, Rovná, Arneštovice, Křelovice, Červená Řečice and Želiv.

In almost its entire length, the Trnava passes through a 100–200 m wide valley with steep, mostly wooded slopes.

== Bodies of water ==
There are 515 bodies of water in the basin area. The largest of them is the Trnávka Reservoir, built on the Trnava near its mouth. It was built in 1977–1981 on an area of 98 ha (240 acres). The main purpose of the reservoir is to capture alluvium brought by the water flow into the Švihov Reservoir. Several fishponds are built on the upper course of the river.

== Sport ==
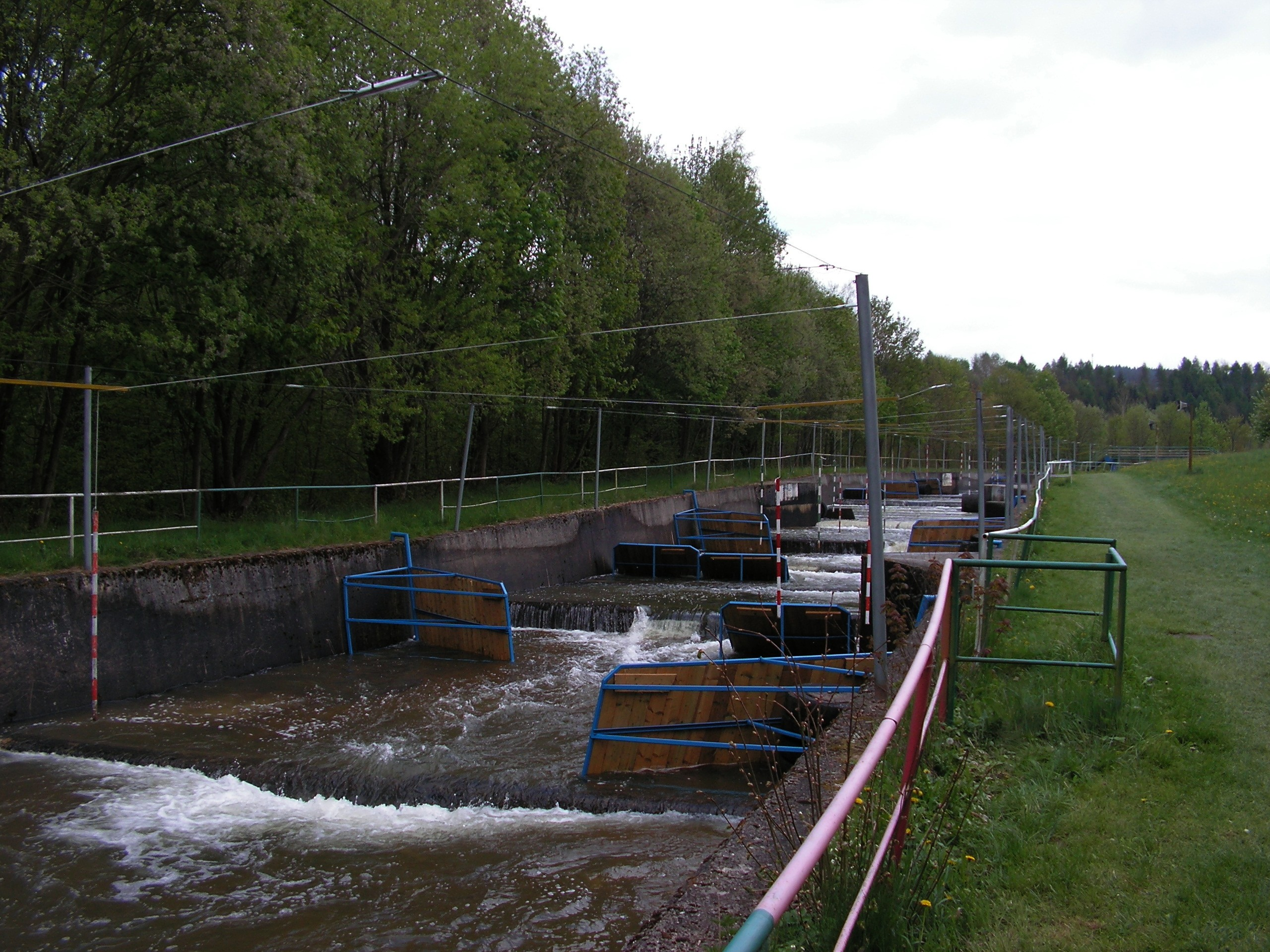
Trnávka Slalom Channel

In the section between the Trnávka Reservoir and the mouth of the river to the Želivka, there is the Trnávka Slalom Channel. It is considered the most difficult slalom channel in the Czech Republic. Since 2014, there has been an annual event known as the Trnava X-race, which is an extreme kayak and canoe race.

== See also ==
- List of rivers of the Czech Republic
