= Arneštovice =

- Municipality
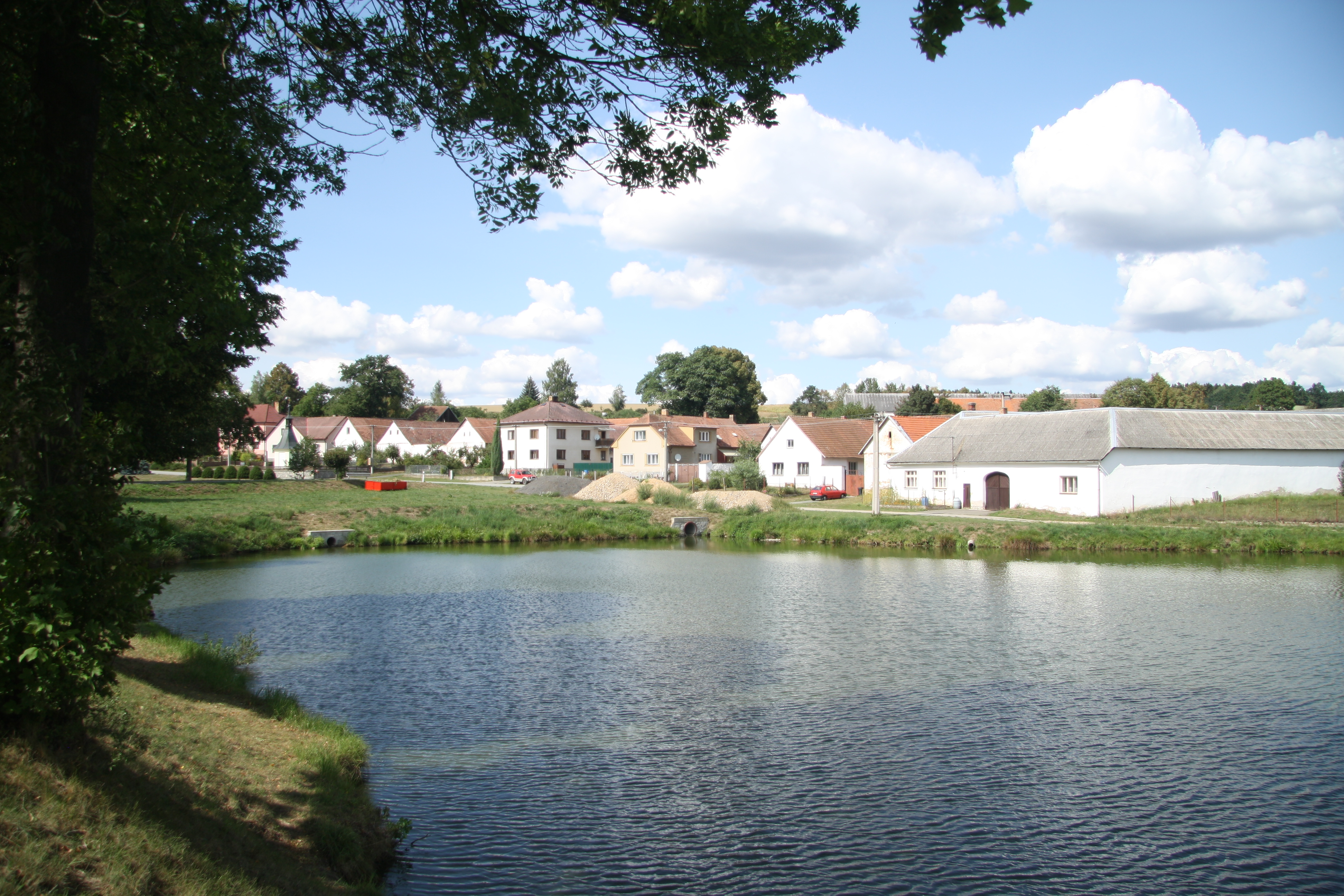
- Centre of Arneštovice

- Location in the Czech Republic
- Coordinates: 49°31′57″N 15°7′4″E
- Country: Czech Republic
- Region: Vysočina
- District: Pelhřimov
- First mentioned: 1403

Area
  - Total: 5.42 km^{2} (2.09 sq mi)
- Elevation: 489 m (1,604 ft)

Population (2026-01-01)
  - Total: 92
  - Density: 17/km^{2} (44/sq mi)
- Time zone: UTC+1 (CET)
  - Summer (DST): UTC+2 (CEST)
- Postal code: 395 01
- Website: www.arnestovice.cz

Arneštovice is a municipality and village in Pelhřimov District in the Vysočina Region of the Czech Republic. It has about 90 inhabitants.

== Etymology ==
The name is derived from the personal name Arnešt (a variation of Arnošt), meaning "the village of Arnešt's people".

== Geography ==
Arneštovice is located about 13 kilometres (8 mi) northwest of Pelhřimov and 36 km (22 mi) northwest of Jihlava. It lies in the Křemešník Highlands. The highest point is at 575 m (1,886 ft) above sea level. The Trnava River flows along the southern municipal border. In the centre of Arneštovice is a system of three small fishponds, fed by a nameless tributary of the Trnava.

== History ==
The first written mention of Arneštovice is from 1403, when the village was acquired by the Vyšehrad Chapter. In 1457 at the latest, it became part of the Loutkov (today an integral part of Hořepník) estate. Arneštovice belonged to the Loutkov estate (later known as Hořepník estate) until the establishment of an independent municipality in 1849 and shared its owners.

From April 1976 to June 1990, Arneštovice was a municipal part of Košetice. Since 1990, it has been a separate municipality again.

== Demographics ==
Historical population

Year	Pop.	±%
1869	237	—
1880	245	+3.4%
1890	247	+0.8%
1900	245	−0.8%
1910	259	+5.7%

Year	Pop.	±%
1921	265	+2.3%
1930	217	−18.1%
1950	180	−17.1%
1961	165	−8.3%
1970	154	−6.7%

Year	Pop.	±%
1980	101	−34.4%
1991	88	−12.9%
2001	81	−8.0%
2011	88	+8.6%
2021	87	−1.1%

Source: Censuses

== Transport ==
There are no railways or major roads passing through the municipality.

== Sights ==
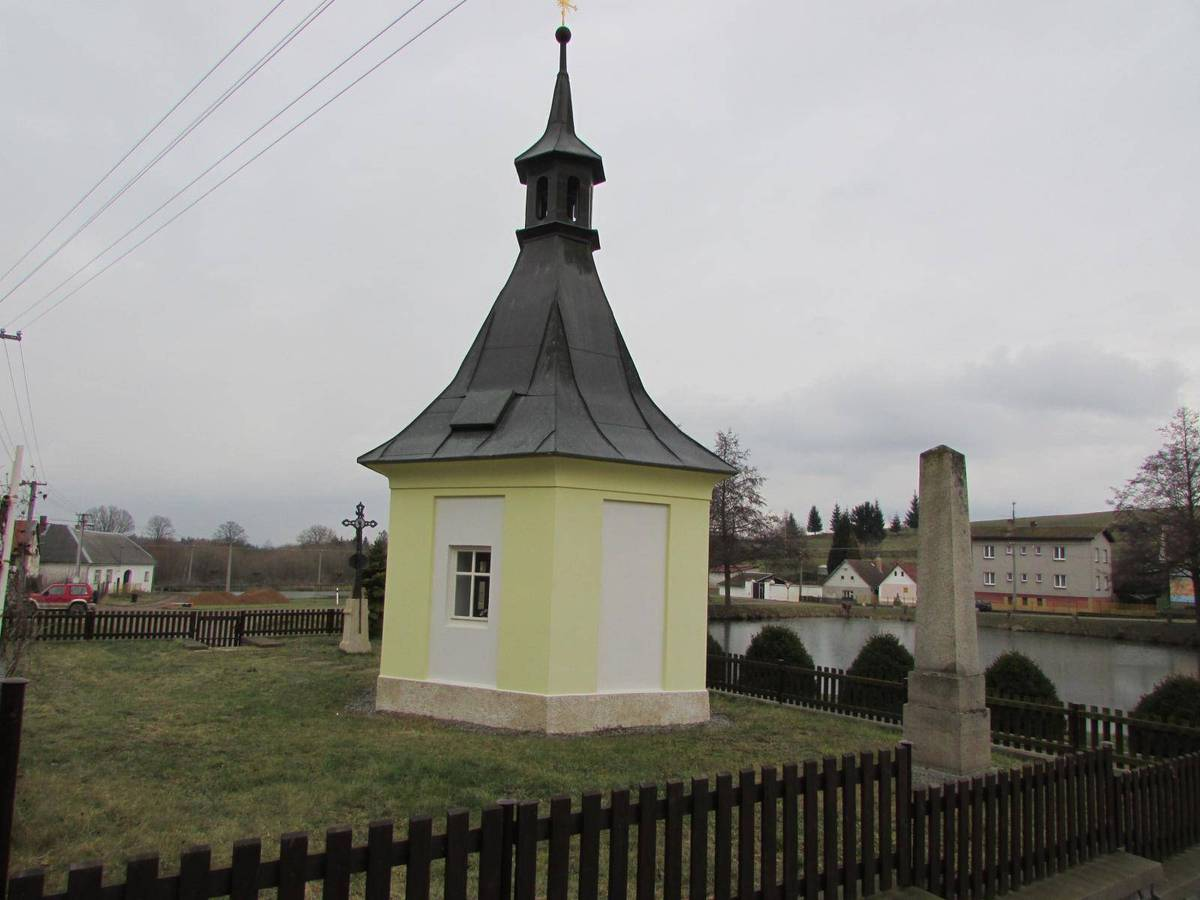
Chapel of the Virgin Mary

Among the protected cultural monuments in the municipality are the Chapel of the Virgin Mary from 1848 and a granite milestone, which is a document of road markings after the introduction of the metric system in the Czech lands.
