= Bořetice =

Bořetice may refer to places in the Czech Republic:

- Bořetice (Břeclav District), a municipality and village in the South Moravian Region
- Bořetice (Pelhřimov District), a municipality and village in the Vysočina Region
- Bořetice, a village and part of Červené Pečky in the Central Bohemian Region
- Bořetice, a village and part of Neustupov in the Central Bohemian Region
