= Bořetice (Pelhřimov District) =

- Municipality
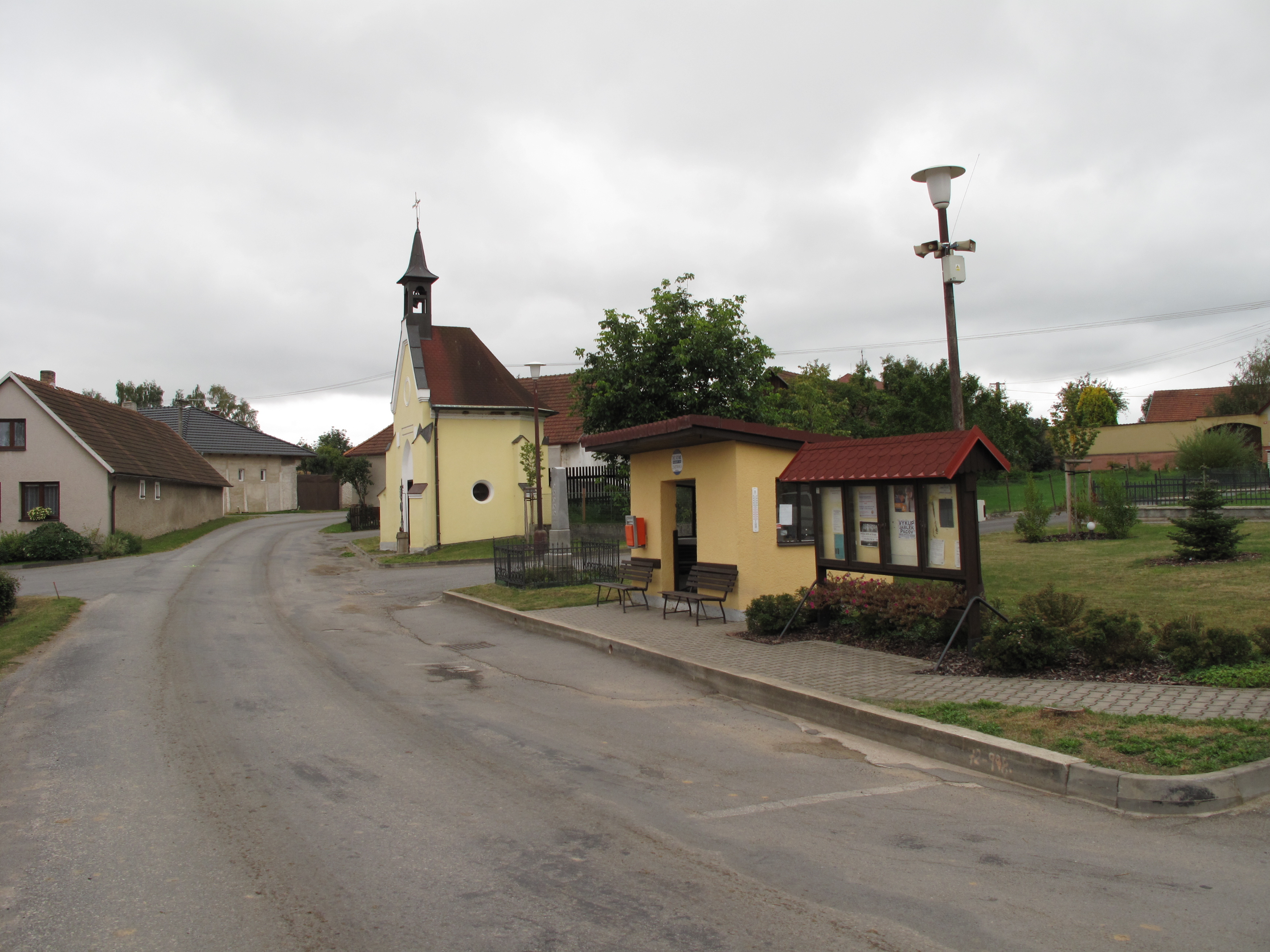
- Centre of Bořetice

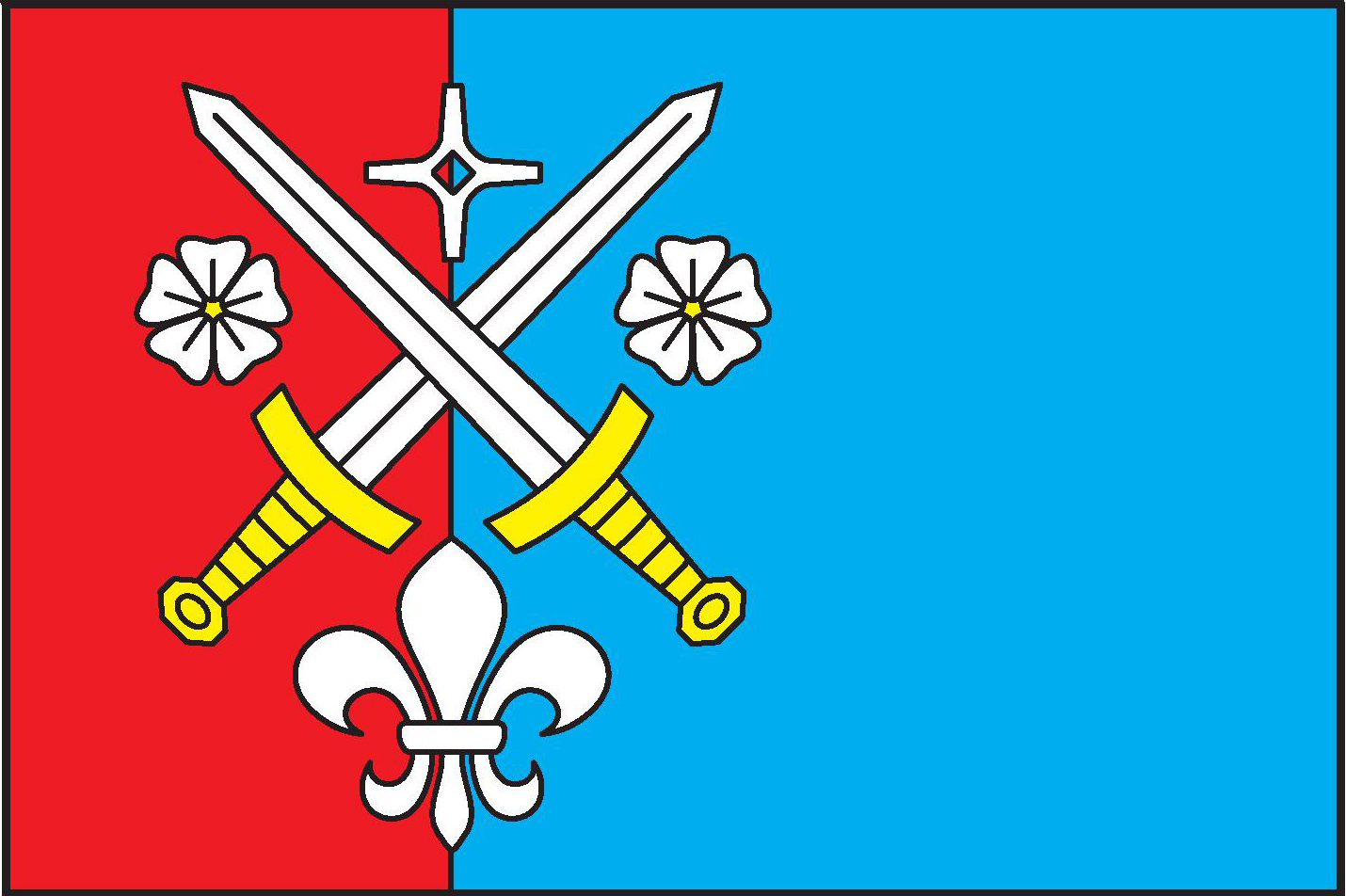
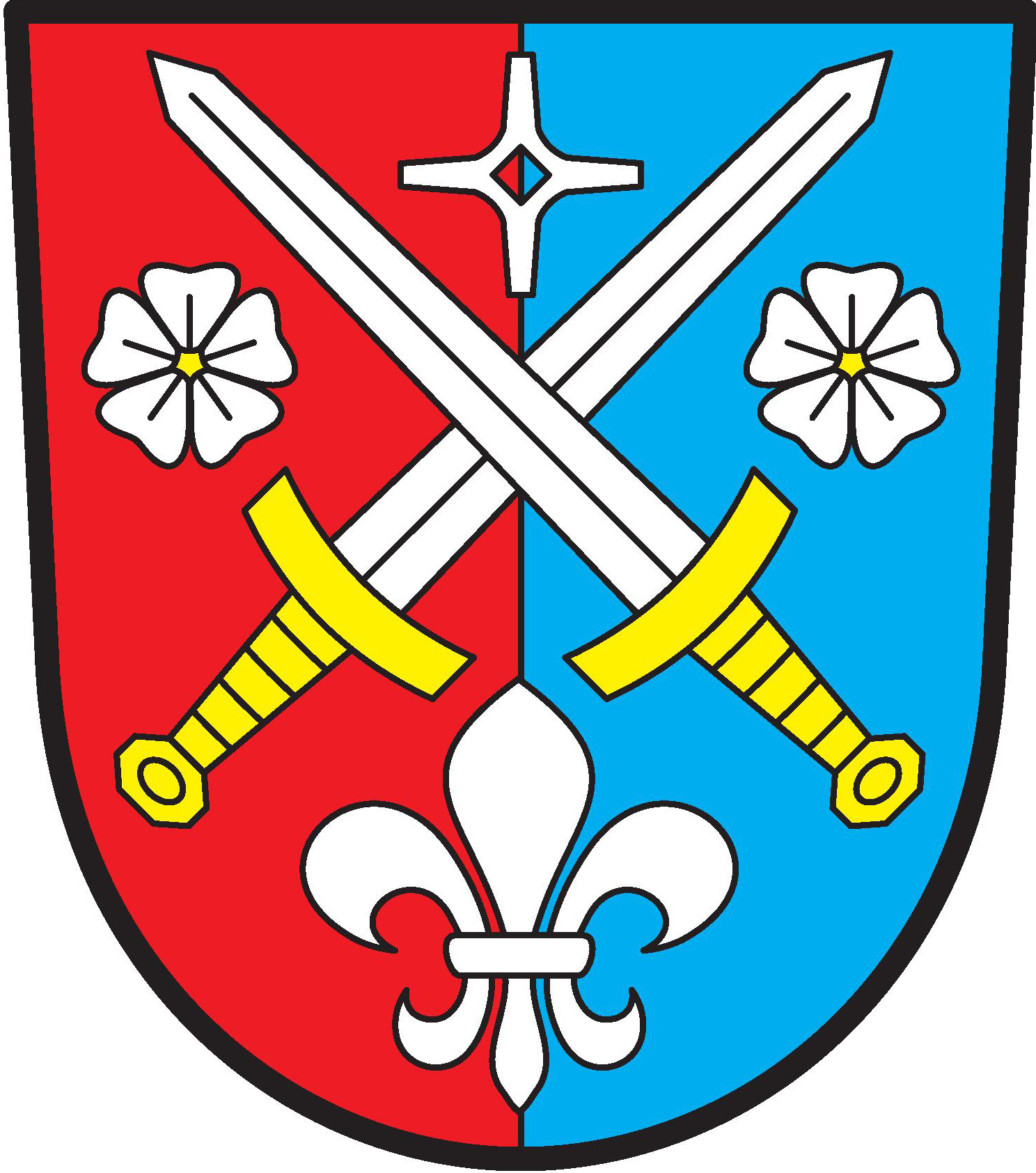
- Flag Coat of arms

- Location in the Czech Republic
- Coordinates: 49°29′46″N 15°6′36″E
- Country: Czech Republic
- Region: Vysočina
- District: Pelhřimov
- First mentioned: 1360

Area
  - Total: 3.59 km^{2} (1.39 sq mi)
- Elevation: 500 m (1,600 ft)

Population (2026-01-01)
  - Total: 99
  - Density: 28/km^{2} (71/sq mi)
- Time zone: UTC+1 (CET)
  - Summer (DST): UTC+2 (CEST)
- Postal code: 395 01
- Website: boretice.info

Bořetice is a municipality and village in Pelhřimov District in the Vysočina Region of the Czech Republic. It has about 100 inhabitants.

== Etymology ==
The name Bořetice is derived from the personal name Bořata, meaning "the village of Bořata's people".

== Geography ==
Bořetice is located about 10 kilometres (6 mi) northwest of Pelhřimov and 35 km (22 mi) west of Jihlava. It lies in the Křemešník Highlands. The highest point is at 545 m (1,788 ft) above sea level. The stream Bořetický potok flows along the eastern municipal border, near the village. The Trnava River briefly flows along the northwestern municipal border.

== History ==
The first written mention of Bořetice is from 1360. During its early history, the village belonged to the Červená Řečice estate. In the late 16th and early 17th century, the village was owned by various lesser nobles. In 1619, Bořetice was a property of the Wratislaw of Mitrovice family.

Between 1869 and 1910, Bořetice was a municipal part of Březina. From 1921 at the latest, Bořetice is a separate municipality. In 1935, electricity was introduced to the village.

== Demographics ==
Historical population

Year	Pop.	±%
1869	187	—
1880	192	+2.7%
1890	221	+15.1%
1900	187	−15.4%
1910	194	+3.7%

Year	Pop.	±%
1921	180	−7.2%
1930	162	−10.0%
1950	120	−25.9%
1961	126	+5.0%
1970	123	−2.4%

Year	Pop.	±%
1980	103	−16.3%
1991	85	−17.5%
2001	70	−17.6%
2011	68	−2.9%
2021	67	−1.5%

Source: Censuses

== Transport ==
There are no railways or major roads passing through the municipality.

== Sights ==
There are no protected cultural monuments in the municipality. The main landmark of Bořetice is a Neo-Gothic chapel from the second half of the 19th century.
