= Křelovice =

Křelovice may refer to places in the Czech Republic:

- Křelovice (Pelhřimov District), a municipality and village in the Vysočina Region
- Křelovice (Plzeň-North District), a municipality and village in the Plzeň Region
