= Bácovice =

- Municipality
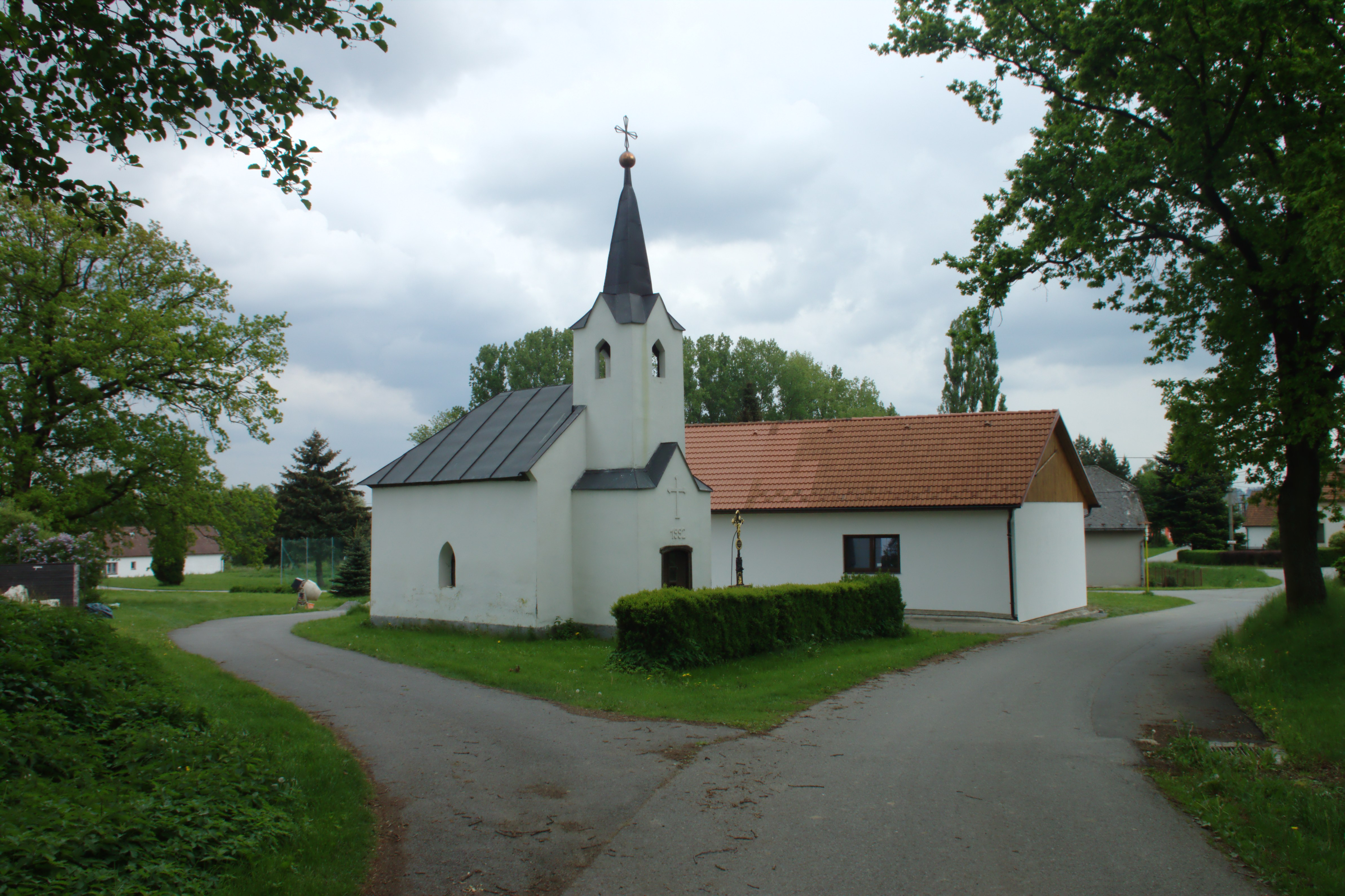
- Centre of Bácovice

- Location in the Czech Republic
- Coordinates: 49°28′36″N 15°10′2″E
- Country: Czech Republic
- Region: Vysočina
- District: Pelhřimov
- First mentioned: 1379

Area
  - Total: 4.72 km^{2} (1.82 sq mi)
- Elevation: 544 m (1,785 ft)

Population (2026-01-01)
  - Total: 95
  - Density: 20/km^{2} (52/sq mi)
- Time zone: UTC+1 (CET)
  - Summer (DST): UTC+2 (CEST)
- Postal code: 393 01
- Website: www.bacovice.cz

Bácovice is a municipality and village in Pelhřimov District in the Vysočina Region of the Czech Republic. It has about 100 inhabitants.

== Etymology ==
The name Bácovice is derived from the personal name Báca, meaning "the village of Báca's people".

== Geography ==
Bácovice is located about 6 kilometres (4 mi) northwest of Pelhřimov and 31 km (19 mi) west of Jihlava. It lies in the Křemešník Highlands. The highest point is at 596 m (1,955 ft) above sea level. The Želivka River flows along the southern municipal border. There is a system of fishponds, supplied by a nameless tributary of the Želivka.

== History ==
The first written mention of Bácovice is from 1379, when 25 peasants lived here and the village belonged to the Červená Řečice estate. In the 1630s, during the Thirty Years' Wars, Bácovice was badly damaged and the population decreased to nine. During the 19th century, Bácovice was growing again, and reached its peak in 1921.

From 1975 to 1991, Bácovice was a municipal part of Červená Řečice. In 1992, it became an independent municipality again.

== Demographics ==
Historical population

Year	Pop.	±%
1869	215	—
1880	212	−1.4%
1890	197	−7.1%
1900	216	+9.6%
1910	220	+1.9%

Year	Pop.	±%
1921	227	+3.2%
1930	177	−22.0%
1950	125	−29.4%
1961	97	−22.4%
1970	95	−2.1%

Year	Pop.	±%
1980	82	−13.7%
1991	65	−20.7%
2001	65	+0.0%
2011	69	+6.2%
2021	82	+18.8%

Source: Censuses

== Transport ==
There are no railways or major roads passing through the municipality.

== Sights ==
There are no protected cultural monuments in the municipality.
