= Vodice (Tábor District) =

- Municipality
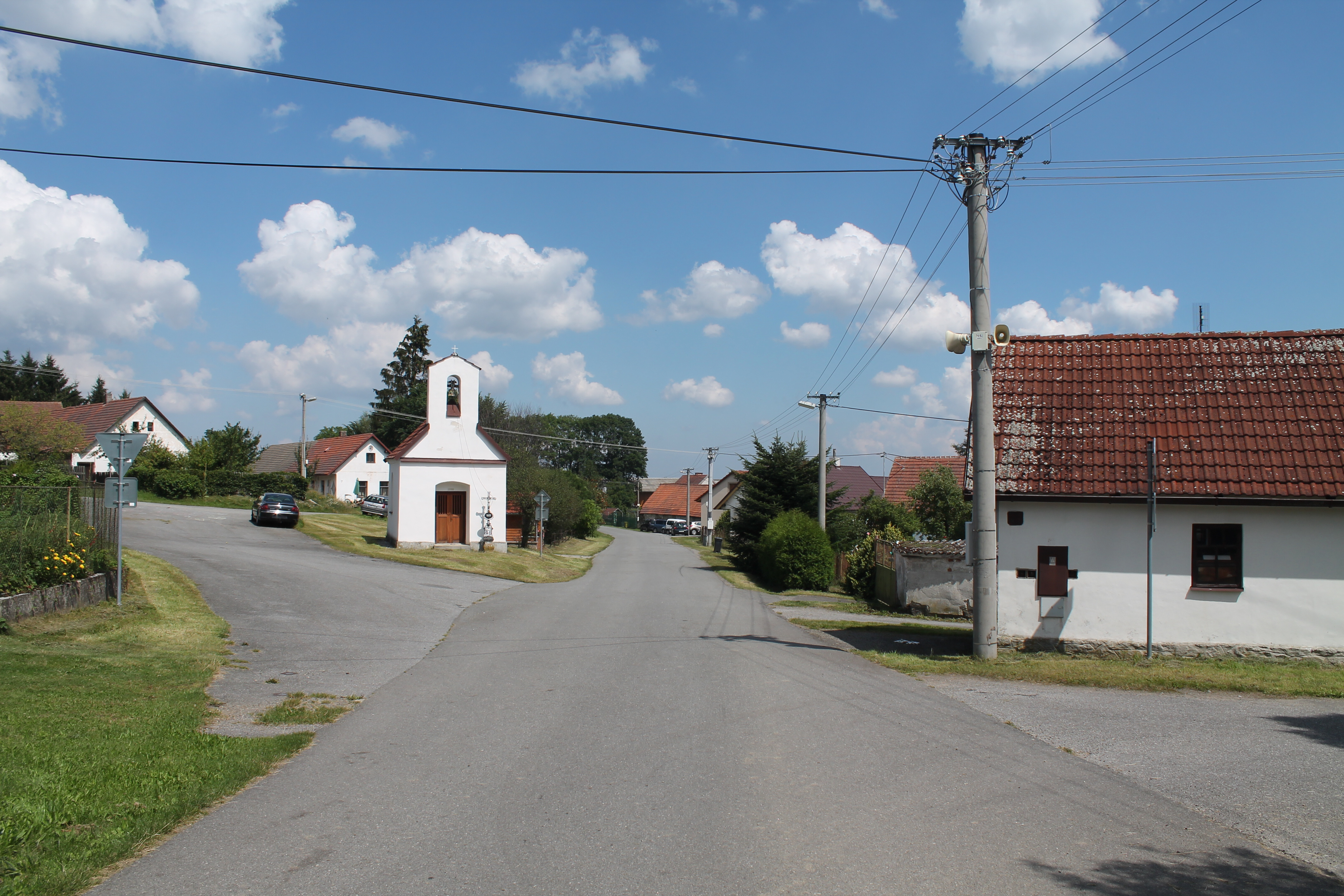
- Domamyšl, a part of Vodice

- Location in the Czech Republic
- Coordinates: 49°27′52″N 14°54′32″E
- Country: Czech Republic
- Region: South Bohemian
- District: Tábor
- First mentioned: 1432

Area
  - Total: 15.25 km^{2} (5.89 sq mi)
- Elevation: 601 m (1,972 ft)

Population (2026-01-01)
  - Total: 153
  - Density: 10.0/km^{2} (26.0/sq mi)
- Time zone: UTC+1 (CET)
  - Summer (DST): UTC+2 (CEST)
- Postal codes: 391 53, 391 55
- Website: www.obecvodice.cz

Vodice is a municipality and village in Tábor District in the South Bohemian Region of the Czech Republic. It has about 200 inhabitants.

Vodice lies approximately 20 kilometres (12 mi) east of Tábor, 64 km (40 mi) north-east of České Budějovice, and 78 km (48 mi) south-east of Prague. The Trnava River originates in the municipal territory.

== Administrative division ==
Vodice consists of six municipal parts (in brackets population according to the 2021 census):

- Vodice (54)
- Babčice (22)
- Domamyšl (33)
- Hájek (18)
- Malešín (34)
- Osikovec (4)

== Demographics ==
Historical population
| Year | Pop. | ±% |
|---|---|---|
| 1869 | 1,317 | — |
| 1880 | 1,180 | −10.4% |
| 1890 | 1,167 | −1.1% |
| 1900 | 1,102 | −5.6% |
| 1910 | 1,027 | −6.8% |
| 1921 | 1,007 | −1.9% |
| 1930 | 880 | −12.6% |
| 1950 | 575 | −34.7% |
| 1961 | 536 | −6.8% |
| 1970 | 470 | −12.3% |
| 1980 | 358 | −23.8% |
| 1991 | 271 | −24.3% |
| 2001 | 209 | −22.9% |
| 2011 | 163 | −22.0% |
| 2021 | 165 | +1.2% |
Source: Censuses
