= Těchobuz =

- Municipality
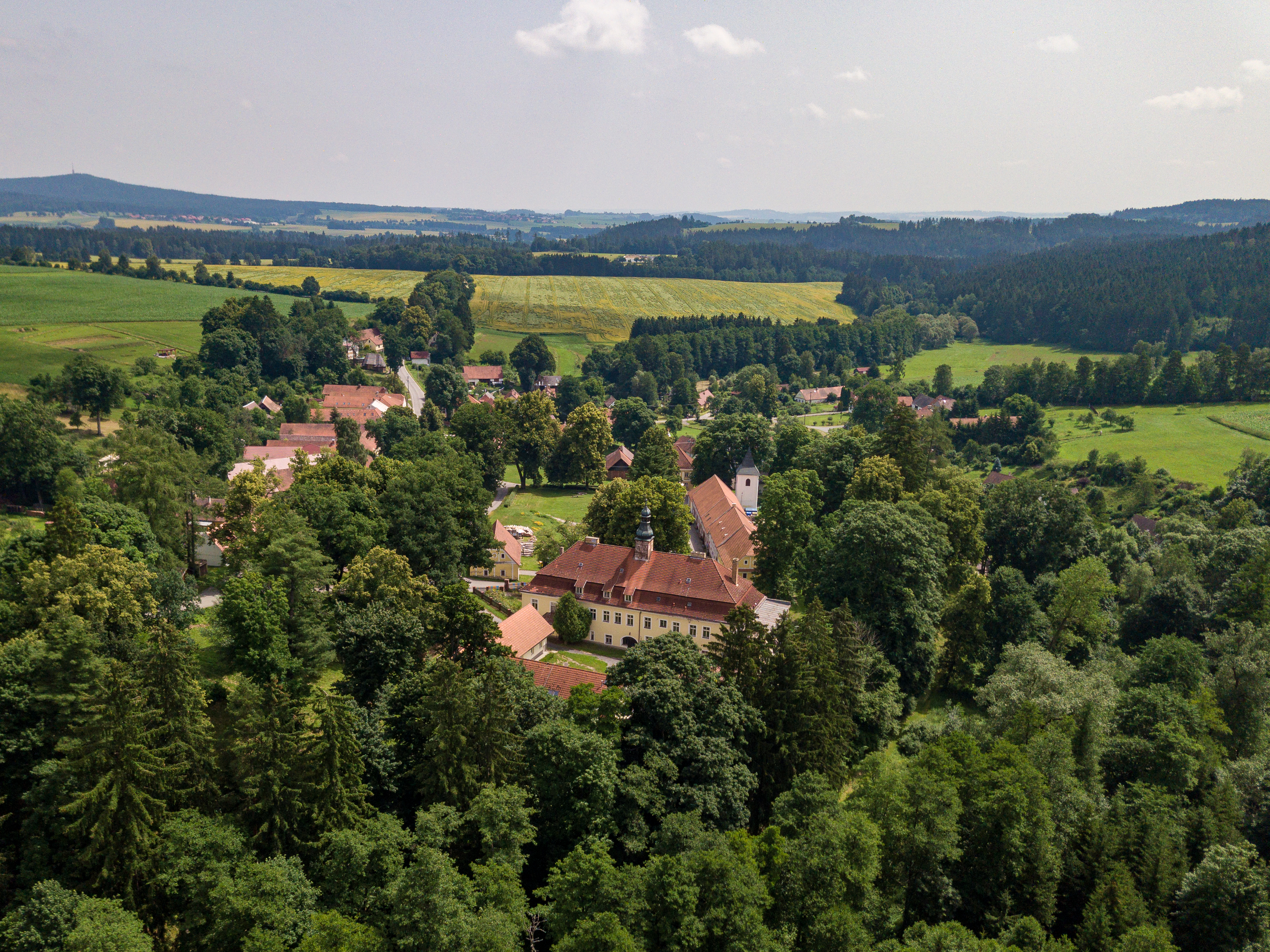
- Aerial view

- Location in the Czech Republic
- Coordinates: 49°30′37″N 14°55′50″E
- Country: Czech Republic
- Region: Vysočina
- District: Pelhřimov
- First mentioned: 1352

Area
  - Total: 7.22 km^{2} (2.79 sq mi)
- Elevation: 537 m (1,762 ft)

Population (2026-01-01)
  - Total: 77
  - Density: 11/km^{2} (28/sq mi)
- Time zone: UTC+1 (CET)
  - Summer (DST): UTC+2 (CEST)
- Postal code: 395 01
- Website: www.techobuz.cz

Těchobuz is a municipality and village in Pelhřimov District in the Vysočina Region of the Czech Republic. It has about 80 inhabitants.

== Geography ==
Těchobuz is located about 22 kilometres (14 mi) northwest of Pelhřimov and 21 km (13 mi) northeast of Tábor. It lies in the Křemešník Highlands. The highest point is at 612 m (2,008 ft) above sea level. The Barborka Stream flows through the municipality and then joins the Trnava River, which flows along the eastern municipal border. The municipal territory is rich in fishponds.

== History ==
The first written mention of Těchobuz is from 1352. Between 1390 and 1431, Těchobuz was owned by the knight Albera of Stájice. Těchobuz became the centre of a small estate and the importance of the village and the local fortress grew. Other important owners of Těchobuz included the knight Václav Otta of Los, who had a belfry built here in 1603, and the Adler family, who founded a glassworks in the mid-18th century. The glassworks was closed in 1782, restored in 1798, and finally ceased to exist in 1830.

== Demographics ==
Historical population

Year	Pop.	±%
1869	544	—
1880	537	−1.3%
1890	469	−12.7%
1900	525	+11.9%
1910	477	−9.1%

Year	Pop.	±%
1921	393	−17.6%
1930	378	−3.8%
1950	230	−39.2%
1961	224	−2.6%
1970	217	−3.1%

Year	Pop.	±%
1980	169	−22.1%
1991	148	−12.4%
2001	129	−12.8%
2011	128	−0.8%
2021	59	−53.9%

Source: Censuses

== Transport ==
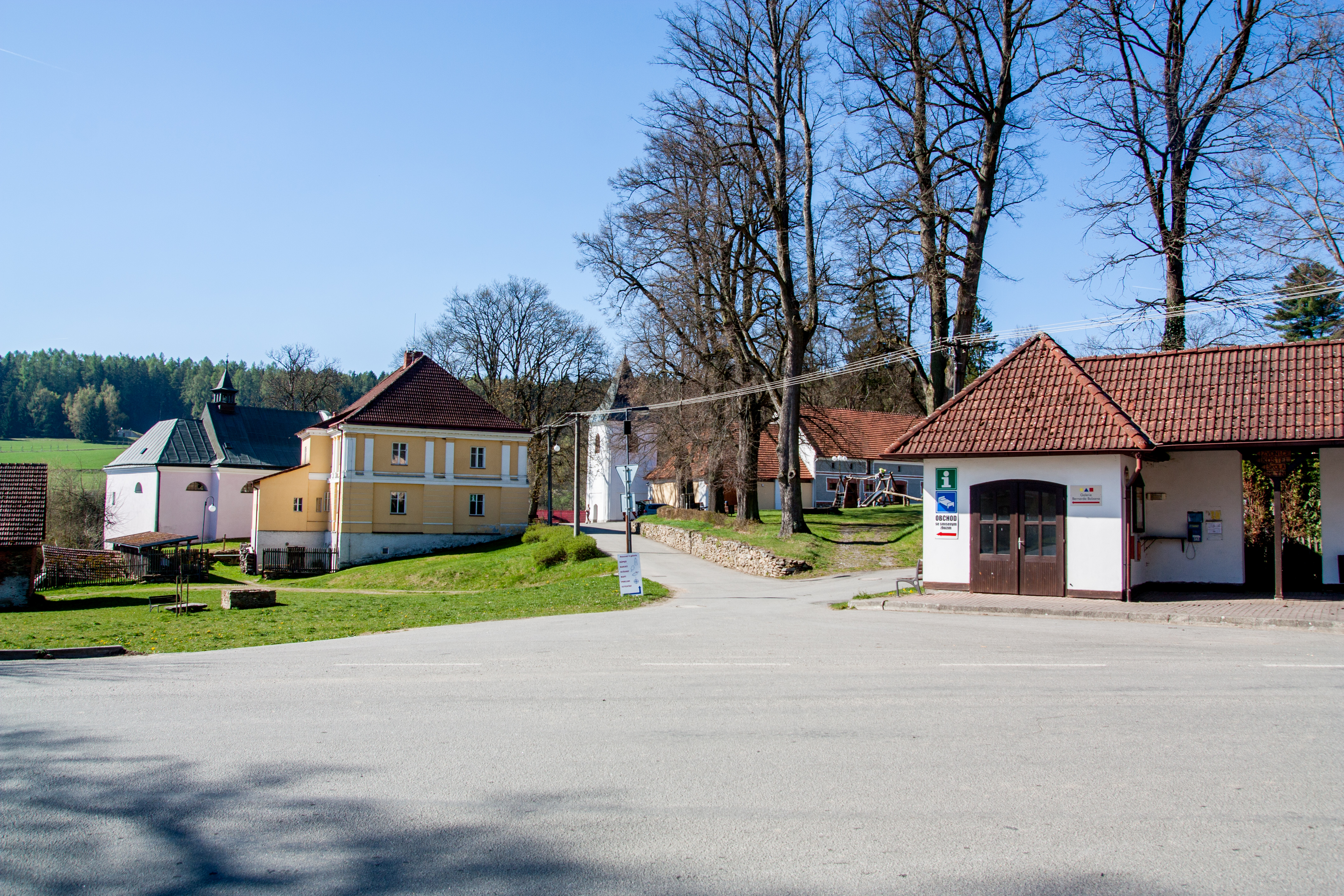
Centre of Těchobuz

There are no railways or major roads passing through the municipality.

== Sights ==
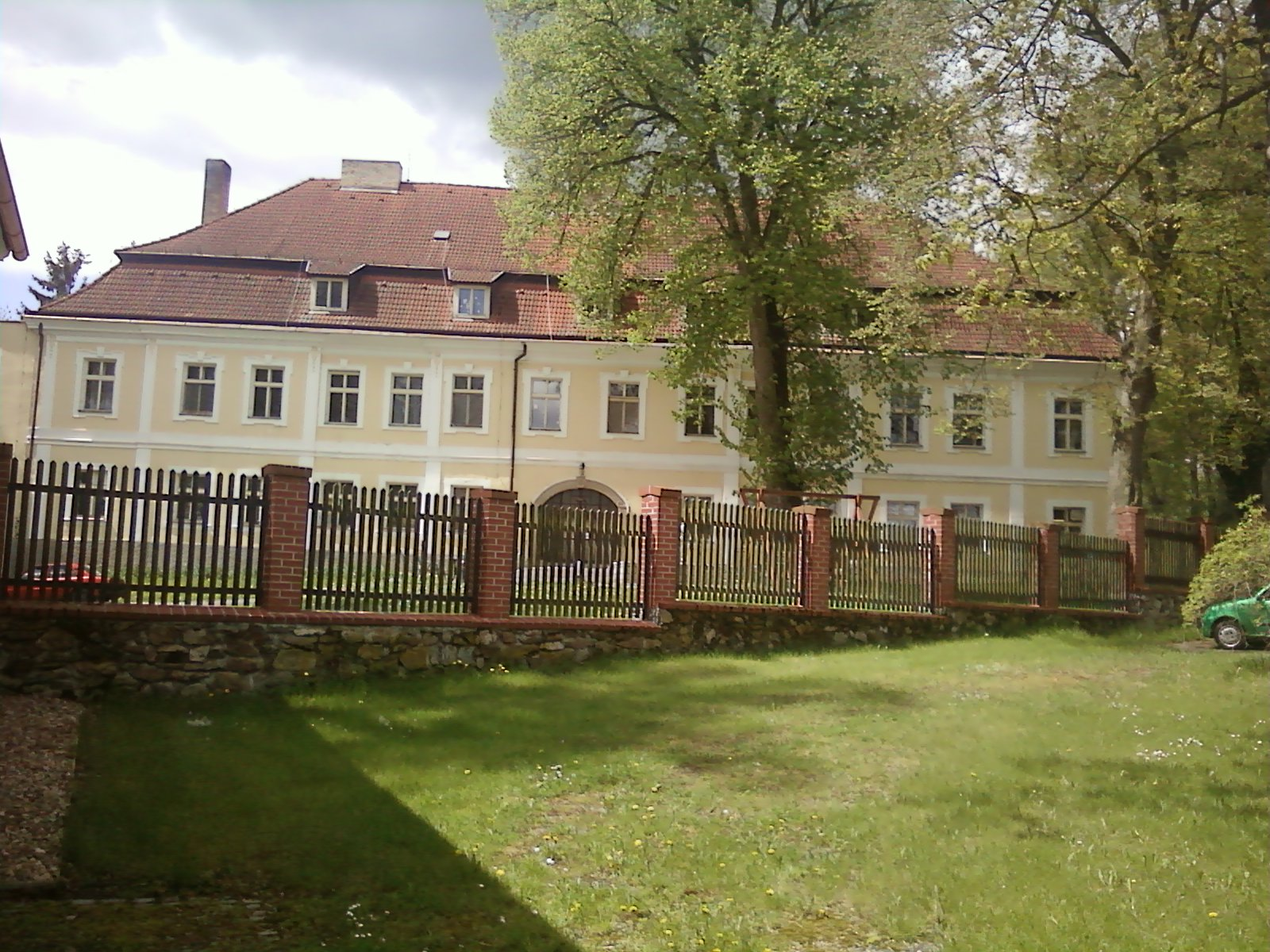
Těchobuz Castle

The main landmark is the Těchobuz Castle. The former fortress was completely rebuilt into this late Baroque castle in 1786–1798, later Neoclassical modifications were made. The castle also includes a farm yard and a large landscape park with ponds.

The Church of Saint Mark was first mentioned in 1338, earlier than the village of Těchobuz. It is a Baroque church with a Gothic core. Next to the church is a separate Renaissance bell tower.

The Chapel of Saint John of Nepomuk with mortuary was built in the Empire style in 1826.

Among other cultural monuments in the municipality are a Neoclassical granary from the early 19th century, a Neoclassical building of the former school from 1823, and a wooden barn from the turn of the 18th and 19th centuries.
