= Arnošt =

Arnošt is a Czech masculine given name. It was derived from the Old German name Ernust (modern German name Ernst), meaning 'honest', 'serious'. Notable people with the name include:

- Inocenc Arnošt Bláha (1879–1960), Czech sociologist and philosopher
- Arnošt Zvi Ehrman (1914–1976), Czech Jewish Orthodox rabbi
- Arnošt Frischer (1887–1954), Czech Jewish politician
- Arnošt Goldflam (born 1946), Czech playwright, writer, director, screenwriter and actor
- Arnošt Hájek (born 1941), Czech biathlete
- Arnošt Hložek (1929–2013), Slovak football coach and player
- Arnošt Klíma (1916–2000), Czech historian
- Arnošt Klimčík (born 1945), Czech handball player
- Arnošt Kreuz (1912–1974), Czech footballer
- Arnošt Lustig (1926–2011), Czech Jewish writer, playwright and screenwriter
- Arnošt Muka (1854–1932), German and Sorbian writer, linguist and scientist
- Arnošt Nejedlý (1883–1917), Czech long-distance runner
- Arne Novák, born Arnošt Novák (1880–1939), Czech literary historian and critic
- Arnošt of Pardubice (1297–1364), the first Archbishop of Prague
- Arnošt Pazdera (1929–2021), Czech footballer
- Arnošt Poisl (born 1939), Czech rower
- Arnošt Konstantin Růžička (1761–1845), Czech bishop
- Jan Arnošt Smoler (1816–1884), Sorbian philologist and writer
- Arnošt Valenta (1912–1944), Czech army officer

== See also ==
- Arnost, medieval Bishop of Rochester
- Ernest, an English name of the same origin
- Rudolf Těsnohlídek (1882–1928), Czech writer and poet, also known under the pen name Arnošt Bellis
- Ernst Wiesner (1890–1971), Czech architect, also known as Arnošt Wiesner
- Ernst Königsgarten (1880–1942), Austrian businessman and fencer, also known as Arnošt Königsgarten
