= Želiv =

- Municipality
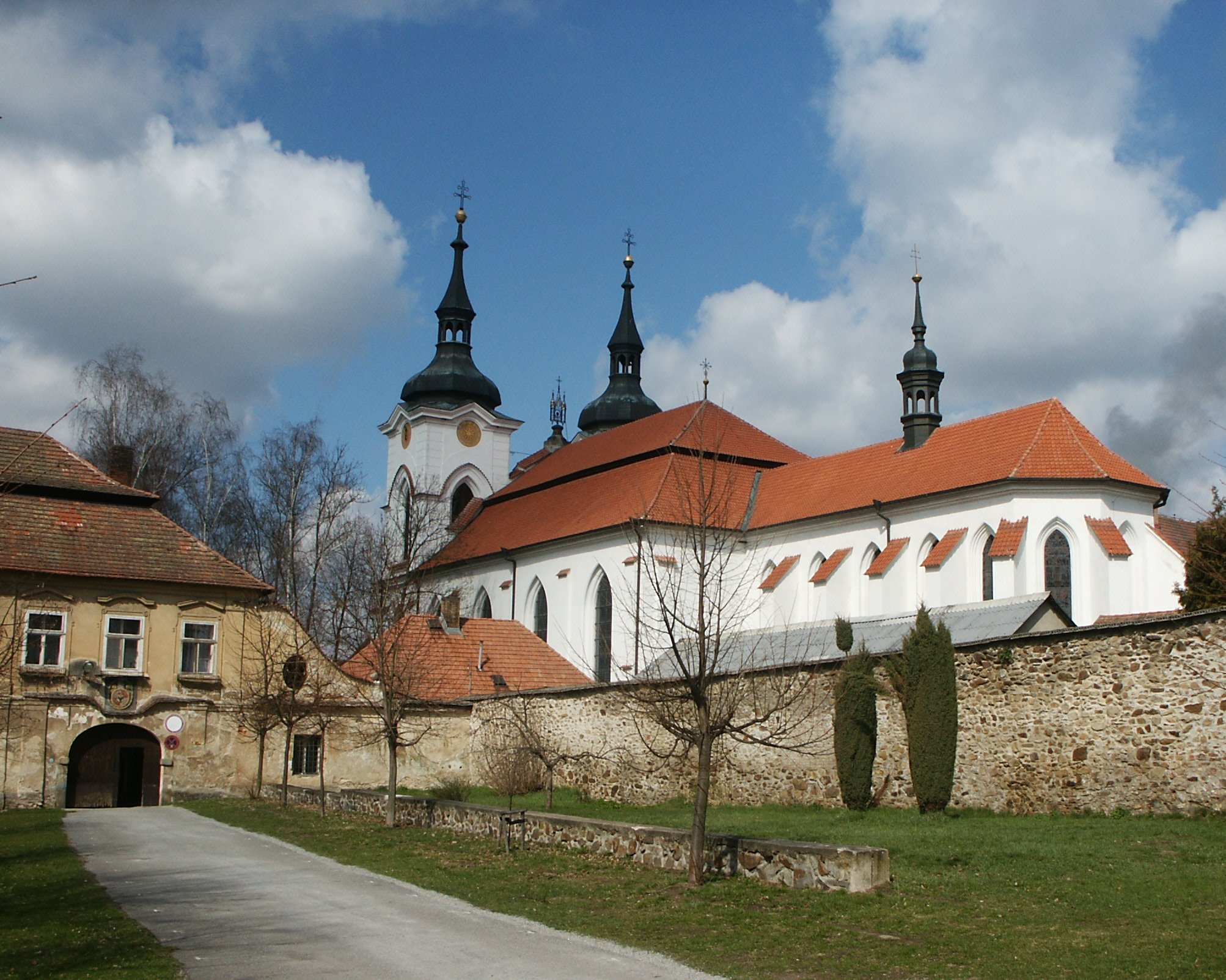
- Želiv Monastery

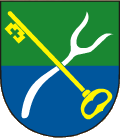
- Flag Coat of arms

- Location in the Czech Republic
- Coordinates: 49°31′48″N 15°13′19″E
- Country: Czech Republic
- Region: Vysočina
- District: Pelhřimov
- First mentioned: 1144

Area
  - Total: 26.05 km^{2} (10.06 sq mi)
- Elevation: 406 m (1,332 ft)

Population (2026-01-01)
  - Total: 1,142
  - Density: 43.84/km^{2} (113.5/sq mi)
- Time zone: UTC+1 (CET)
  - Summer (DST): UTC+2 (CEST)
- Postal code: 394 44
- Website: www.obeczeliv.cz

Želiv (German: Seelau) is a municipality and village in Pelhřimov District in the Vysočina Region of the Czech Republic. It has about 1,100 inhabitants. It is known for a Premonstratensian monastery.

== Administrative division ==
Želiv consists of eight municipal parts (in brackets population according to the 2021 census):

- Želiv (790)
- Bolechov (32)
- Brtná (91)
- Lhotice (51)
- Lískovice (16)
- Miletín (22)
- Vitice (20)
- Vřesník (103)

== Etymology ==
The name is derived from the personal name Žel (shortened variant of the name Želibor or Želislav), meaning "Žel's".

== Geography ==
Želiv is located about 11 kilometres (7 mi) north of Pelhřimov and 30 km (19 mi) northwest of Jihlava. It lies in the Křemešník Highlands. The highest point is at 540 m (1,770 ft) above sea level. The municipality is situated at the confluence of the Želivka and Trnava rivers. The Trnávka Reservoir is situated on the Trnava in the southwestern part of the municipality. The small reservoir of Vřesník is built on the Želivka River.

== History ==
The first written mention of Želiv is from 1144.

== Demographics ==
Historical population

Year	Pop.	±%
1869	1,916	—
1880	1,838	−4.1%
1890	1,850	+0.7%
1900	1,855	+0.3%
1910	1,860	+0.3%

Year	Pop.	±%
1921	1,926	+3.5%
1930	1,748	−9.2%
1950	1,418	−18.9%
1961	1,437	+1.3%
1970	1,349	−6.1%

Year	Pop.	±%
1980	1,297	−3.9%
1991	1,211	−6.6%
2001	1,165	−3.8%
2011	1,057	−9.3%
2021	1,125	+6.4%

Source: Censuses

== Transport ==
There are no railways or major roads passing through the municipality.

== Sights ==
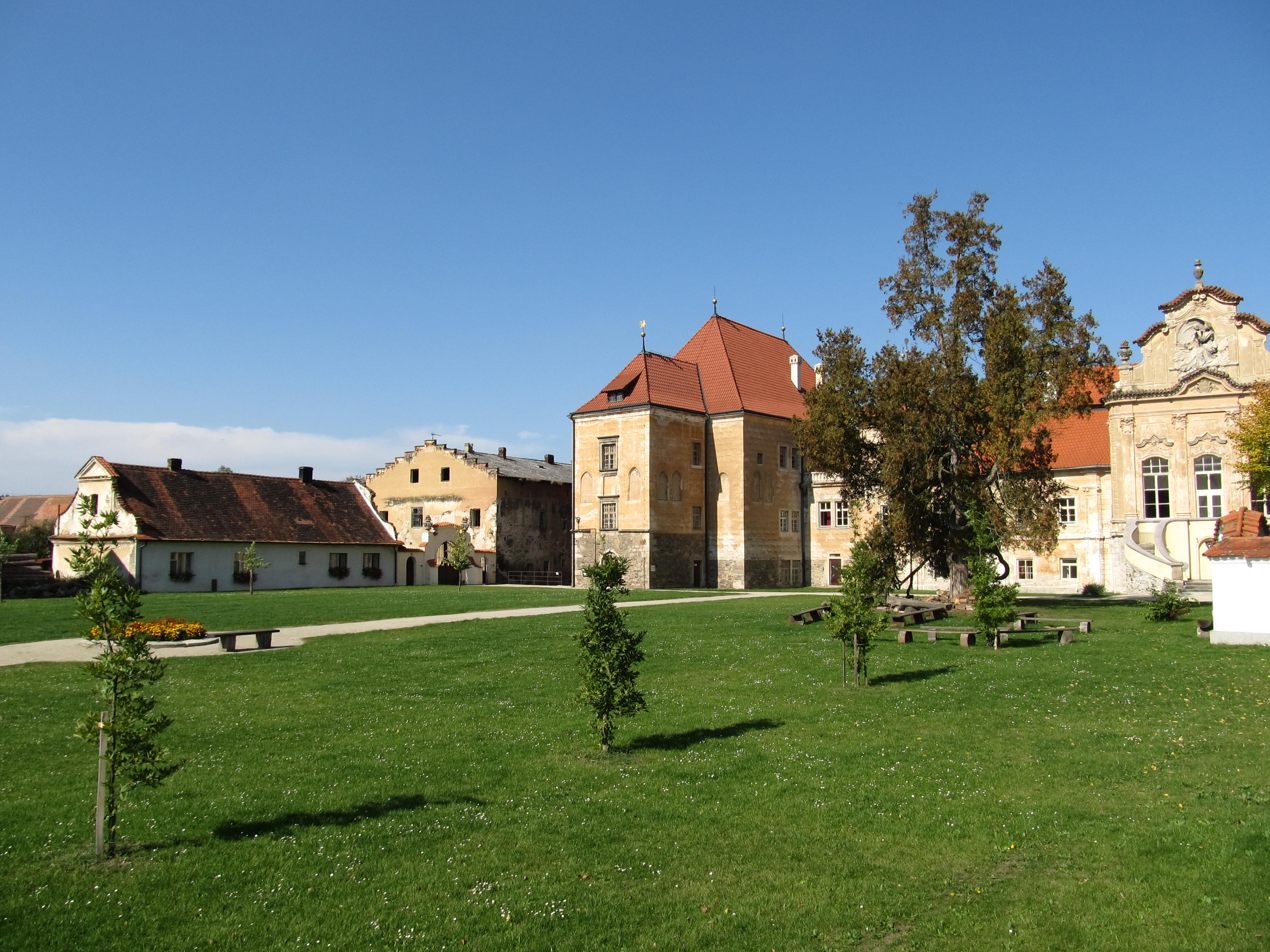
Monastery garden and Trčka's Castle

Želiv is known for architecturally valuable Premonstratensian monastery with the Church of the Nativity of the Virgin Mary. The monastery was founded in 1139 and renewed in 1712 according to design by Jan Santini Aichel.

Trčka's Castle is a late Gothic castle from the second half of the 15th century, located in the monastery complex. Its current appearance is a result of a Renaissance reconstruction. Today it is owned by the monastery.

== Twin towns – sister cities ==
Želiv is twinned with:

- Kiesen, Switzerland
