= Bratřice =

- Municipality
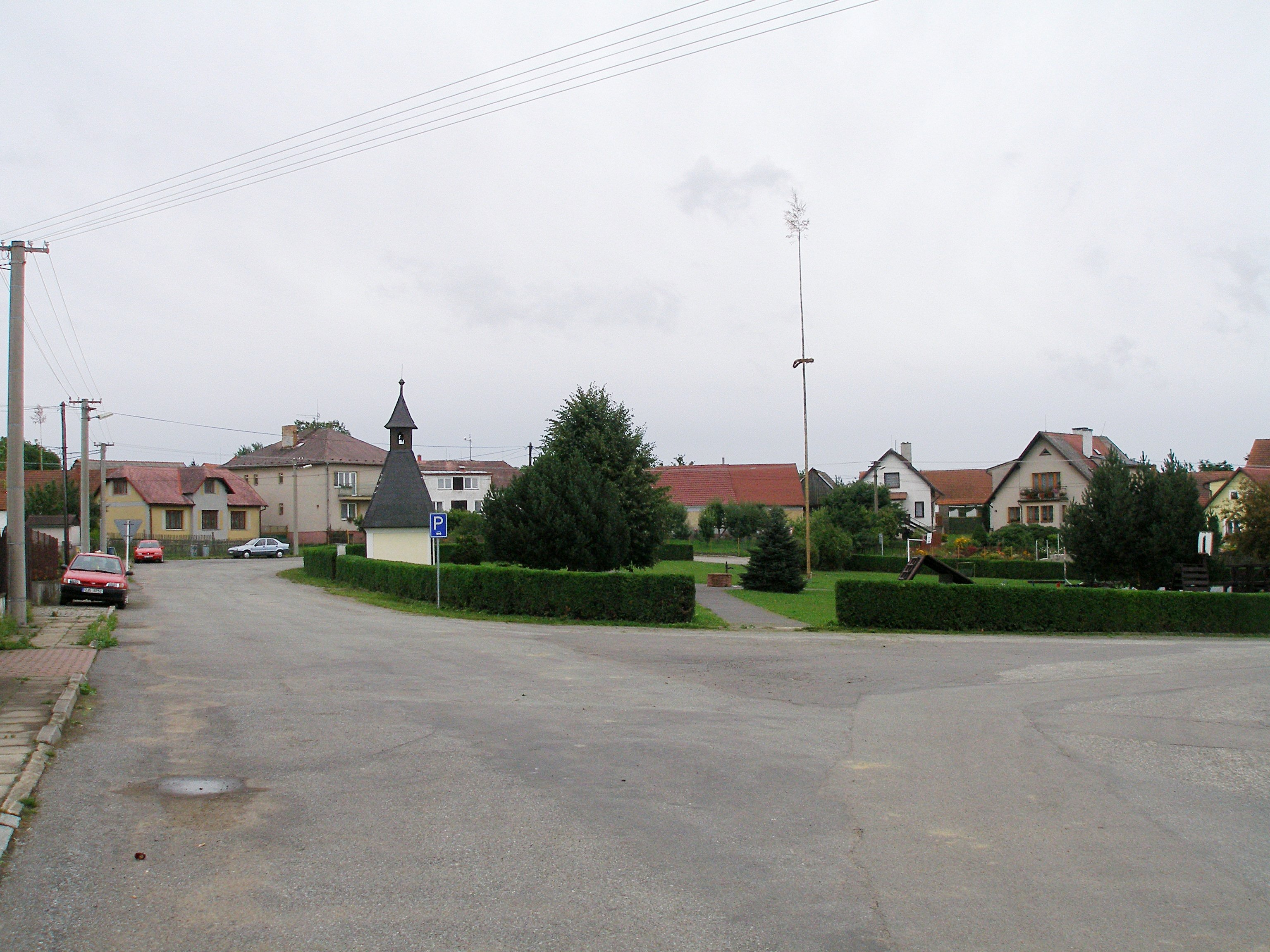
- Centre of Bratřice

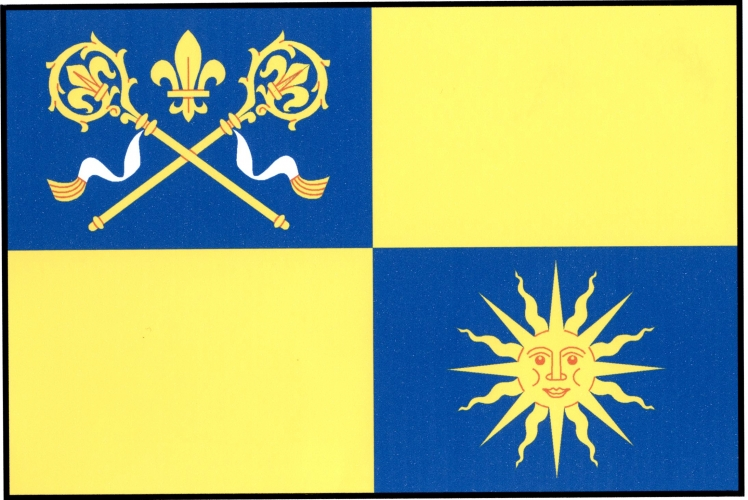
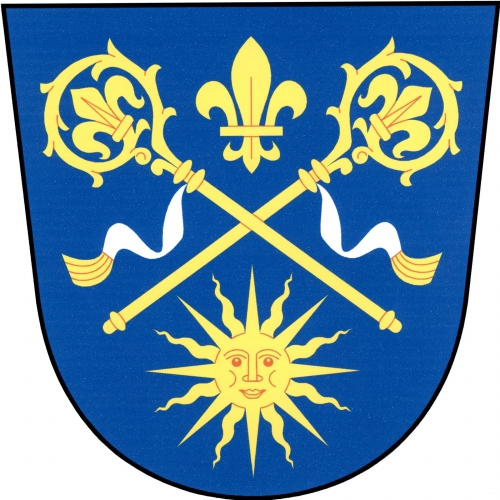
- Flag Coat of arms

- Location in the Czech Republic
- Coordinates: 49°30′59″N 15°0′5″E
- Country: Czech Republic
- Region: Vysočina
- District: Pelhřimov
- First mentioned: 1273

Area
  - Total: 10.35 km^{2} (4.00 sq mi)
- Elevation: 568 m (1,864 ft)

Population (2026-01-01)
  - Total: 156
  - Density: 15.1/km^{2} (39.0/sq mi)
- Time zone: UTC+1 (CET)
  - Summer (DST): UTC+2 (CEST)
- Postal code: 395 01
- Website: www.bratrice.cz

Bratřice is a municipality and village in Pelhřimov District in the Vysočina Region of the Czech Republic. It has about 200 inhabitants.

Bratřice lies approximately 19 kilometres (12 mi) north-west of Pelhřimov, 45 km (28 mi) west of Jihlava, and 76 km (47 mi) south-east of Prague.

== Administrative division ==
Bratřice consists of two municipal parts (in brackets population according to the 2021 census):

- Bratřice (130)
- Cetule (8)

== Demographics ==
Historical population
Year	Pop.	±%
1869	639	—
1880	542	−15.2%
1890	456	−15.9%
1900	428	−6.1%
1910	416	−2.8%
1921	362	−13.0%
1930	368	+1.7%
1950	254	−31.0%
1961	267	+5.1%
1970	243	−9.0%
1980	220	−9.5%
1991	196	−10.9%
2001	182	−7.1%
2011	148	−18.7%
2021	138	−6.8%
Source: Censuses
