= Velká Chyška =

- Municipality
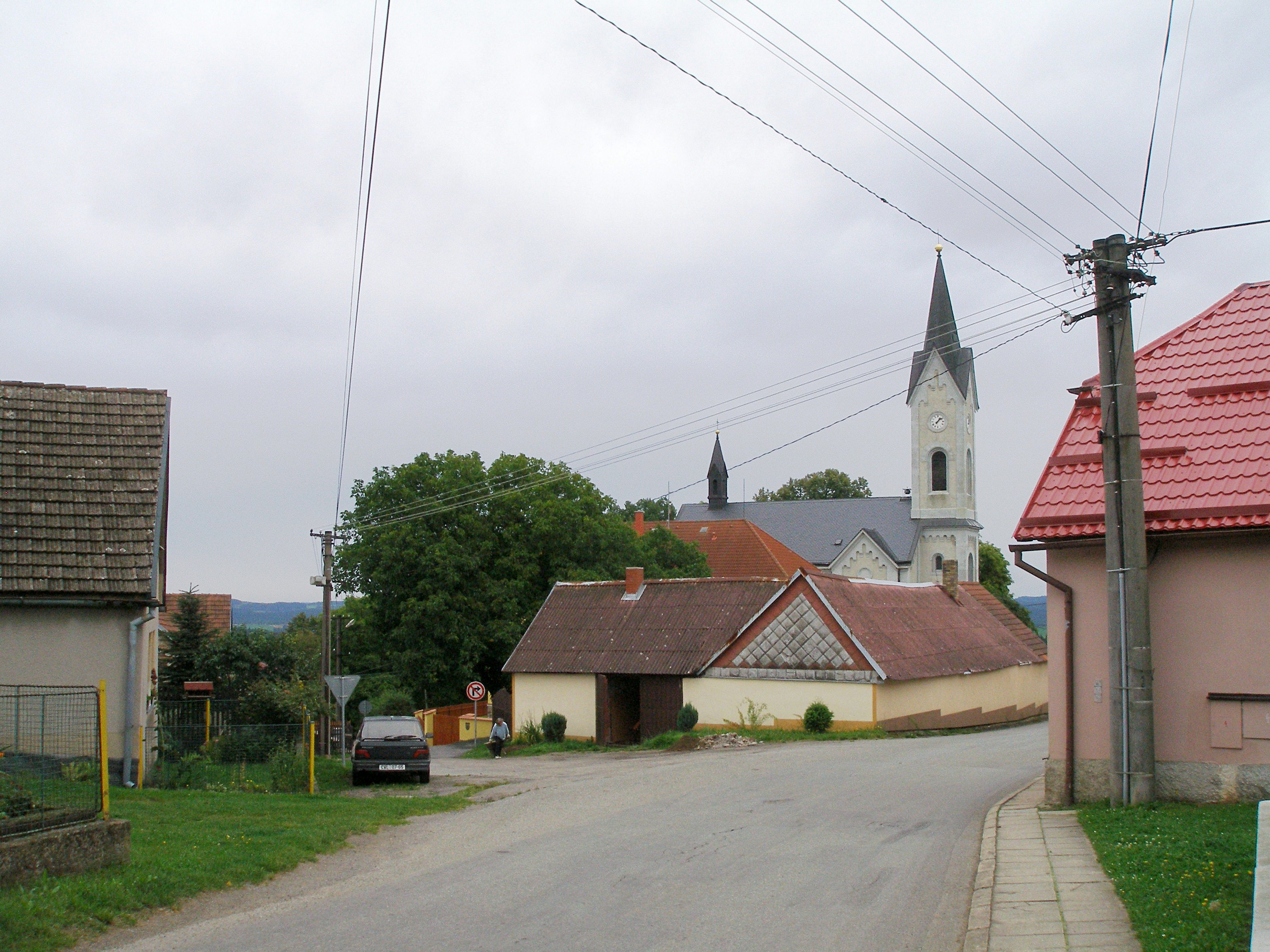
- Centre with Church of Saint John the Baptist

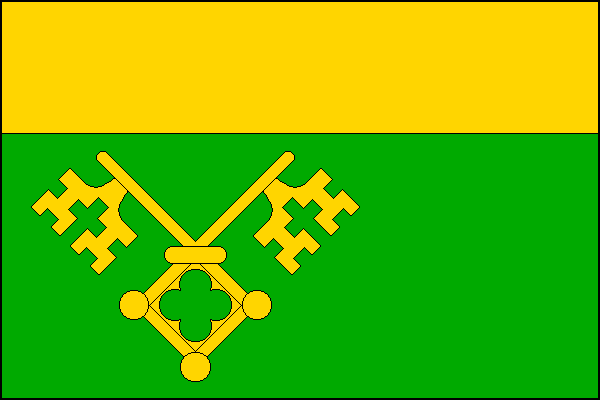
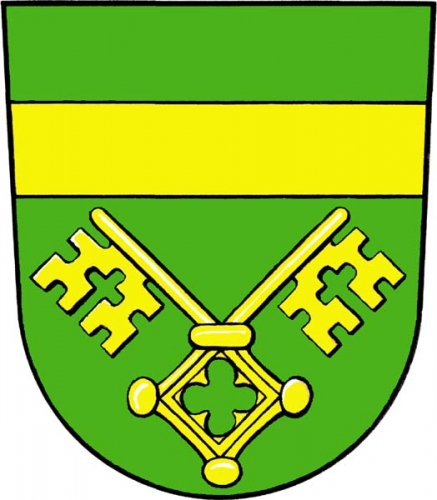
- Flag Coat of arms

- Location in the Czech Republic
- Coordinates: 49°30′43″N 15°2′14″E
- Country: Czech Republic
- Region: Vysočina
- District: Pelhřimov
- First mentioned: 1243

Area
  - Total: 8.15 km^{2} (3.15 sq mi)
- Elevation: 572 m (1,877 ft)

Population (2026-01-01)
  - Total: 268
  - Density: 32.9/km^{2} (85.2/sq mi)
- Time zone: UTC+1 (CET)
  - Summer (DST): UTC+2 (CEST)
- Postal code: 394 28
- Website: www.velkachyska.cz

Velká Chyška is a municipality and village in Pelhřimov District in the Vysočina Region of the Czech Republic. It has about 300 inhabitants.

Velká Chyška lies approximately 16 kilometres (10 mi) north-west of Pelhřimov, 43 km (27 mi) west of Jihlava, and 78 km (48 mi) south-east of Prague.

== Demographics ==
Historical population
Year	Pop.	±%
1869	616	—
1880	616	+0.0%
1890	534	−13.3%
1900	534	+0.0%
1910	527	−1.3%
1921	557	+5.7%
1930	495	−11.1%
1950	402	−18.8%
1961	403	+0.2%
1970	396	−1.7%
1980	407	+2.8%
1991	334	−17.9%
2001	301	−9.9%
2011	302	+0.3%
2021	259	−14.2%
Source: Censuses
