= Arnošt Frischer =

Jewish Czech politician (1887–1954)

Arnošt Frischer (German: Ernst Frischer; 7 July 1887, Heřmanův Městec – 2 August 1954, London) was a Jewish Czech politician who represented the Jewish community to the Czechoslovak government-in-exile. Much more so than other Jews, Frischer sympathized with the Czech National Social Party's aims of ethnic homogenization in postwar Czechoslovakia.

After the war, he returned to Czechoslovakia and was elected chairman of the Council of the Jewish Communities in Bohemia and Moravia-Silesia. Frischer was ousted from his position after the 1948 Communist coup; he soon emigrated to the United Kingdom where he died in 1954.
