= Cetoraz =

- Municipality
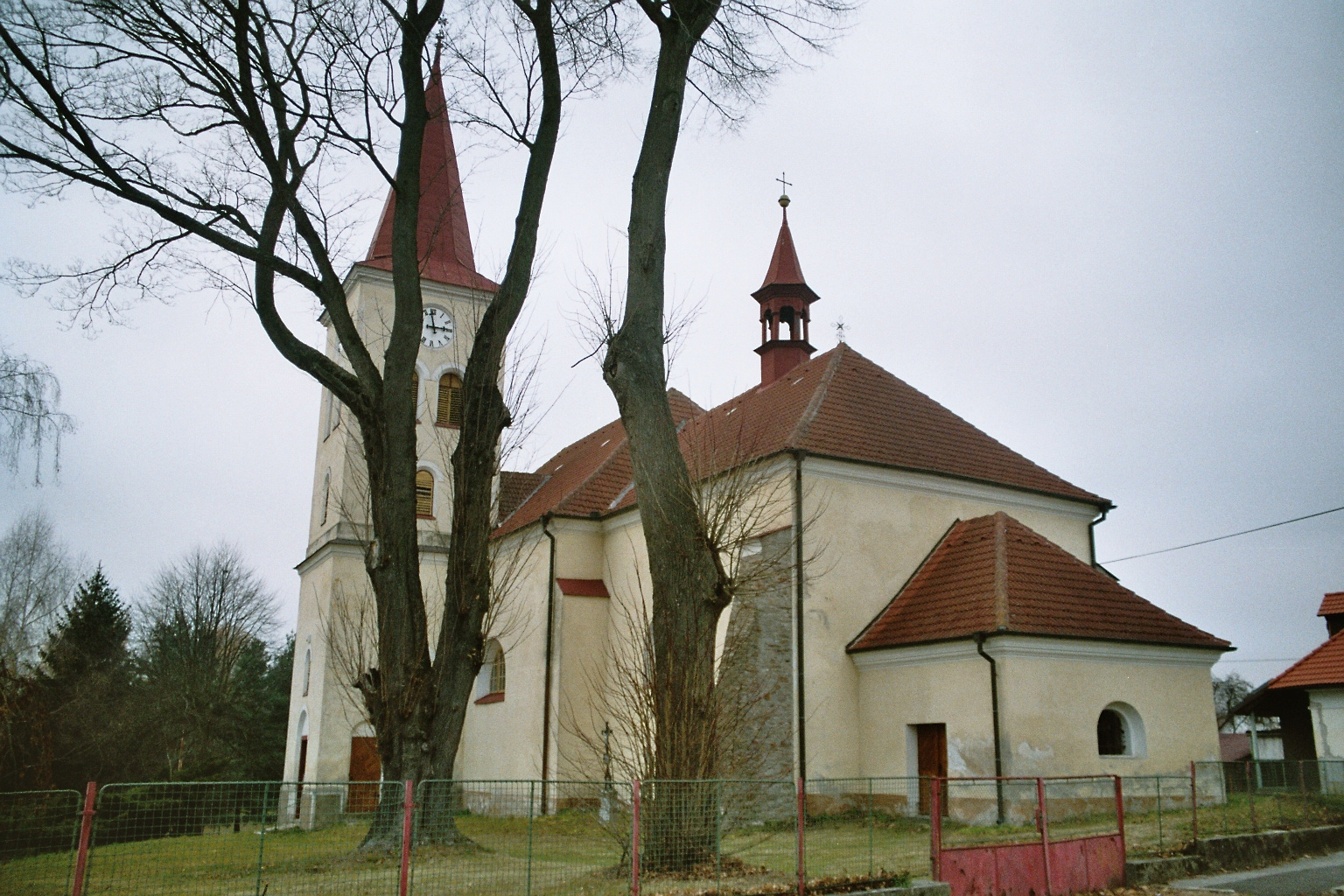
- Church of Saint Wenceslaus

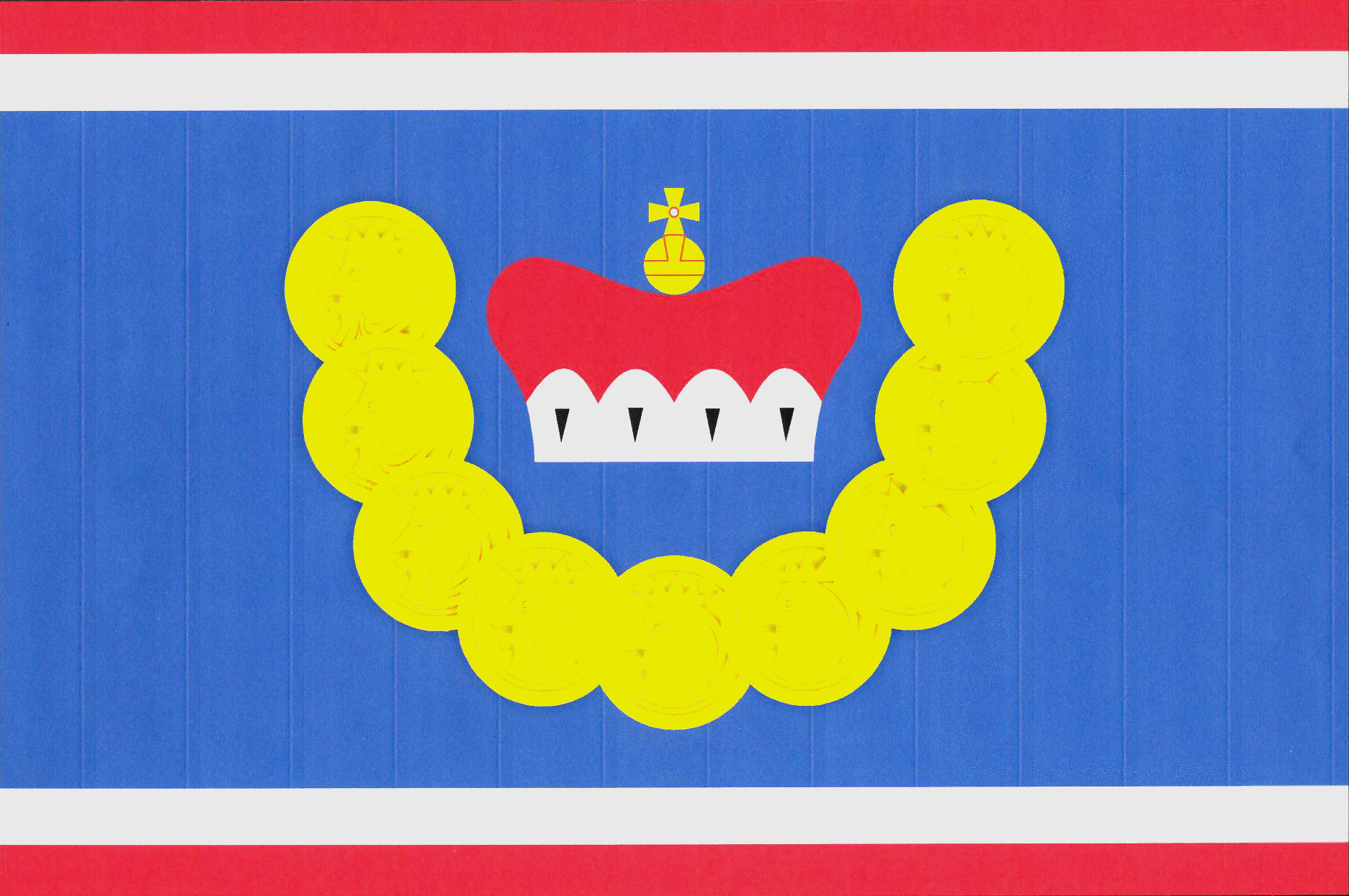
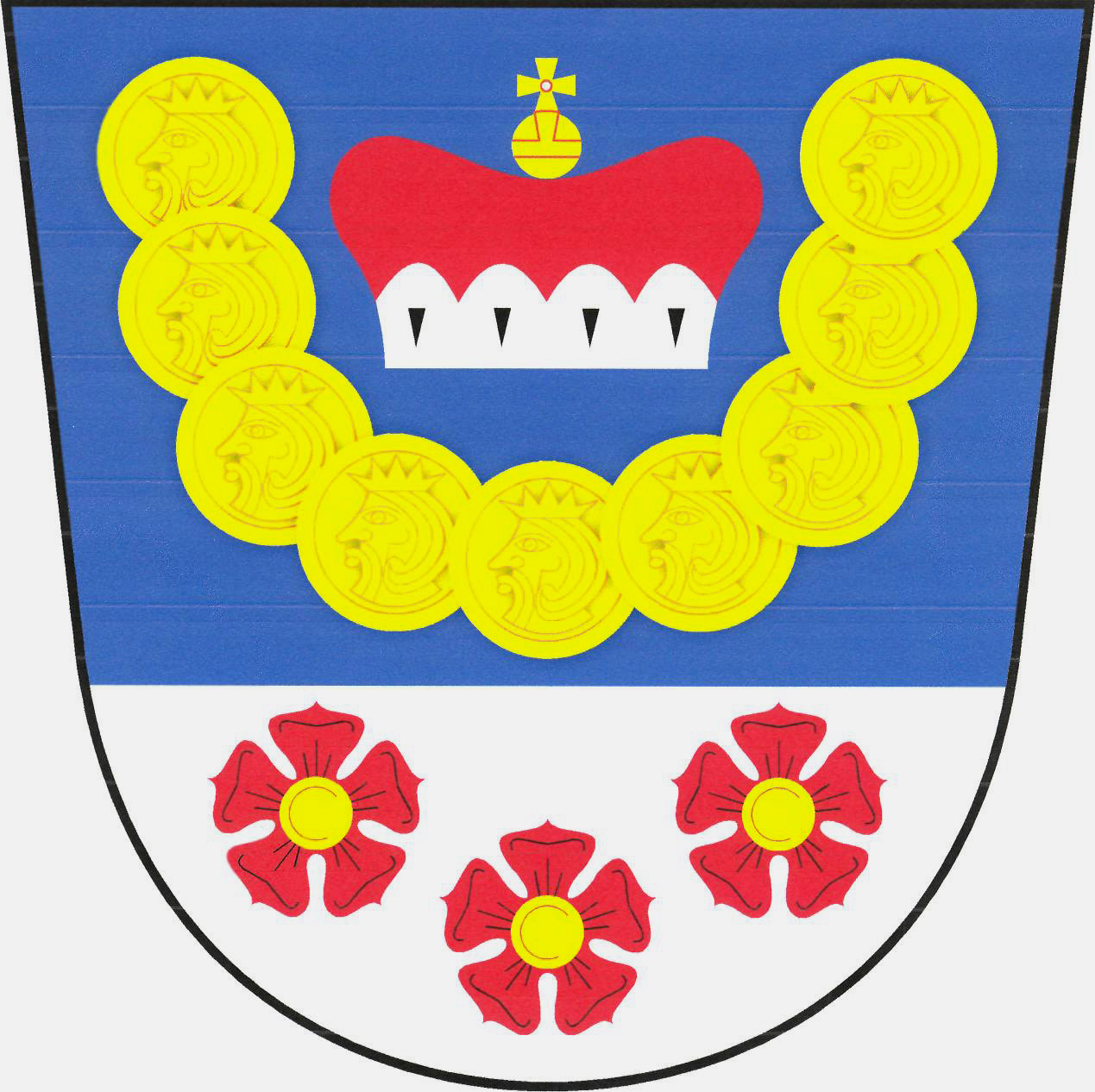
- Flag Coat of arms

- Location in the Czech Republic
- Coordinates: 49°27′19″N 14°57′26″E
- Country: Czech Republic
- Region: Vysočina
- District: Pelhřimov
- First mentioned: 1307

Area
  - Total: 12.04 km^{2} (4.65 sq mi)
- Elevation: 588 m (1,929 ft)

Population (2026-01-01)
  - Total: 314
  - Density: 26.1/km^{2} (67.5/sq mi)
- Time zone: UTC+1 (CET)
  - Summer (DST): UTC+2 (CEST)
- Postal code: 394 11
- Website: www.obeccetoraz.cz

Cetoraz is a municipality and village in Pelhřimov District in the Vysočina Region of the Czech Republic. It has about 300 inhabitants.

Cetoraz lies approximately 20 kilometres (12 mi) west of Pelhřimov, 47 km (29 mi) west of Jihlava, and 80 km (50 mi) south-east of Prague.

== Demographics ==
Historical population
| Year | Pop. | ±% |
|---|---|---|
| 1869 | 547 | — |
| 1880 | 557 | +1.8% |
| 1890 | 541 | −2.9% |
| 1900 | 520 | −3.9% |
| 1910 | 563 | +8.3% |
| 1921 | 600 | +6.6% |
| 1930 | 578 | −3.7% |
| 1950 | 443 | −23.4% |
| 1961 | 444 | +0.2% |
| 1970 | 408 | −8.1% |
| 1980 | 335 | −17.9% |
| 1991 | 289 | −13.7% |
| 2001 | 278 | −3.8% |
| 2011 | 307 | +10.4% |
| 2021 | 302 | −1.6% |
Source: Censuses
