= Zhořec =

- Municipality
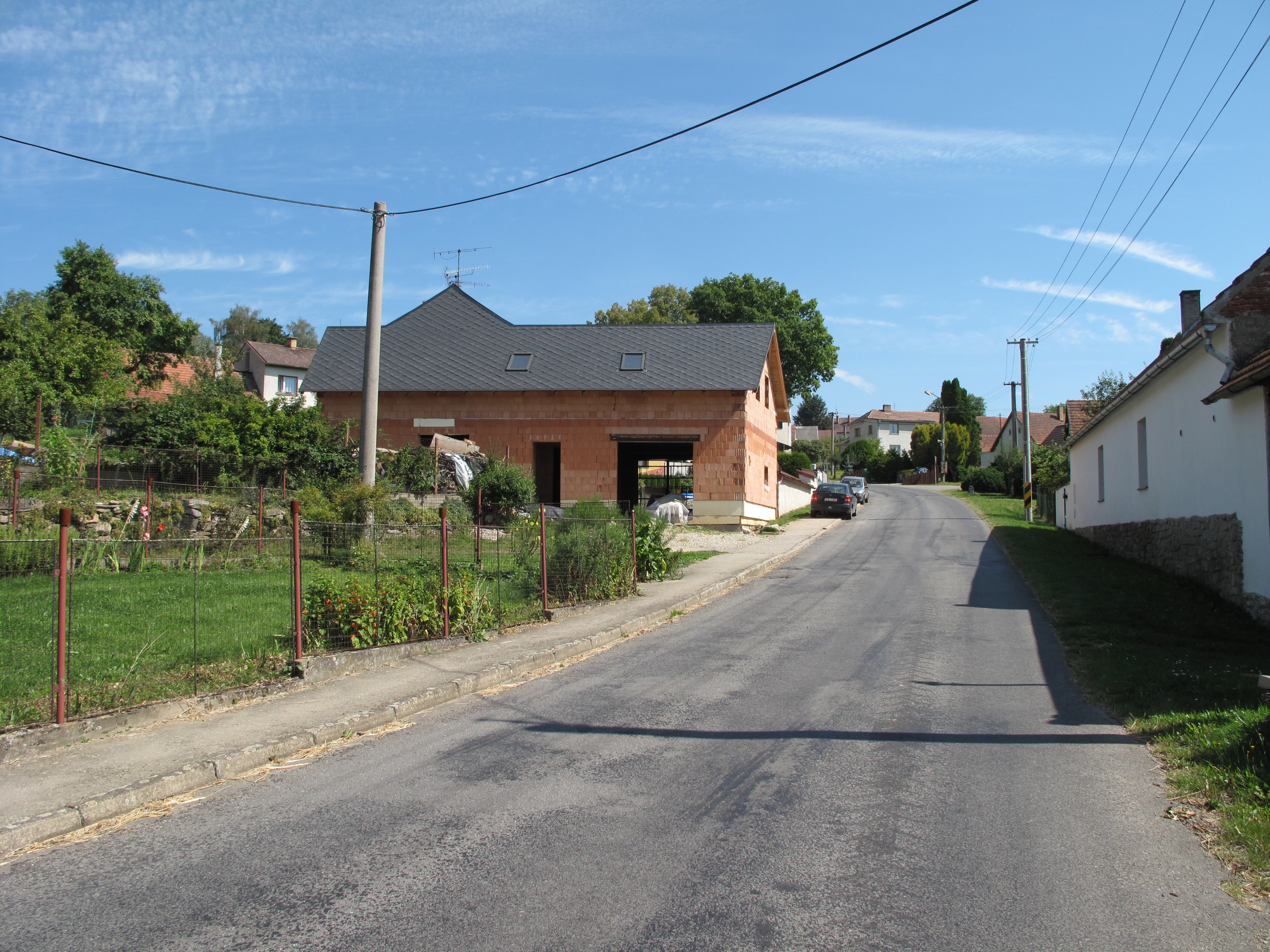
- Main street

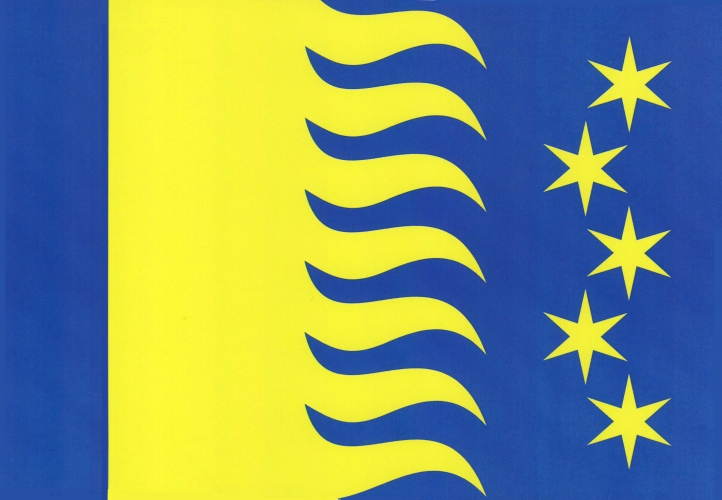
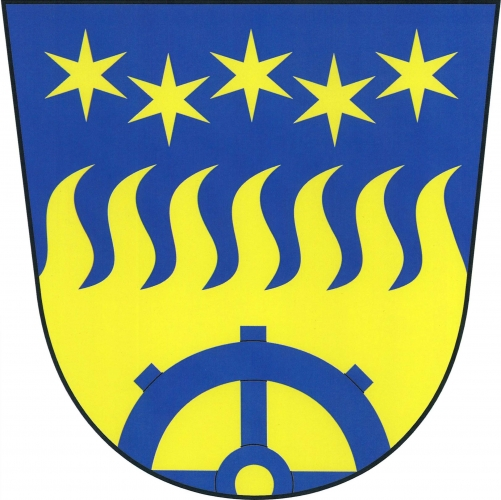
- Flag Coat of arms

- Location in the Czech Republic
- Coordinates: 49°29′23″N 14°57′45″E
- Country: Czech Republic
- Region: Vysočina
- District: Pelhřimov
- First mentioned: 1316

Area
  - Total: 5.83 km^{2} (2.25 sq mi)
- Elevation: 594 m (1,949 ft)

Population (2026-01-01)
  - Total: 110
  - Density: 19/km^{2} (49/sq mi)
- Time zone: UTC+1 (CET)
  - Summer (DST): UTC+2 (CEST)
- Postal code: 395 01
- Website: www.zhorec.cz

Zhořec is a municipality and village in Pelhřimov District in the Vysočina Region of the Czech Republic. It has about 100 inhabitants.

Zhořec lies approximately 19 kilometres (12 mi) west of Pelhřimov, 46 km (29 mi) west of Jihlava, and 78 km (48 mi) south-east of Prague.

== Demographics ==
Historical population
Year	Pop.	±%
1869	252	—
1880	270	+7.1%
1890	243	−10.0%
1900	254	+4.5%
1910	248	−2.4%
1921	274	+10.5%
1930	239	−12.8%
1950	202	−15.5%
1961	215	+6.4%
1970	218	+1.4%
1980	194	−11.0%
1991	176	−9.3%
2001	134	−23.9%
2011	120	−10.4%
2021	103	−14.2%
Source: Censuses
