= Samšín =

- Municipality
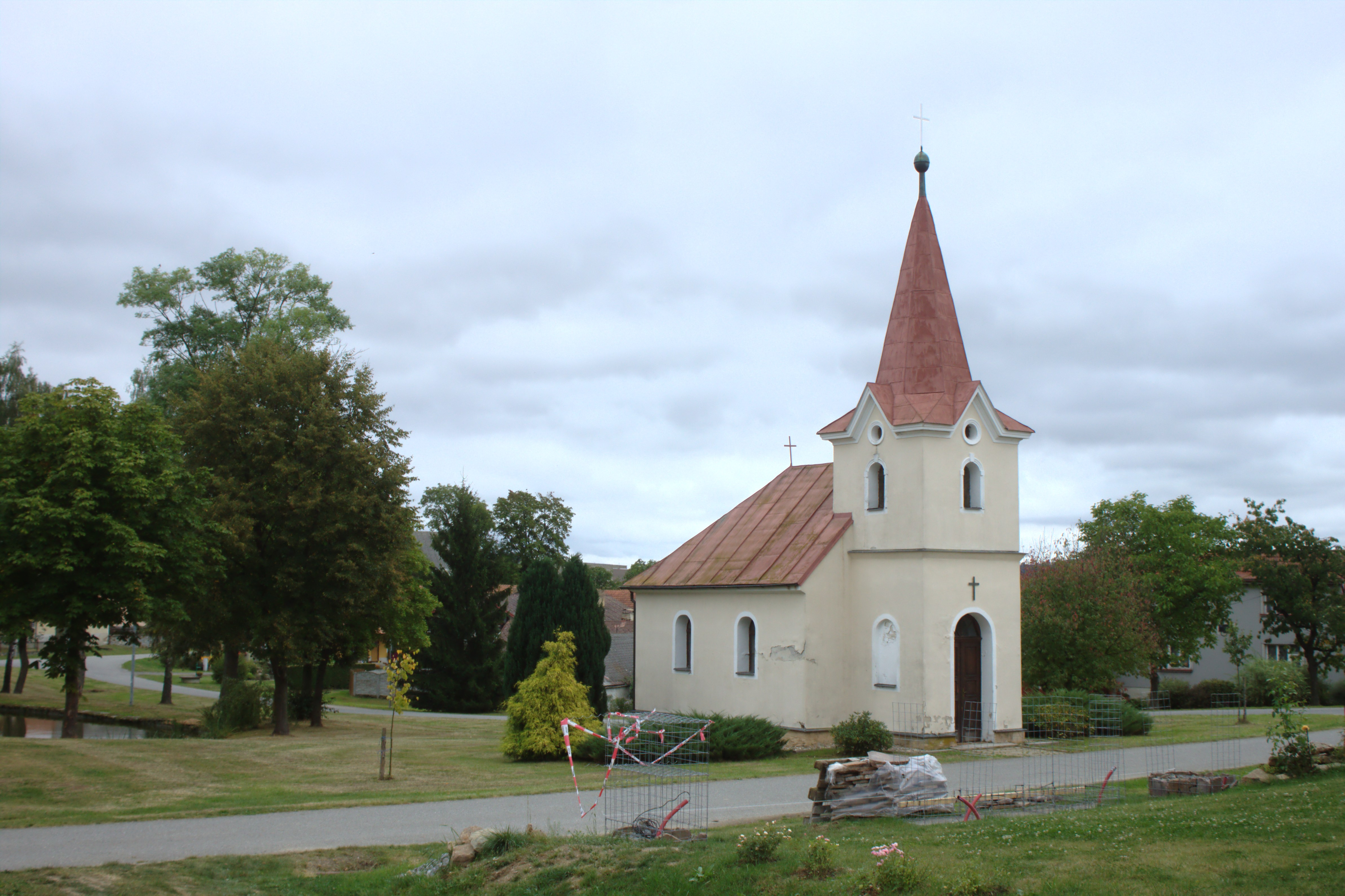
- Chapel of Saint John of Nepomuk

- Location in the Czech Republic
- Coordinates: 49°29′8″N 15°3′42″E
- Country: Czech Republic
- Region: Vysočina
- District: Pelhřimov
- First mentioned: 1379

Area
  - Total: 7.15 km^{2} (2.76 sq mi)
- Elevation: 512 m (1,680 ft)

Population (2026-01-01)
  - Total: 153
  - Density: 21.4/km^{2} (55.4/sq mi)
- Time zone: UTC+1 (CET)
  - Summer (DST): UTC+2 (CEST)
- Postal code: 395 01
- Website: www.samsin.cz

Samšín is a municipality and village in Pelhřimov District in the Vysočina Region of the Czech Republic. It has about 200 inhabitants.

Samšín lies approximately 13 kilometres (8 mi) north-west of Pelhřimov, 40 km (25 mi) west of Jihlava, and 82 km (51 mi) south-east of Prague.

== Administrative division ==
Samšín consists of two municipal parts (in brackets population according to the 2021 census):

- Samšín (88)
- Přáslavice (59)

== Demographics ==
Historical population
Year	Pop.	±%
1869	427	—
1880	426	−0.2%
1890	442	+3.8%
1900	424	−4.1%
1910	424	+0.0%
1921	409	−3.5%
1930	341	−16.6%
1950	263	−22.9%
1961	242	−8.0%
1970	227	−6.2%
1980	196	−13.7%
1991	192	−2.0%
2001	177	−7.8%
2011	156	−11.9%
2021	147	−5.8%
Source: Censuses
