= Červené Pečky =

- Market town
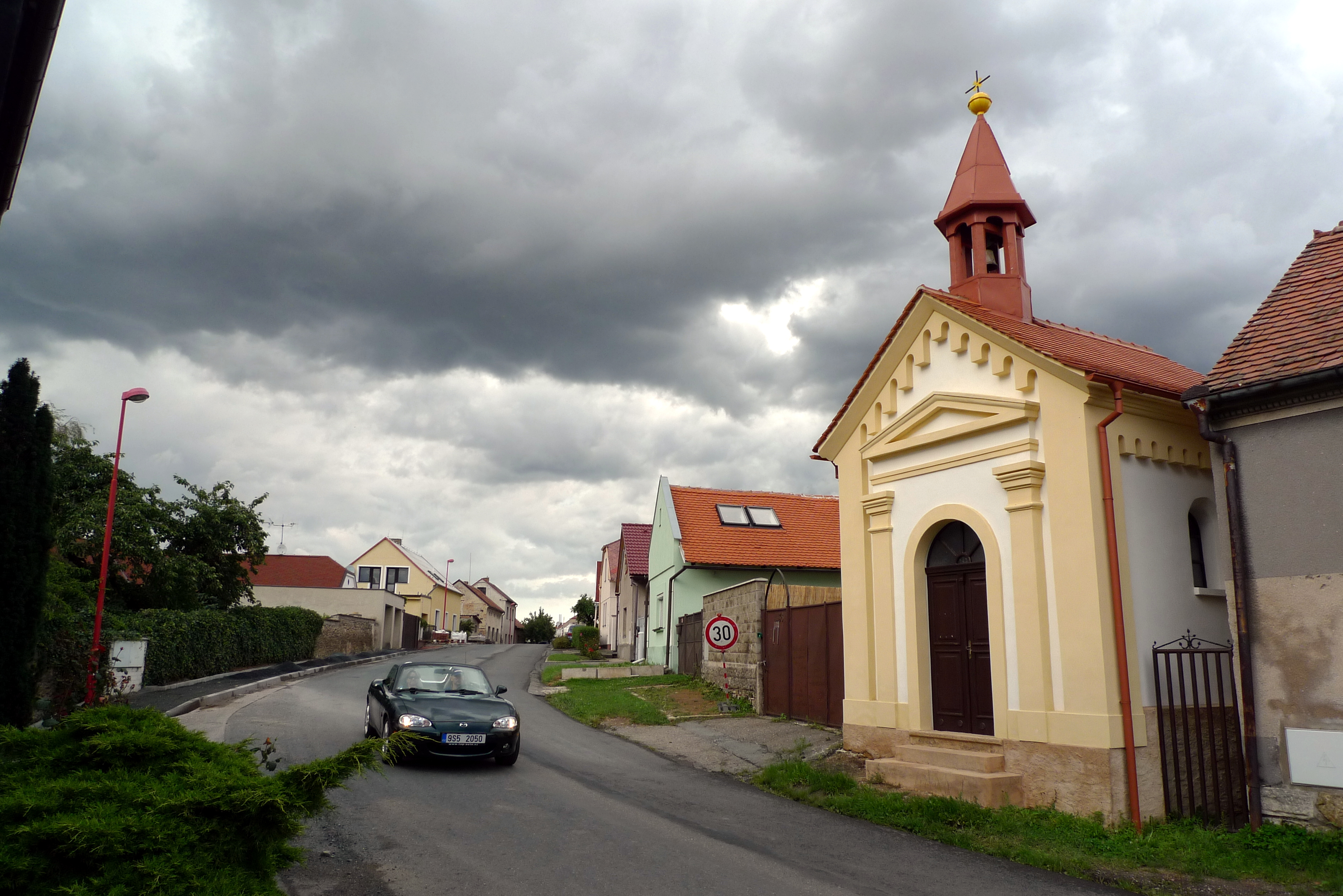
- Bojiště, a part of Červené Pečky

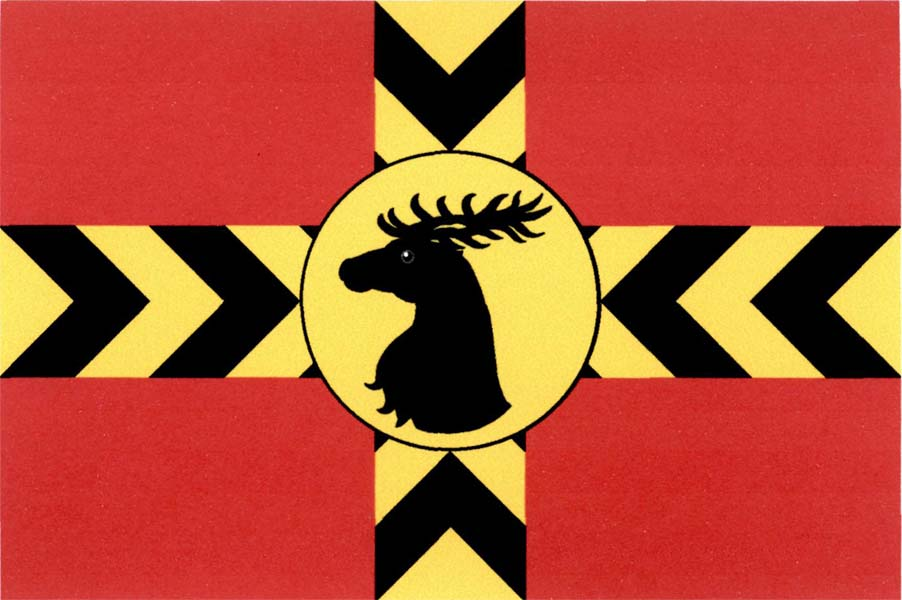
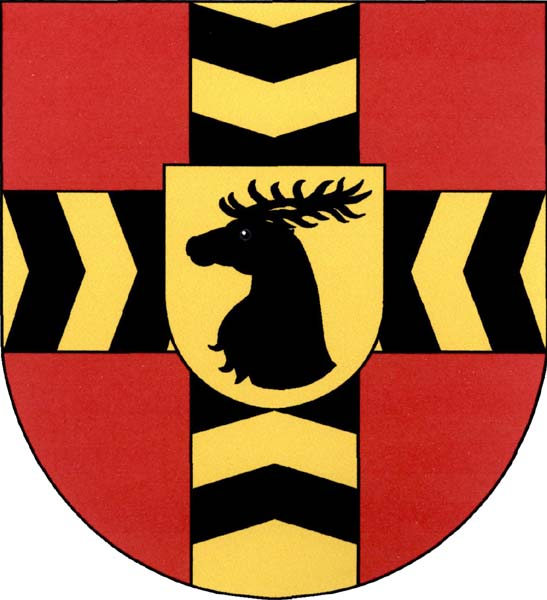
- Flag Coat of arms

- Location in the Czech Republic
- Coordinates: 49°58′42″N 15°12′31″E
- Country: Czech Republic
- Region: Central Bohemian
- District: Kolín
- First mentioned: 1333

Area
  - Total: 16.17 km^{2} (6.24 sq mi)
- Elevation: 285 m (935 ft)

Population (2026-01-01)
  - Total: 2,098
  - Density: 129.7/km^{2} (336.0/sq mi)
- Time zone: UTC+1 (CET)
  - Summer (DST): UTC+2 (CEST)
- Postal codes: 280 02, 281 21
- Website: www.cervenepecky.cz

Červené Pečky (Czech pronunciation: [ˈtʃɛrvɛnɛː ˈpɛtʃkɪ]) is a market town in Kolín District in the Central Bohemian Region of the Czech Republic. It has about 2,000 inhabitants.

== Administrative division ==
Červené Pečky consists of six municipal parts (in brackets population according to the 2021 census):

- Červené Pečky (1,413)
- Bohouňovice I (153)
- Bojiště (93)
- Bořetice (80)
- Dolany (92)
- Opatovice (93)

== Etymology ==
The name Pečky is derived from the word pečka, which once meant 'dried apple/pear' in Czech. The name may have originated from a nickname for the inhabitants or from the surname Pečka. The prefix Červené (i.e. 'red') has been used since 1868. It probably reflects an event where the local brewery was painted with ox blood.

== Geography ==
Červené Pečky is located about 5 kilometres (3 mi) south of Kolín and 48 km (30 mi) east of Prague. It lies in on the border between the Upper Sázava Hills and Central Elbe Table. The highest point is the hill Opatovický vrch at 421 m (1,381 ft) above sea level.

== History ==
The first written mention of Pečky is from 1333. The village was promoted to a market town in 1755 by Empress Maria Theresa. From 1794, Pečky was owned by the Barons of Hrubý and prospered. In 1868, the market town changed its name to Červené Pečky.

== Demographics ==
Historical population

Year	Pop.	±%
1869	2,273	—
1880	2,337	+2.8%
1890	2,354	+0.7%
1900	2,428	+3.1%
1910	2,363	−2.7%

Year	Pop.	±%
1921	2,424	+2.6%
1930	2,414	−0.4%
1950	2,110	−12.6%
1961	2,151	+1.9%
1970	1,914	−11.0%

Year	Pop.	±%
1980	1,731	−9.6%
1991	1,587	−8.3%
2001	1,614	+1.7%
2011	1,687	+4.5%
2021	1,924	+14.0%

Source: Censuses

== Transport ==
Červené Pečky is located on the railway line of local importance from Kolín to Ledečko.

== Sights ==
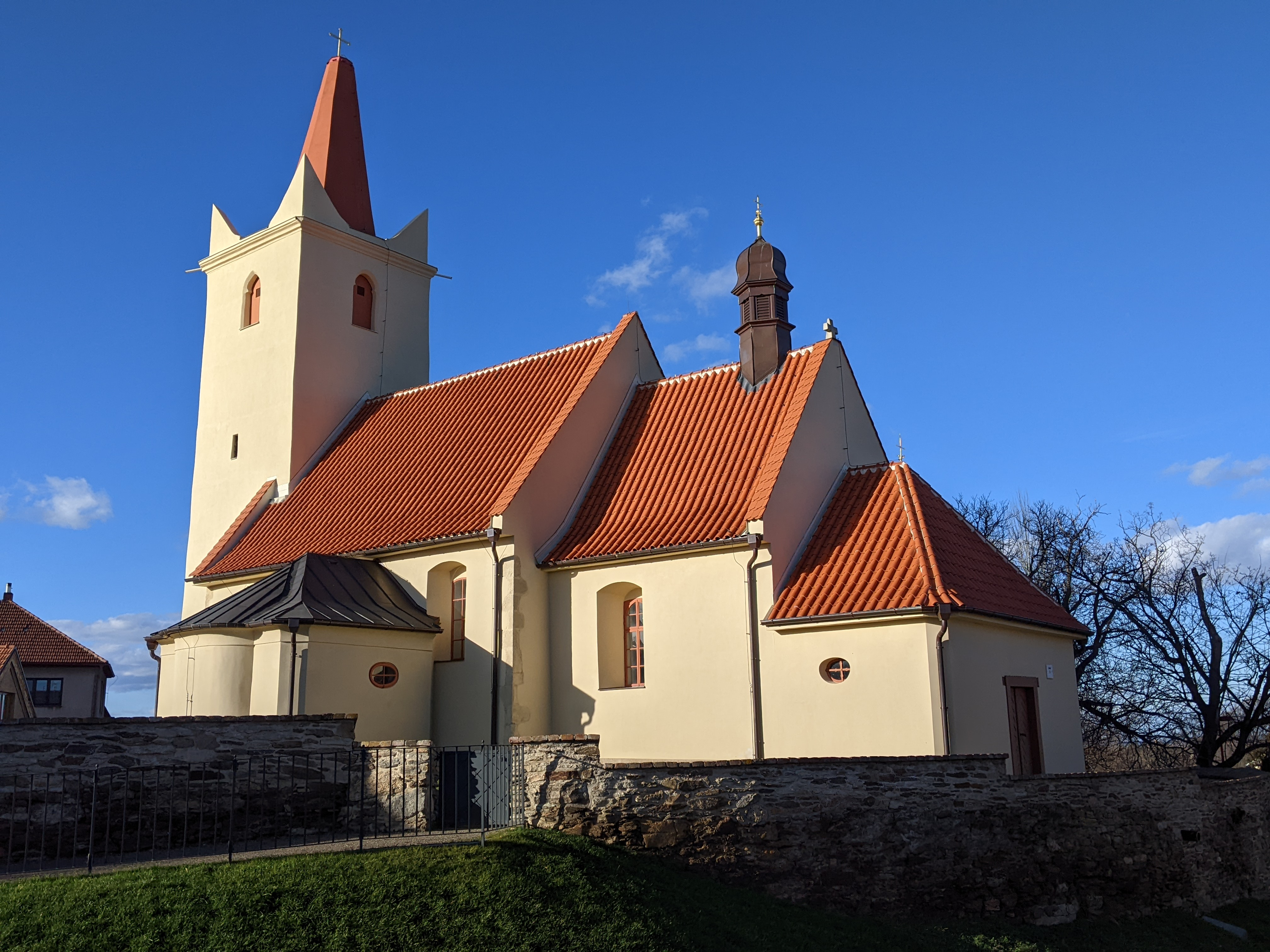
Church of the Nativity of the Virgin Mary

One of the two landmarks of Červené Pečky is the Church of the Nativity of the Virgin Mary. it is originally a Gothic church with a Renaissance tower, later rebuilt in the Baroque and Neoclassical styles.

The Červené Pečky Castle is a Baroque castle from the 17th century, founded by the Trauttmansdorff family. It is surrounded by a park.
