= Křelovice (Pelhřimov District) =

- Municipality
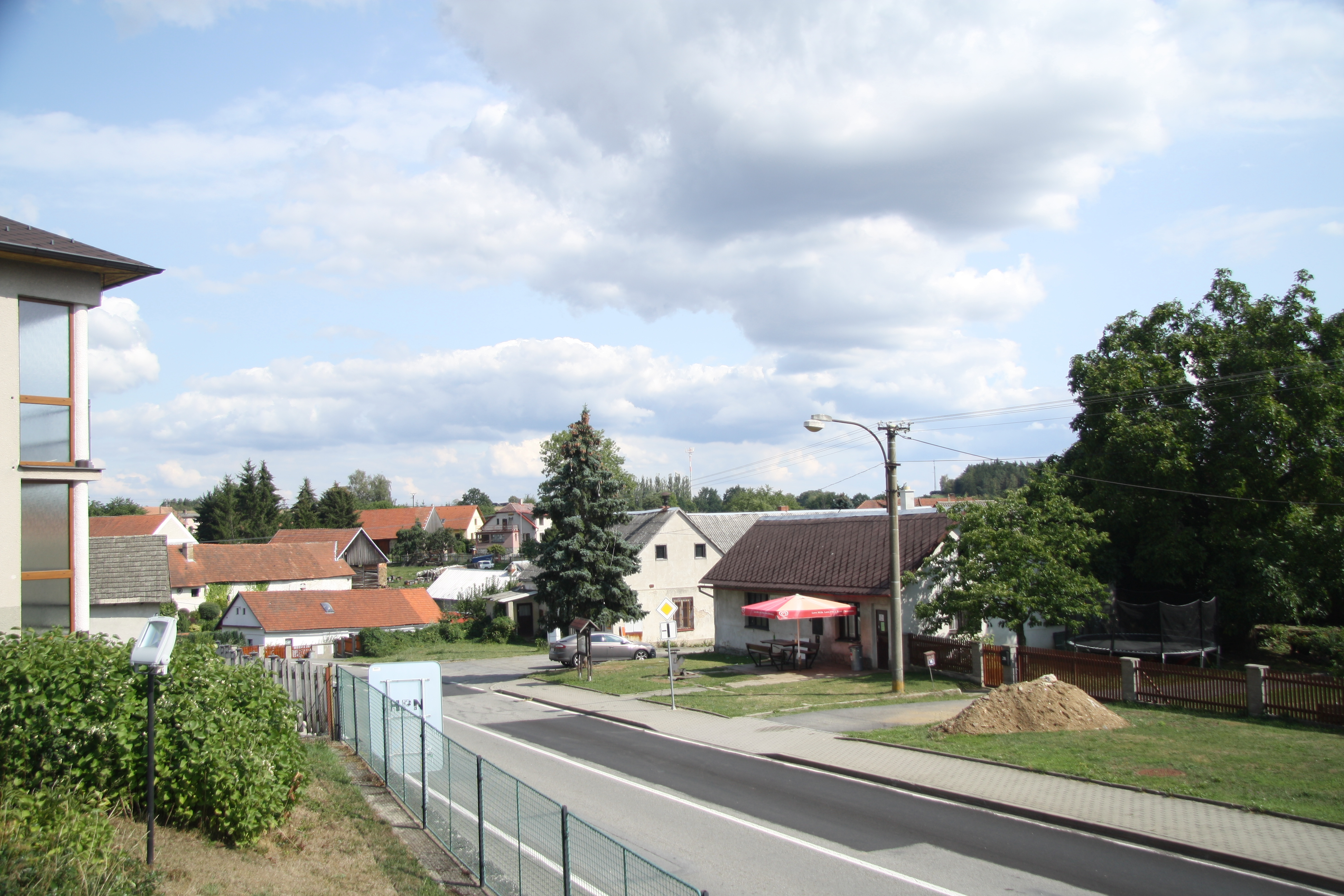
- Centre of Křelovice

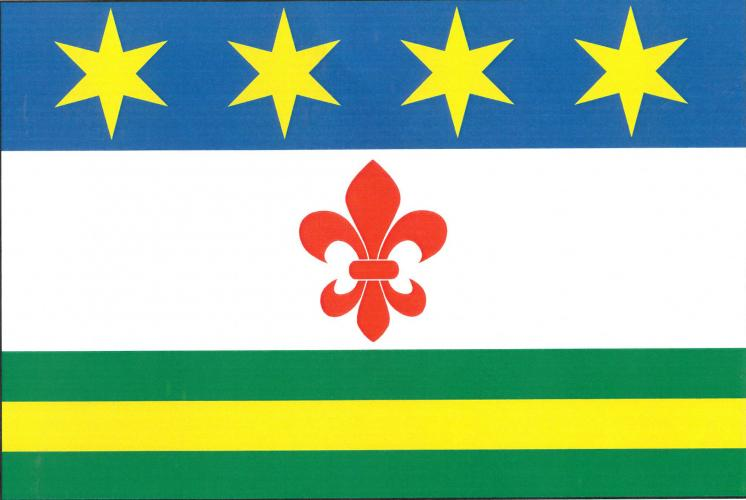
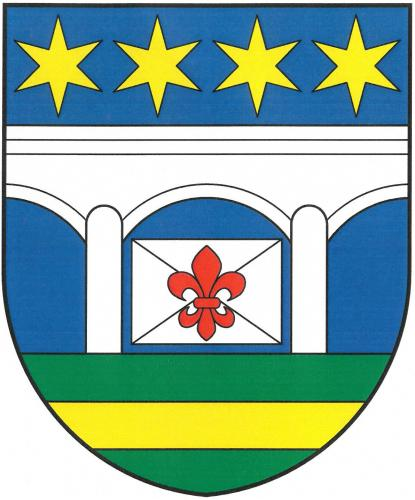
- Flag Coat of arms

- Location in the Czech Republic
- Coordinates: 49°32′13″N 15°10′7″E
- Country: Czech Republic
- Region: Vysočina
- District: Pelhřimov
- First mentioned: 1379

Area
  - Total: 15.36 km^{2} (5.93 sq mi)
- Elevation: 489 m (1,604 ft)

Population (2026-01-01)
  - Total: 328
  - Density: 21.4/km^{2} (55.3/sq mi)
- Time zone: UTC+1 (CET)
  - Summer (DST): UTC+2 (CEST)
- Postal codes: 394 45, 396 01
- Website: www.krelovice.cz

Křelovice is a municipality and village in Pelhřimov District in the Vysočina Region of the Czech Republic. It has about 300 inhabitants.

Křelovice lies approximately 13 kilometres (8 mi) north of Pelhřimov, 35 km (22 mi) north-west of Jihlava, and 82 km (51 mi) south-east of Prague.

== Administrative division ==
Křelovice consists of four municipal parts (in brackets population according to the 2021 census):

- Křelovice (282)
- Číhovice (36)
- Jiřičky (10)
- Poříčí (11)

== Demographics ==
Historical population
Year	Pop.	±%
1869	892	—
1880	995	+11.5%
1890	952	−4.3%
1900	898	−5.7%
1910	953	+6.1%
1921	948	−0.5%
1930	900	−5.1%
1950	635	−29.4%
1961	625	−1.6%
1970	576	−7.8%
1980	479	−16.8%
1991	387	−19.2%
2001	350	−9.6%
2011	350	+0.0%
2021	339	−3.1%
Source: Censuses
