= Červená Řečice =

- Town
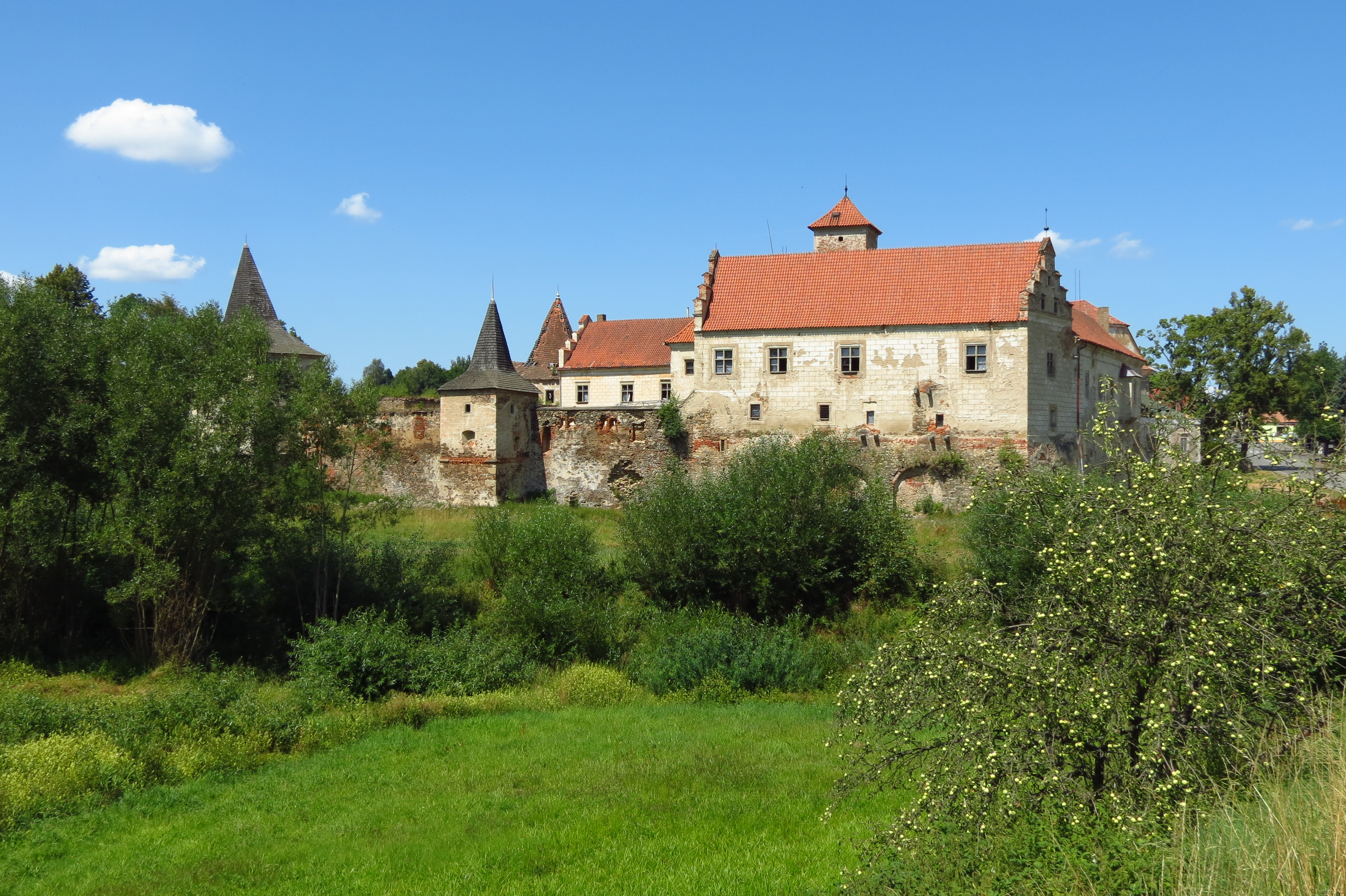
- Červená Řečice Castle

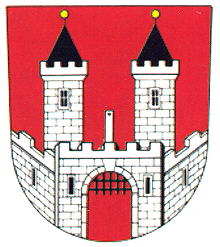
- Coat of arms

- Location in the Czech Republic
- Coordinates: 49°30′29″N 15°10′11″E
- Country: Czech Republic
- Region: Vysočina
- District: Pelhřimov
- First mentioned: 1279

Government
  - Mayor: Zdeňka Bečková

Area
  - Total: 26.46 km^{2} (10.22 sq mi)
- Elevation: 455 m (1,493 ft)

Population (2026-01-01)
  - Total: 1,026
  - Density: 38.78/km^{2} (100.4/sq mi)
- Time zone: UTC+1 (CET)
  - Summer (DST): UTC+2 (CEST)
- Postal codes: 393 01, 394 46
- Website: www.cervenarecice.info

Červená Řečice (Czech pronunciation: [ˈtʃɛrvɛnaː ˈr̝ɛtʃɪtsɛ]) is a town in Pelhřimov District in the Vysočina Region of the Czech Republic. It has about 1,000 inhabitants. The town is located on the Trnava River in the Křemešník Highlands.

Červená Řečice was founded in the 13th century at the latest. The historic town centre is well preserved and is protected as an urban monument zone. The main landmark of the town is the Červená Řečice Castle.

== Administrative division ==
Červená Řečice consists of five municipal parts (in brackets population according to the 2021 census):

- Červená Řečice (820)
- Milotičky (17)
- Popelištná (83)
- Těchoraz (63)
- Zmišovice (32)

== Etymology ==
The name řečice is derived from řeka (i.e. 'river'), meaning 'small river'. In the 14th century, it was called Biskupská Řečice ("Bishop's Řečice"). Since 1559, it has been named Červená Řečice ('red Řečice').

== Geography ==
Červená Řečice is located about 9 kilometres (6 mi) north of Pelhřimov and 31 km (19 mi) northwest of Jihlava. It lies in the Křemešník Highlands. The highest point is the hill Houska at 626 m (2,054 ft) above sea level. The town is situated on the right bank of the Trnava River and on the shores of the Trnávka Reservoir.

== History ==
The first written mention of Řečice is from 1279. It was the centre of a large estate belonging to Prague's bishops and, later, archbishops. Its next owners were Ladislaus the Posthumous, the Trčka of Lípa family, and the Lords of Stráž. From 1612 until the abolishment of serfdom in 1850, it was owned by the Lords of Říčany.

== Demographics ==
Historical population

Year	Pop.	±%
1869	2,039	—
1880	2,061	+1.1%
1890	1,936	−6.1%
1900	1,873	−3.3%
1910	1,947	+4.0%

Year	Pop.	±%
1921	1,826	−6.2%
1930	1,510	−17.3%
1950	1,210	−19.9%
1961	1,320	+9.1%
1970	1,310	−0.8%

Year	Pop.	±%
1980	1,272	−2.9%
1991	1,073	−15.6%
2001	987	−8.0%
2011	941	−4.7%
2021	1,015	+7.9%

Source: Censuses

== Transport ==
There are no railways or major roads passing through the municipality.

== Sights ==
The Červená Řečice Castle was rebuilt in the Renaissance style in the 16th century. The castle complex is a valuable example of Czech Renaissance. The façade is decorated by sgraffiti. The original moat is partially preserved.

== Twin towns – sister cities ==
Červená Řečice is twinned with:

- Kirchdorf, Switzerland
