= Hořepník =

- Municipality
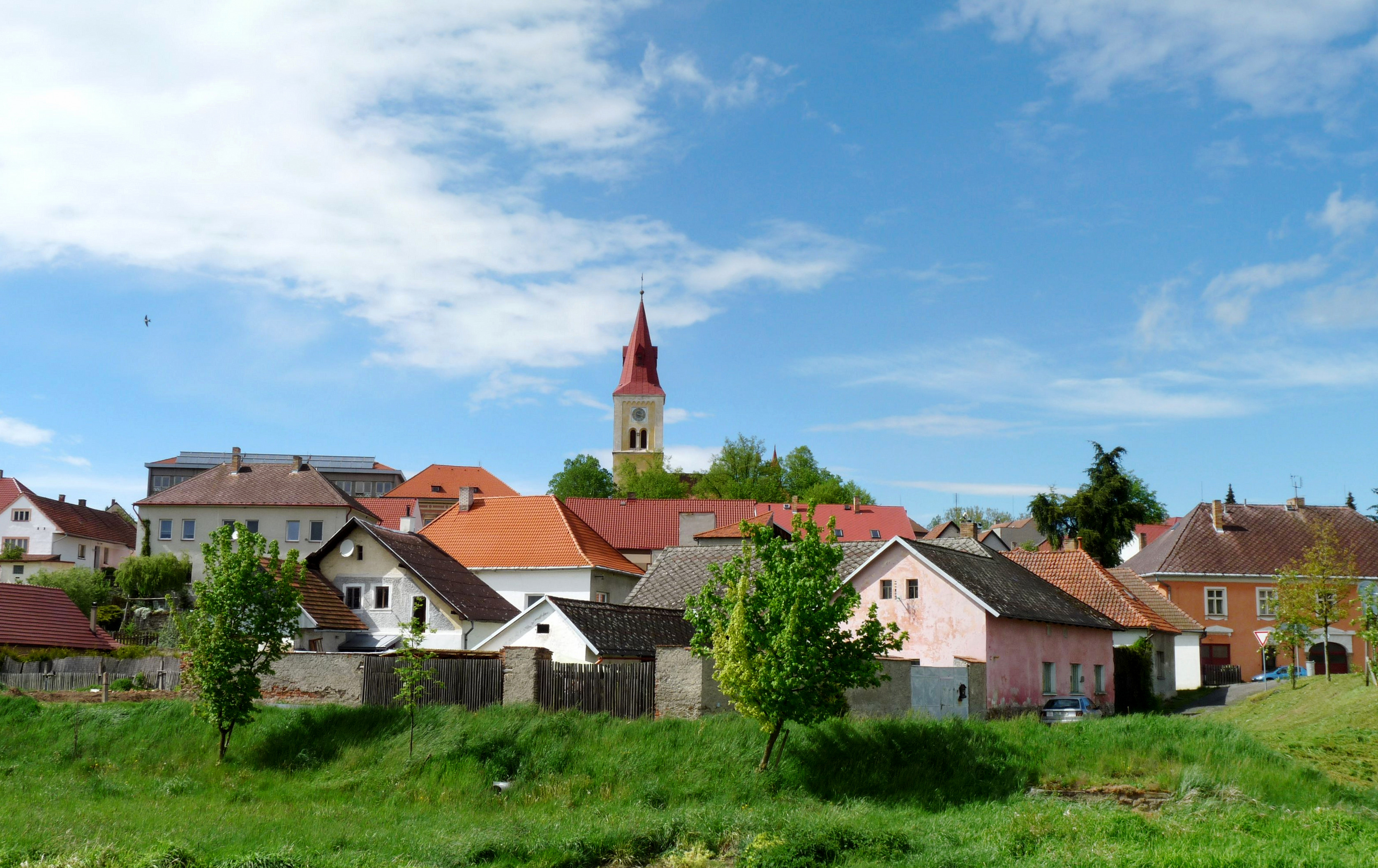
- View from the southeast

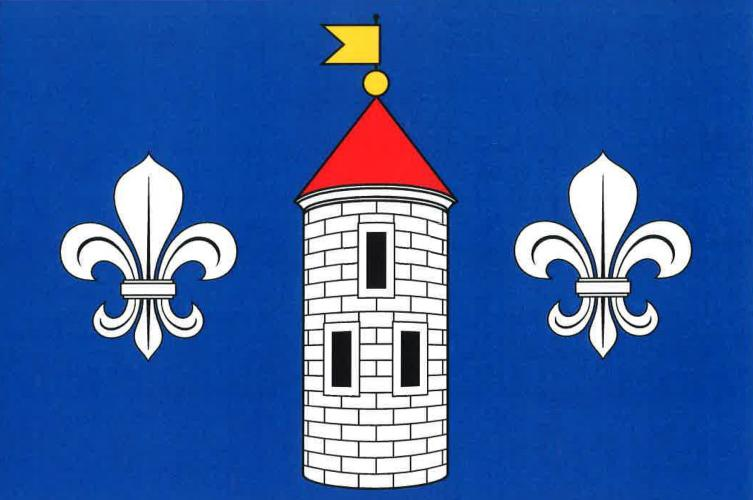
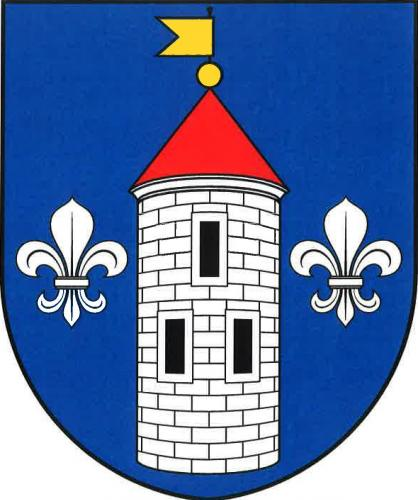
- Flag Coat of arms

- Location in the Czech Republic
- Coordinates: 49°30′46″N 15°6′22″E
- Country: Czech Republic
- Region: Vysočina
- District: Pelhřimov
- First mentioned: 1252

Area
  - Total: 13.63 km^{2} (5.26 sq mi)
- Elevation: 457 m (1,499 ft)

Population (2026-01-01)
  - Total: 629
  - Density: 46.1/km^{2} (120/sq mi)
- Time zone: UTC+1 (CET)
  - Summer (DST): UTC+2 (CEST)
- Postal codes: 394 21, 395 01
- Website: www.horepnik.cz

Hořepník is a municipality and village in Pelhřimov District in the Vysočina Region of the Czech Republic. It has about 600 inhabitants.

Hořepník lies approximately 13 kilometres (8 mi) northwest of Pelhřimov, 38 km (24 mi) west of Jihlava, and 80 km (50 mi) south-east of Prague.

== Administrative division ==
Hořepník consists of four municipal parts (in brackets population according to the 2021 census):

- Hořepník (551)
- Březina (21)
- Mašovice (10)
- Vítovice (19)

== Demographics ==
Historical population
Year	Pop.	±%
1869	1,551	—
1880	1,659	+7.0%
1890	1,619	−2.4%
1900	1,512	−6.6%
1910	1,381	−8.7%
1921	1,389	+0.6%
1930	1,227	−11.7%
1950	906	−26.2%
1961	966	+6.6%
1970	869	−10.0%
1980	701	−19.3%
1991	613	−12.6%
2001	631	+2.9%
2011	615	−2.5%
2021	601	−2.3%
Source: Censuses
