= Lukavice =

Lukavice may refer to places:

== Czech Republic ==
- Lukavice (Chrudim District), a municipality and village in the Pardubice Region
- Lukavice (Rychnov nad Kněžnou District), a municipality and village in the Hradec Králové Region
- Lukavice (Šumperk District), a municipality and village in the Olomouc Region
- Lukavice (Ústí nad Orlicí District), a municipality and village in the Pardubice Region
- Lukavice, a village and part of Strážov in the Plzeň Region
- Dolní Lukavice, a municipality and village in the Plzeň Region
- Horní Lukavice, a municipality and village in the Plzeň Region

== Bosnia and Herzegovina ==
- Lukavice, Sanski Most, a village in the Una-Sana Canton

== See also ==
- Lukavec (disambiguation)
- Lukavica (disambiguation)
