= Lukavec =

Lukavec may refer to places:

== Croatia ==
- Lukavec, Zagreb County, a village near Velika Gorica
- Lukavec, Varaždin County, a village near Ivanec

== Czech Republic ==
- Lukavec (Litoměřice District), a municipality and village in the Ústí nad Labem Region
- Lukavec (Pelhřimov District), a market town in the Vysočina Region
- Lukavec u Hořic, a municipality and village in the Hradec Králové Region
- Lukavec, a village and part of Fulnek in the Moravian-Silesian Region

== See also ==
- Lukavica (disambiguation)
- Lukavice (disambiguation)
- Lukavec (disambiguation)
- Lokavec (disambiguation)
- Lokovec
