= Furch =

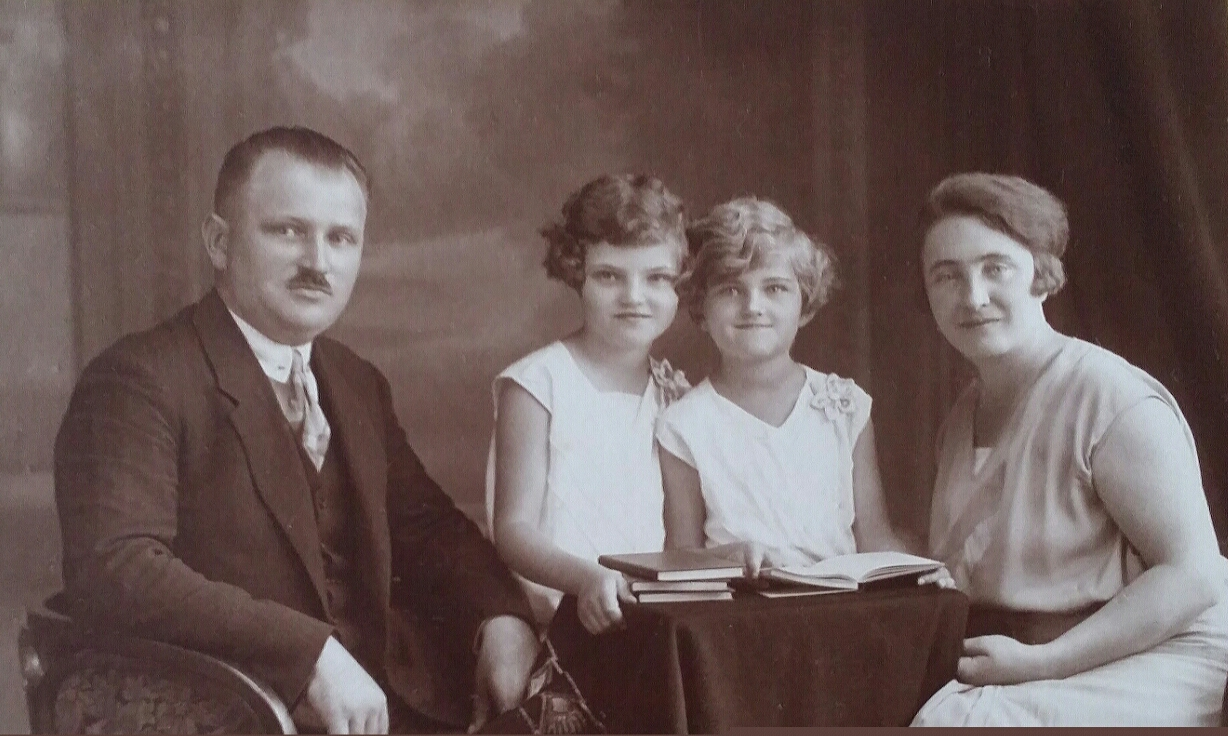
Ing. Miloslav Furch de Freiberg (director of mining corporation) with family (wife Pauline de Kuczera, daughters Milada and Jiřina)

Furch (too Furch de Kallenberger a Furch de Freiberg in Bohemia) is a surname of nobility which roots descend from Spain in XI century. Members of this nobility were famous in military services in battles in Perpignan, Gerona and Barcelona. Members of Furch often joined cavalry. Frequent links on members of this noble family are presented typically from 15th century to 19th century, specially events in Barcelona and Berg, 11 and 12 September 1714, when tragically ended dynasty war between Austria empire and Bourbon royal house.

Over centuries, Furch family was divided to France and Italy, after that, to Germany, Bohemia and Poland. In Thirty Years' War noble family Furch traveled with army in Bohemia where was founded ancestry line Furch de Freiberg (Pribram). Members of this lineage didn't get Inkolat right in Bohemia, and they acted in 19th and 20th century like directors of schools (Alois Furch de Freiberg), directors of mines (Ing. Miloslav Furch de Freiberg) and aristocratic estate administrators (Anton Furch de Freiberg). Per marriage in Chile, Sofia Luise Julia Furch, born 1874, with Eduard Eugen Richard Kallenberger, born 1873, was founded new noble name Furch de Kallenbeger. In 19th century, some members of this house moved to Chile, Valparaiso. Thanks to marriages, Furch was related with noble families Kallenberger, Kugler, Haugwitz de Biskupitz and Fischer.

Notable people with the surname include:

- Ales Furch (born 1997), Czech ice hockey player
- Dominik Furch (born 1990), Czech ice hockey player
- Julio Furch (born 1989), Argentine footballer
- Richard Furch, German music engineer, mixer, pianist, and composer
- Otto Furch, (1916–2002) – Czech Roman Catholic clergy, political prisoner of communist regime
- Vincenc Furch, (1817–1864) – Czech poet, dramatist and patriot

== Photos Family de Furch ==
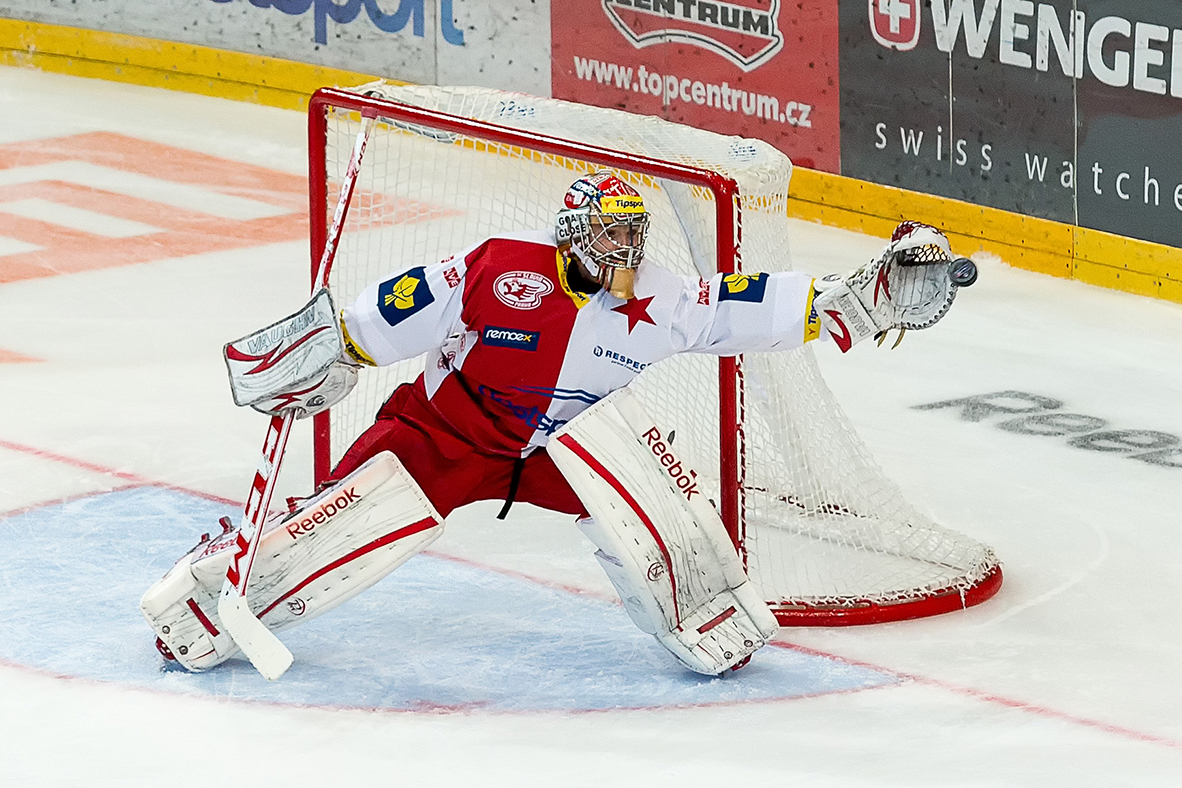
Dominik Furch

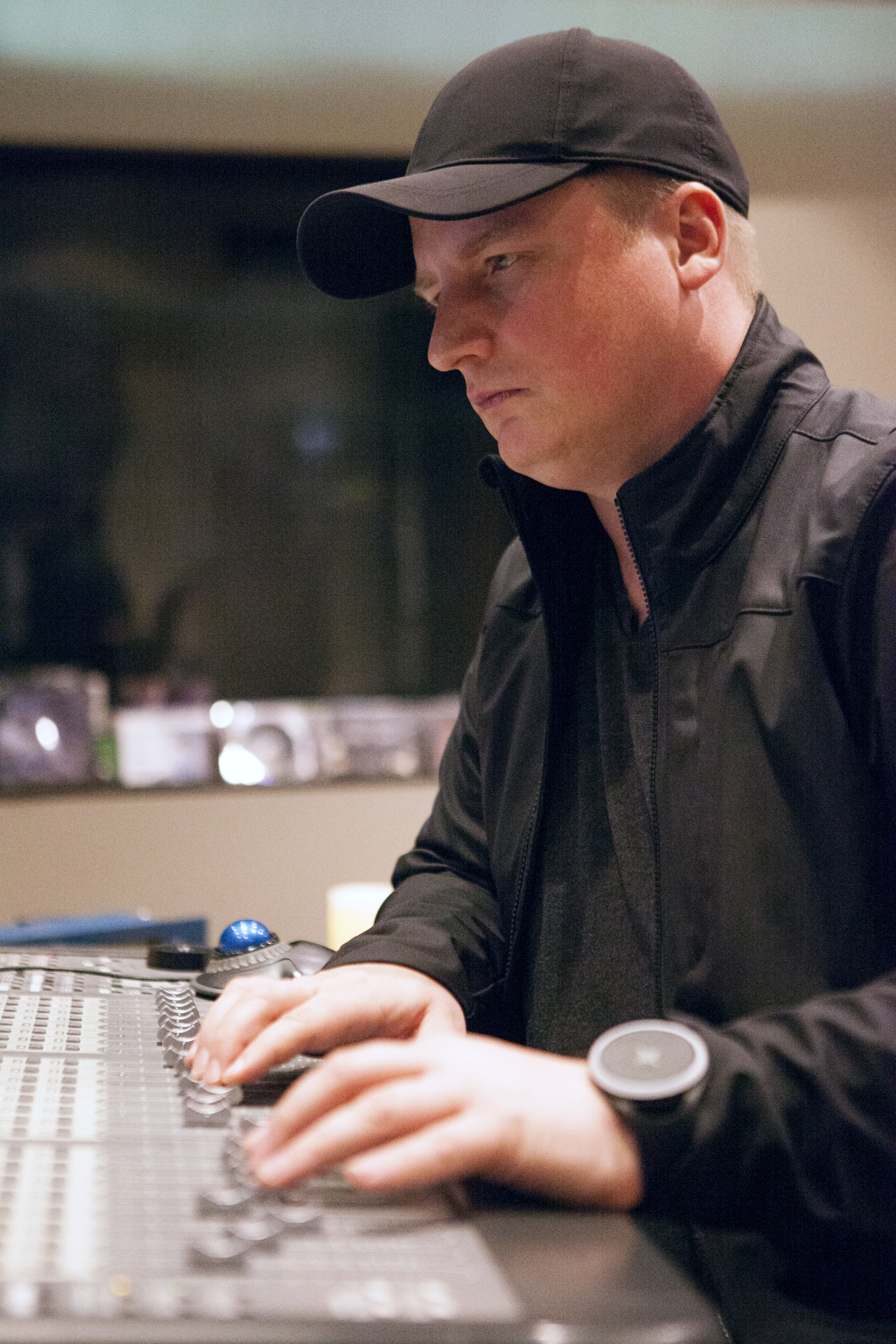
Richard Furch

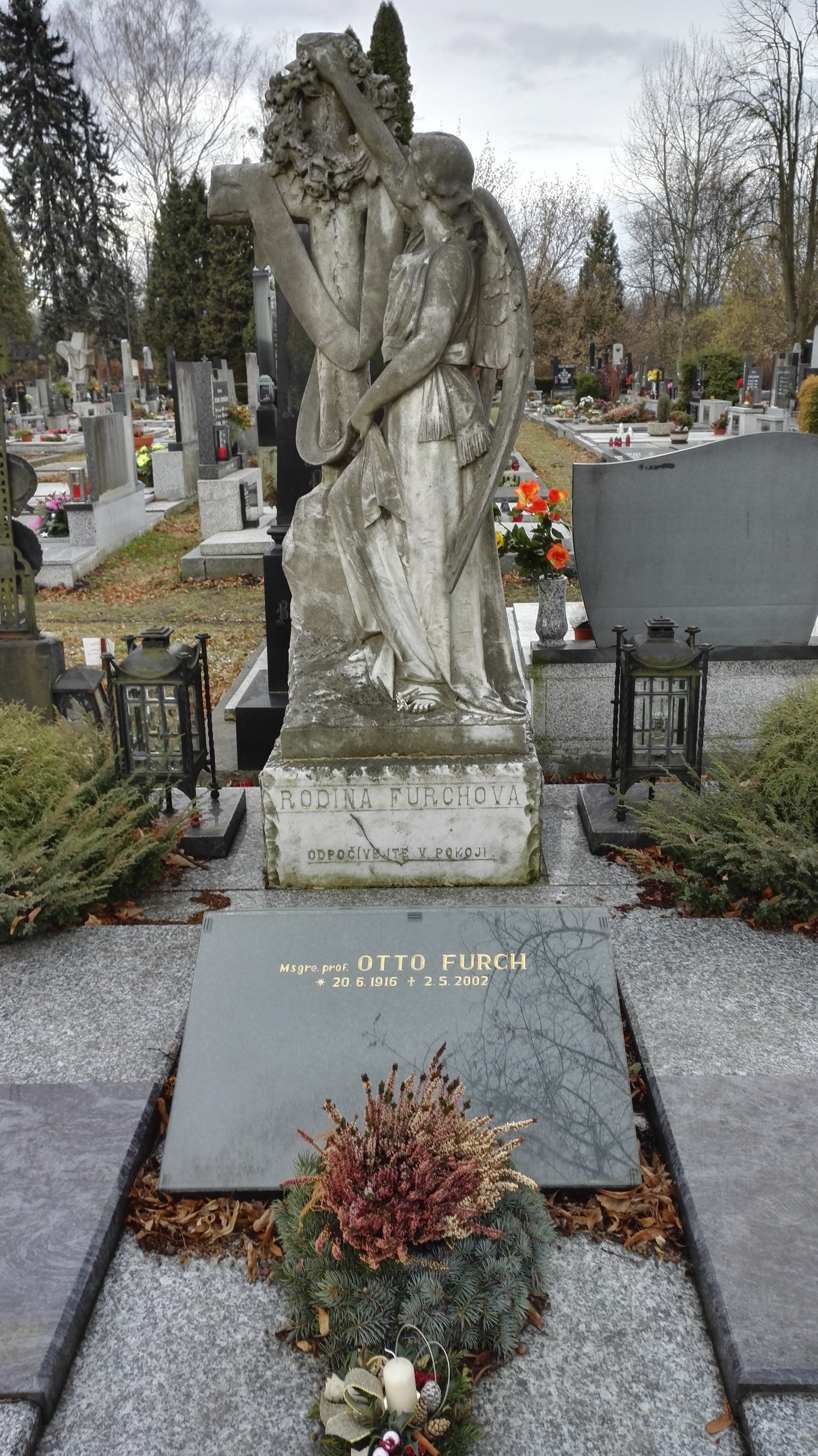
Otto Furch

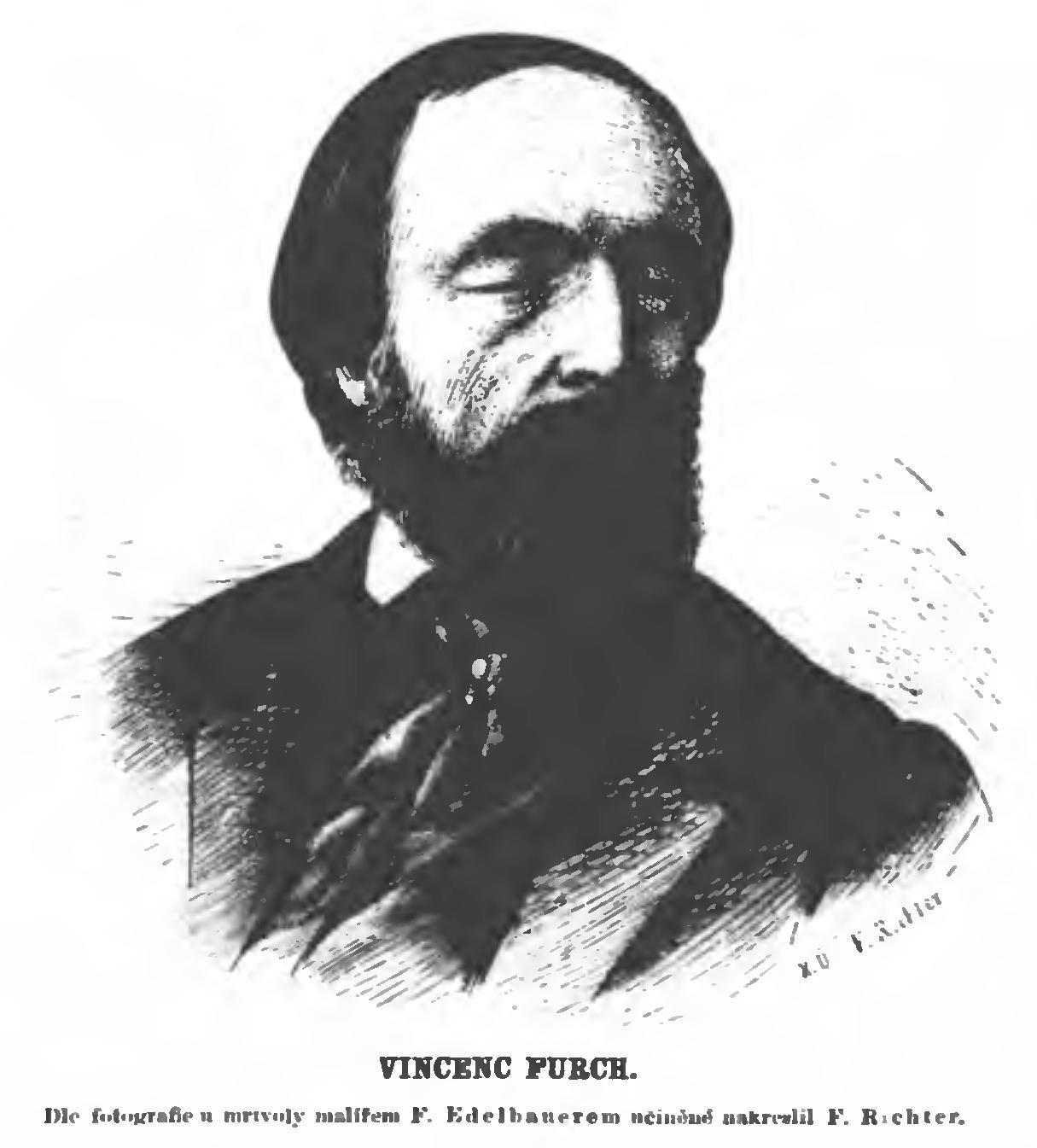
Vincenc Furch

== See also ==
- Furch Guitars, is a Czech guitar manufacturer
