= Lukavica =

Lukavica may refer to:

== Bosnia and Herzegovina ==
- Lukavica, Čelić, a village in Bosnia and Herzegovina
- Lukavica (Istočno Novo Sarajevo), a neighborhood in Bosnia and Herzegovina
- Lukavica (Gračanica), a village in Bosnia and Herzegovina
- Lukavica, Milići, a village in Republika Srpska, Bosnia and Herzegovina

== Serbia ==
- Lukavica (Dimitrovgrad), a village in Serbia
- Lukavica (Lazarevac), a village in Serbia
- Lukavica (Tutin), a village in Serbia

== Slovakia ==
- Lukavica, Bardejov District, a municipality in Slovakia
- Lukavica, Zvolen District, a municipality in Slovakia

== Belarus ==
- Lukavica, Belarus, a village

== See also ==
- Lukavec (disambiguation)
- Lukavice (disambiguation)
