= Łukawica =

Łukawica may refer to the following places:

- Łukawica, Lublin Voivodeship (east Poland)
- Łukawica, Podlaskie Voivodeship (north-east Poland)
- Łukawica, Lesko County in Subcarpathian Voivodeship (south-east Poland)
- Łukawica, Lubaczów County in Subcarpathian Voivodeship (south-east Poland)
- Łukawica, Świętokrzyskie Voivodeship (south-central Poland)
- Łukawica, Polish name for Lukavica, Belarus
