= Stolpersteine in Prague-Karlín =

Memorial installations in Czech Republic

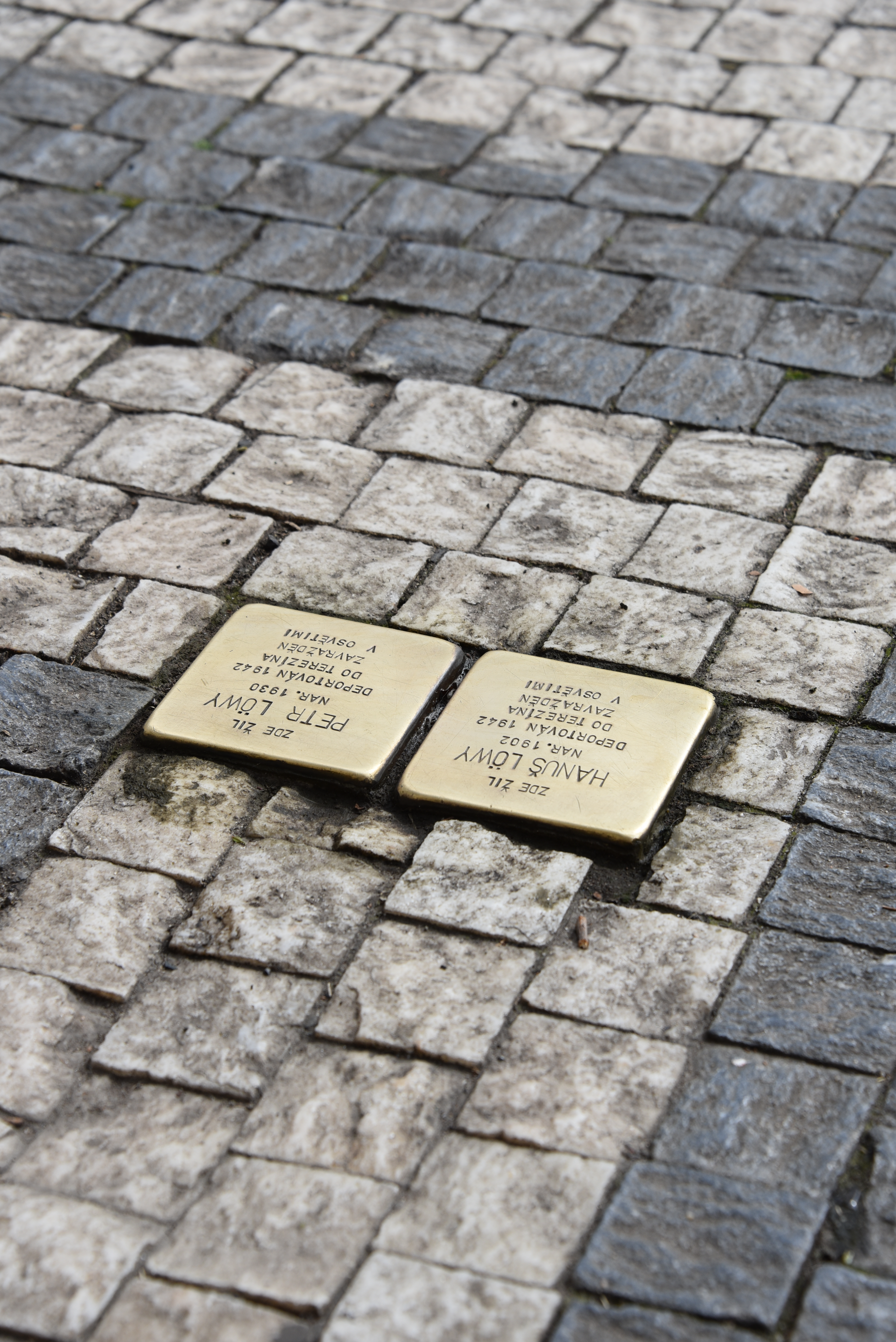
Stolpersteine for father and son Löwy in Prague-Karlín

This article lists the Stolpersteine in cadastral area Karlín of Prague. Since 2002, the district belongs to Praha 8. Stolpersteine is the German name for stumbling blocks colocated all over Europe by German artist Gunter Demnig. They remember the fate of the Nazi victims being murdered, deported, exiled or driven to suicide.

Generally, the stumbling blocks are posed in front of the building where the victims had their last self-chosen residence. The name of the Stolpersteine in Czech is: Kameny zmizelých, stones of the disappeared.

== Karlín ==
Stone	Inscription	Location	Life and death
	HERE LIVED; FRANTIŠEK GROSS; BORN 1892; DEPORTED; 1942 TO THERESIENSTADT; 1944 TO AUSCHWITZ; MURDERED	Vítkova 439/21	František Gross was born on 21 July 1892. His parents were Josef Gross (1862-1927) and Hermine née Taussig. He had a sister named Zdenka (born 1891). He became an engineer and married to Edith née Steinová (born on 1 November 1908 as a daughter of Siegfried Stein (1876-1941) and Hedwig née Taussigová (1886-1942)). The couple had at least one son, Pavel (see below). The last residence of the family before deportation was in Prague X, Terezínská 21/439. On 20 November 1942, he and his son were deported from Prague to Theresienstadt concentration camp by transport Cc. Their transport numbers were 488 and 490 of 1,002. They remained interned there for twenty-two months. On 28 September 1944, father and son were separated. The father was deported to Auschwitz concentration camp by transport Ek. His transport number was 1917 of 2,500. Ing. František Gross was murdered there by the Nazi regime. Three and a half weeks later, his son was also deported to Auschwitz and murdered at the age of 14. Also his mother-in-law was murdered during the Shoah. The fate of his wife is unknown.
	HERE LIVED; PAVEL GROSS; BORN 1930; DEPORTED; 1942 TO THERESIENSTADT; 1944 TO AUSCHWITZ; MURDERED	Vítkova 439/21	Pavel Gross was born on 27 October 1930. His parents were František Gross and Edith née Steinová. The last residence of the family before deportation was in Prague X, Terezínská 21/439. On 20 November 1942, Pavel Gross and his father were deported from Prague to Theresienstadt concentration camp by transport Cc. Their transport numbers were 488 and 490 of 1,002. They remained interned there for nearly two years. On 28 September 1943 father and son were separated. František Gross was deported to Auschwitz concentration camp and murdered at an unknown date. Three and a half weeks later, on 23 October 1944, also the son was deported to Auschwitz by transport Et. His transport number was 78 of 1,714. Pavel Gross was murdered there by the Nazi regime at age 14. The fate of his mother is not known. His maternal grandmother, Hedwig Steinová née Taussigová, was murdered in Izbica.
	HERE LIVED; EVA HELLEROVÁ; BORN 1938; DEPORTED 1942; TO THERESIENSTADT; MURDERED; IN AUSCHWITZ	Brezinova 5	Eva Hellerová was born on 17 February 1938. Her parents were Dr. Arnošt Heller and Olga née Stutzová (see below). Her last residence before deportation was in Prague X, Litomyšlská 5. On 22 December 1942, she and her mother were deported to Theresienstadt concentration camp by transport Ck. Their transport numbers were 809 and 810 of 1,005. They remained interned there for nearly two years. On 4 October 1944, she was deported to Auschwitz concentration camp by transport En. Their transport numbers was 1004 and 1105 of 1,500. There she was murdered by the Nazi regime at the age of 6. Also her mother died. Her father could survive the Shoah. He founded a new family after the fall of the Nazi regime.
	HERE LIVED; OLGA HELLEROVÁ; BORN 1914; DEPORTED 1942; TO THERESIENSTADT; MURDERED; IN AUSCHWITZ	Brezinova 5	Olga Hellerová was born on 15 March 1914 in Libochovice. She was married to Dr. Arnošt Heller. The couple had at least one daughter, Eva (born 1938, see above). Her last residence before deportation was in Prague X, Litomyšlská 5. On 22 December 1942, she and her daughter were deported to Theresienstadt concentration camp by transport Ck. Their transport numbers were 809 and 810 of 1,005. They remained interned there for nearly two years. On 4 October 1944, she was deported to Auschwitz concentration camp by transport En. Their transport numbers was 1004 and 1105 1,500. Their mother and daughter, age 30 and 6, were murdered by the Nazi regime.
	HERE LIVED; HANA HOJTAŠOVÁ; BORN 1932; DEPORTED 1942; TO THERESIENSTADT; MURDERED	Křižíkova 254/5	Hana Hojtašová was born on 10 December 1932. Her parents were Karel Hojtaš and Ela Hojtašová. She had an older brother, Jiří (born on 29 May 1930). The last residence of the family before deportation was in Prague X, Sudetská 5 (today Křižíkova). On 15 May 1942, she and her family were deported to Theresienstadt concentration camp by transport Au 1. Her transport number was 729 of 1,001, of her brother 726 and of her parents 727 and 728. After two days, on 17 May 1944, the family was deported to Lublin by transport Ay. According to holocaust cz. the family had the same transport numbers as in the previous transport. There the whole family was murdered by the Nazi regime. Only the day of the death of her father is known, he was killed on 29 August 1942 in Majdanek.
	HERE LIVED; ARNOŠT HÜBSCH; BORN 1905; DEPORTED; 1942 TO THERESIENSTADT; 1942 TO TRAWNIKI; MURDERED 8.8.1942; IN MAJDANEK	Vítkova 333/36	Arnošt Hübsch was born on 22 November 1905 in Lukavec in the Pelhřimov District. His parents were Kamila and Karel Hübsch. He was a shop owner and married to Anna née Khámová. The couple had a daughter named, Irena. His last residence before deportation was in Ondřejov, then in Prague XII, Schwerinova 15. On 5 June 1942, he was deported to Theresienstadt concentration camp by transport AAb. His transport number was 218 of 745. After seven days there, on 12 June 1942, he was deported to Trawniki concentration camp by transport AAk. His transport number was 422 of 1,027. He was murdered by the Nazi regime on 8 August 1942 in Majdanek. The fate of his wife is unknown. His only daughter survived, studied, achieved a doctorate in natural sciences, married and took the name Kimlová. In 1991, she submitted the report on his death to Yad Vashem.
	HERE LIVED; JOSEF KRAUS; BORN 1876; DEPORTED; 1942 TO THERESIENSTADT; 1942 TO TREBLINKA; MURDERED	Sokolovská 30/59	Josef Kraus was born on 6 September 1876. He was married to Emma. The last residence of the couple before deportation was in Prague X, Královská 30 (today Sokolovská). On 20 July 1942, Josef Kraus and his wife were deported from Prague to Theresienstadt concentration camp by transport AAs. His transport number was 524 of 1,000. They remained interned there for three months. On 22 October 1942, they were deported to Auschwitz concentration camp by transport Bx. His transport number was 11 of 2,033. Emma Krausová and Josef Kraus were murdered there by the Nazi regime.
	HERE LIVED; EMMA KRAUSOVÁ; BORN 1875; DEPORTED; 1942 TO THERESIENSTADT; 1942 TO TREBLINKA; MURDERED	Sokolovská 30/59	Emma Krausová was born on 11 March 1875. She was married to Josef Kraus. The last residence of the couple before deportation was in Prague X, Královská 30 (today Sokolovská). On 20 July 1942, Emma Krausová and her husband were deported from Prague to Theresienstadt concentration camp by transport AAs. Her transport number was 525 of 1,000. They remained interned there for three months. On 22 October 1942, they were deported to Auschwitz concentration camp by transport Bx. Her transport number was 12 of 2,033. Emma Krausová and Josef Kraus were murdered there by the Nazi regime.
	HERE LIVED; HANUŠ LÖWY; BORN 1902; DEPORTED 1942; TO THERESIENSTADT; MURDERED; IN AUSCHWITZ	Sokolovská 40/57	Hanuš Löwy was born on 30 March 1902. His parents were Ferdinand Löwy and Regina née Schulz. He had three older brothers, Antonin (born 1895), Josef (born on 2 December 1896) and František (1899-1965). He was married to Marta née Holubová (born on 8 April 1905). The couple had a son, Petr (born 1930). The last residence of father and son before deportation was in Prague XII, Mánesova 34. On 22 December 1942, Hanuš Löwy and his son were deported to Theresienstadt concentration camp by transport Ck. His transport number was 551 of 1,005. There they were interned for 17 months. On 18 May 1944, they were deported to Auschwitz concentration camp by transport Eb. His transport number was 570 of 2,500. Father and son were gassed by the Nazi regime on the day of their arrival. The fate of his wife, his parents and his brother Antonin is unknown. František Löwy survived. Josef Löwy, his wife Karolina and their daughter Hana (age 14) were all murdered on 9 May 1942 in Sobibór extermination camp.
	HERE LIVED; PETR LÖWY; BORN 1930; DEPORTED 1942; TO THERESIENSTADT; MURDERED; IN AUSCHWITZ	Sokolovská 40/57	Petr Löwy was born on 12 October 1930. His parents were Hanuš Löwy and Marta née Holubová. The last residence of father and son before deportation was in Prague XII, Mánesova 34. On 22 December 1942, Petr Löwy and his father were deported to Theresienstadt concentration camp by transport Ck. His transport number was 550 of 1,005. There they were interned for 17 months. On 18 May 1944, he was deported to Auschwitz concentration camp by transport Eb. His transport number was 571 of 2,500. Father and son were gassed by the Nazi regime on the day of their arrival. The fate of his mother is unknown.
	HERE LIVED; VIKTOR PICK; BORN 1893; DEPORTED; 1943 TO THERESIENSTADT; 1944 TO AUSCHWITZ; MURDERED	Jirsíkova 540/4	Viktor Pick was born on 22 April 1893 in Prague. His parents were Emanuel Pick (born on 19 January 1862) and Ernestine née Lokesch (born on 23 September 1867 in Prague). He had one brother and three sisters. His last residence before deportation was in Prague X, Jílovská 4. On 13 July 1943, he was arrested and deported to Theresienstadt concentration camp by transport Di. His transport number was 569 of 839. There he was interned for 15 months. On 16 October 1944, he was deported to Auschwitz concentration camp by transport Er. His transport number was 1232 of 1,500. There he died. On 15 October 1942, his mother was deported from Theresienstadt to the Treblinka extermination camp with transport Bv and transport number 1364. All 2,000 people on this transport were murdered by the Nazi regime, including Ernestine Picková. His sister Lilly, her husband Richard Lustig and their daughter were all murdered in the course of the Shoah. On 17 May 1942, they were deported to Lublin. The fate of his father and his brother is unknown.
	HERE LIVED; DAVID SÜSSMANN; BORN 1893; DEPORTED 1942; TO THERESIENSTADT; MURDERED 1944; IN AUSCHWITZ	Sokolovská 449/128	David Süssmann, also Sussmann or Zisman, was born on 18 February 1893 in Budapest. His parents were Leo Süssmann (born on 26 July 1868) and Mina née Mayer (1869–1924). He had two sisters, Eugenie Jenny (born on 6 November 1895) and Yulia (born on 14 November 1899 in Budapest), and one brother, Moritz (born on 6 June 1901 in Budapest). He was a clerk and married to Markéta née Fischl. The couple had at least one son, Karl. The last residence of the family before deportation was in Prague X, Královská 128 (today Sokolovská). On 23 July 1942, David Süssmann and his wife were deported to Theresienstadt concentration camp by transport AAt. His transport number was 192 of 1,000. His brother and his father were already there. Step by step the family was extinct. His father, who had arrived one month earlier in Theresienstadt, died there on 4 July 1943. After more than two years of imprisonment, the Süssmann couple were separated. On 28 September 1944, David Süssmann was deported to Auschwitz concentration camp by transport Ek. His transport number was 905 of 2,500. He was killed there. Three days later, also Markéta Süssmannová was deported to Auschwitz and murdered there. One month later, also his brother Moritz was deported to Auschwitz and murdered there. It is known, that their son Karl was married to Svetla née Solar, that they had a child and that he died in the German city Hannover. But his whereabouts during the Nazi regime are unknown and it is not known if his decease occurred during the Nazi reign or later. The fate of his daughter-in-law and his grandchild is unknown. David Süssmann's sisters could emigrate and survive. Eugenie, who was married to Walter Urbach and had a child with him, lost her husband in 1944 in Auschwitz. She died in 1963 in the USA. His other sister, Julia, also lost her husband in Auschwitz. Her husband's name was Ignaz Bobasch, also Itchak. They had two daughters, both born in Czechoslovakia in the 1920s. Julia died in 1991 in Israel at age 92.
	HERE LIVED; MARKETÁ; SÜSSMANN; BORN 1900; DEPORTED 1942; TO THERESIENSTADT; MURDERED 1944	Sokolovská 449/128	Markéta Süssmannová née Fischl, also Margarethe or Gretel, was born on 3 July 1900. Her parents were Karl Fischl (1864-1906) and Kamilla née Kuh (born 1879). She had a brother, Hugo (born 1899). She was married to David Süssmann. The couple had at least one son, Karl. The last residence of the family before deportation was in Prague X, Královská 128 (today Sokolovská). On 23 July 1942, Markéta Süssmannová and her husband were deported to Theresienstadt concentration camp by transport AAt. Her transport number was 191 of 1,000. After more than two years of imprisonment, the couple were separated. On 28 September 1944, her husband was deported to Auschwitz concentration camp. Three days later, also Markéta Süssmannová was deported to Auschwitz by transport Em. Her transport number was 1418 of 1,501. Both husband and wife were murdered by the Nazi regime. It is known, that her son Karl was married to Svetla née Solar, that they had a child and that her son died in the German city Hannover. But is not known if his decease occurred during the Nazi reign or later. The fate of her daughter-in-law and her grandchild is unknown. The fate of her mother, her brother, his wife and his daughter is also unknown.
	HERE LIVED; OSKAR WIENER; BORN 1873; DEPORTED 1942; TO THERESIENSTADT; MURDERED 20.4.1944; THERE	Sokolovská 75/103	Oskar Wiener was born on 4 March 1873 in Prague. His parents were Ignaz Wiener (died on 18 November 1908) and Emma née Wien (born 1846, died on 20 February 1908). He had a brother, named Paul. His last residence before deportation was in Prague X, Královská 103. On 6 July 1942, he was arrested and deported to Theresienstadt concentration camp by transport AAn. His transport number was 403 of 1,000. There he died on 20 April 1944. The fate of his brother is unknown.

== Dates of collocations ==
According to the website of Gunter Demnig the Stolpersteine of Prague were posed on 8 October 2008, 7 November 2009, 12 June 2010, 13 to 15 July 2011 and on 17 July 2013 by the artist himself. A further collocation occurred on 28 October 2012, but is not mentioned on Demnig's page.

The Czech Stolperstein project was initiated in 2008 by the Česká unie židovské mládeže (Czech Union of Jewish Youth) and was realized with the patronage of the Mayor of Prague.

== See also ==
- List of places with Stolpersteine
