= Jan Autengruber =

Post-impressionist painter

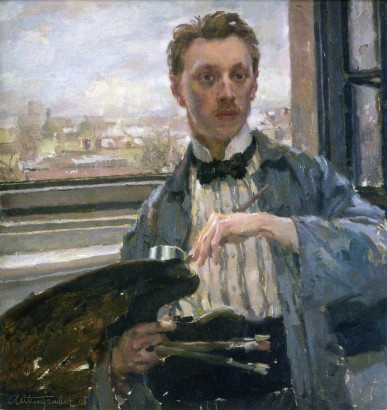
Self-portrait (1913)

Jan Autengruber (25 April 1887, Pacov – 15 July 1920, Prague) was a Post-Impressionist painter.

== Biography ==
After the early death of his father, his family moved to České Budějovice. After completing his primary education, he was accepted at the Academy of Arts, Architecture and Design in Prague. After two years, he transferred to the Academy of Fine Arts, Munich, where he was a two-time recipient of the annual award.

He achieved very little critical attention in his home country, so he exhibited widely throughout Germany: in Munich, Berlin, Dresden, Mannheim, Hannover, Cologne, Hamburg, and Frankfurt. In 1913, he was awarded a scholarship to study in Italy.

During the World War I, he attempted to avoid being drafted by studying restorative art at the Munich Academy, but it was only a short reprieve and he was mustered into service at Jindřichův Hradec. He managed to survive the war and settled in Prague, where he took courses in art history at the Faculty of Arts, Charles University.

In 1919, he married the artist Hana Jedličková (1888–1970). The following year, he became a victim of the flu pandemic, dying from a combination of flu and pneumonia.

His wife spent her life promoting his works. A major retrospective was held in 2002 at the National Gallery in Prague, followed by another in 2009 at the West Bohemian Gallery in Plzeň.

== Selected paintings ==
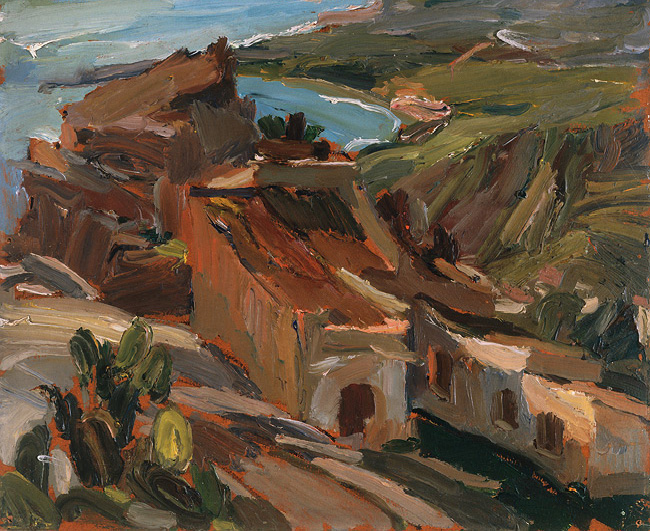
View of Naples (?)

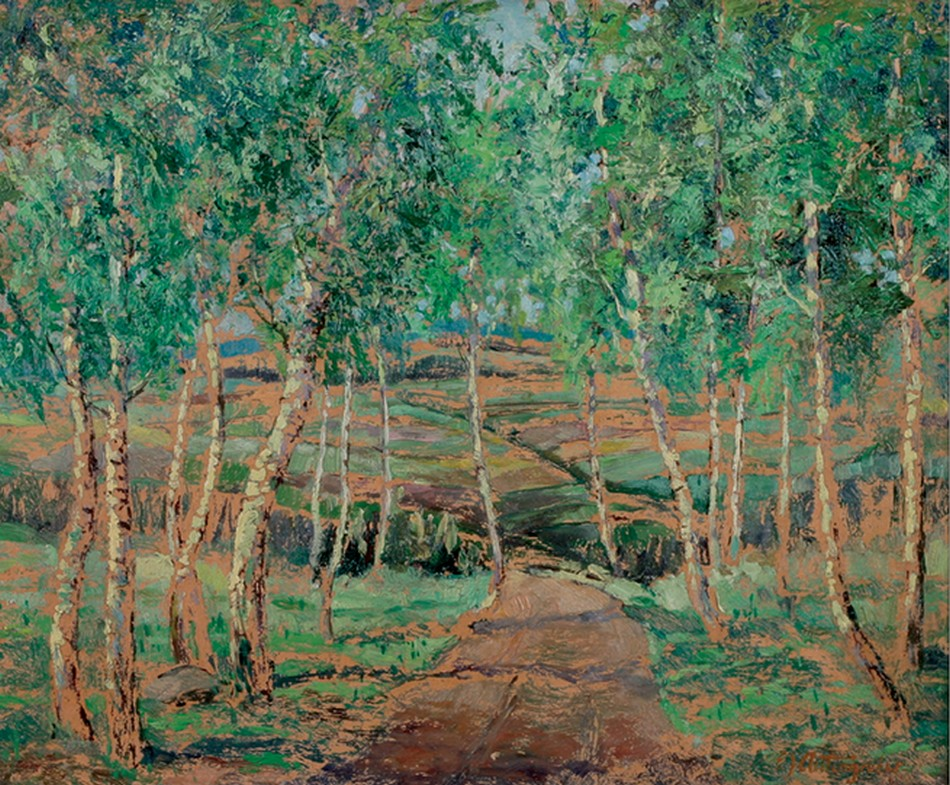
Path in a Birch Grove

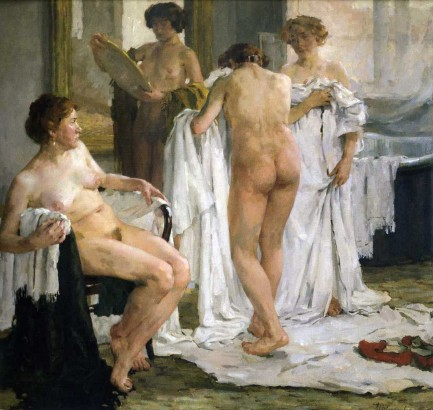
Bathing

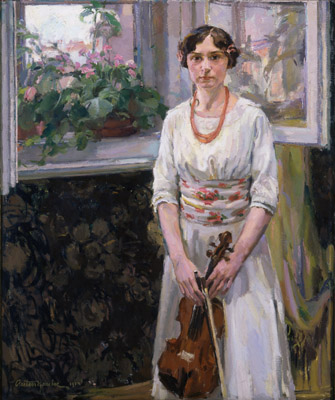
Violinist
