= Antonín Sova =

Czech poet and writer

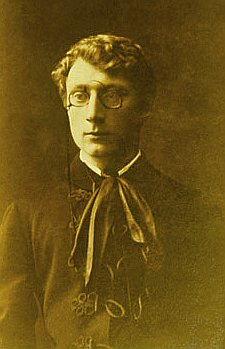
Antonín Sova

Antonín Sova (26 February 1864 – 16 August 1928) was a Czech poet and director of Prague Municipal Library.

== Life ==
He was born in Pacov, a small town in South Bohemia, then part of the Austrian Empire, but from the age of two he grew up in nearby Lukavec. His father, Jan, was a teacher and choirmaster who occasionally composed. His mother died when he was 15 and his father married again (Sova never had a positive relationship with his stepmother Sabina). In Lukavec, Antonín, became acquainted with the sisters of Jaroslav Vrchlický. He studied at the grammar school in Pelhřimov, Tábor, and from 1881 to 1885 in Písek. He met the Písek-based poet Adolf Heyduk who helped him publish his first poems in literary magazines (he used the pen-names Ilja Georgov and for Lumír Valburga Turková). While at school, he received the worst possible mark for morale because he ignored the interdict and wore a Czech tricolor tie in a park.

He started studying law in Prague but he did not finish for lack of money. Jaroslav Vrchlický helped him find employment in Otto's encyclopedia editorial department which lasted for only a year. His next job was at the medical department of the Prague municipality. Eventually, from 1898 till he retired, he worked as a director of the Prague Municipal Library. He married Marie Kovaříková, who was almost 20 years younger, in 1900, and had a son Jan with her a year later. Their marriage broke up after several years. The poet contracted a disease that paralysed him for the last two decades of his life (probably syphilis).

After the constitution of Czechoslovakia in 1918, he lived in Prague and was often visited by younger poets of various styles and political inclinations. In 1924, he moved "in his horsehair grave" to Pacov, where he died on a stormy August night in 1928. The funeral took place in Prague but his ashes were taken to a granite stone in Pacov.

== Early literary career ==
In 1897, Sova was among the writers who established the first Czech official literary association, called Máj. His first published poetry collections were Realistické sloky (Realistic strophes, 1890), Květy intimních nálad (Flowers of Intimate Moods, 1891), Z mého kraje (From My Country, 1893), Soucit a vzdor (Compassion and Defiance, 1894), and Zlomená duše (Broken Soul, 1895).

Sova was a supporter of the progressive national movement of the 1890s connected with the Omladina Trial. Together with 11 other writers, he signed the manifesto called Česká moderna in 1895 to demand free speech, social reforms and individualism in art. The reflection of the manifesto in Sova's work is the collection Vybouřené smutky (Uprisen Griefs, 1897).

== Theodor Mommsen ==
To you, who have treacherously assailed my nation, covetous dotard,
Brutish, overweening! To you, on the brink of the grave,
Arrogant bastard of Roman emperors and conquering Germania.
To you, dotard, blinded by vainglory,
I chant the infuriate song of a barbarian, aroused by the smiting of hoofs.
With metallic buffetings
Scornfully I smite your enwrinkled visage,
O bestial fanatic of relentless kaiserdom;
Your shrivelled temples I smite, your turgid Neronic lips I smite
Covered with foaming of impotent fury!

— Opening verses of To Theodor Mommsen, translated by Paul Selver for The New Age, 1916

In 1897, Theodor Mommsen wrote a nationalist letter addressed to Germans in Austria (An die Deutschen in Österreich) which was published in Vienna's Neue Freie Presse. Mommsen called Czechs "apostles of barbarism" and wrote that "the Czech skull is impervious to reason, but it is susceptible to blows". Antonín Sova wrote an answer in verses, To Theodor Mommsen.

The poem, in which he calls Mommsen a "covetous dotard" and an "arrogant spokesman of slavery", became the national answer to the German imperialism of that time, and Sova started to be one of the most famous poets of his generation.

== Later work ==
- Údolí nového království (Valley of a New Kingdom, 1900), Dobrodružství odvahy (Adventures of Courage, 1906) – collections of social poetry, the new utopian kingdom is a symbol of hope
- Ještě jednou se vrátíme (We Will Return Once More, 1900) – intimate poetry about passionate love and the bitterness of life
- Lyriky lásky a života (Lyrics of Love and Life, 1907), Drsná láska (Scathing Love, 1927) – collections of poems about falling into and recovering from love
- Povídky a menší črty (1903), O milkování, lásce a zradě (1909) – collections of short stories
- Ivův román (Ivo's Novel, 1902), Výpravy chudých (The Poor's Tours, 1903), Tóma Bojar (1910) – psychological and social novels
- Pankrác Budecius, kantor (Pankrác Budecius the Teacher, 1916) – novel about a rural teacher in the 18th century
