= Aleš Furch =

Czech ice hockey player

- Born: December 24, 1997 (age 27) Horni Lukavice, Czech Republic
- Height: 6 ft 0 in (183 cm)
- Weight: 179 lb (81 kg; 12 st 11 lb)
- Position: Centre
- Shoots: Left
- Czech 2. liga team Former teams: HC Slovan Ústí nad Labem; HC Slavia Praha
- Playing career: 2015–present

Aleš Furch (born December 24, 1997) is a Czech professional ice hockey centre. He is currently playing with HC Slovan Ústečtí Lvi of the 2nd Czech Republic Hockey League.

Furch previously played one game in the Czech Extraliga with HC Slavia Praha during the 2014–15 Czech Extraliga season.
