= Pacov =

- Town
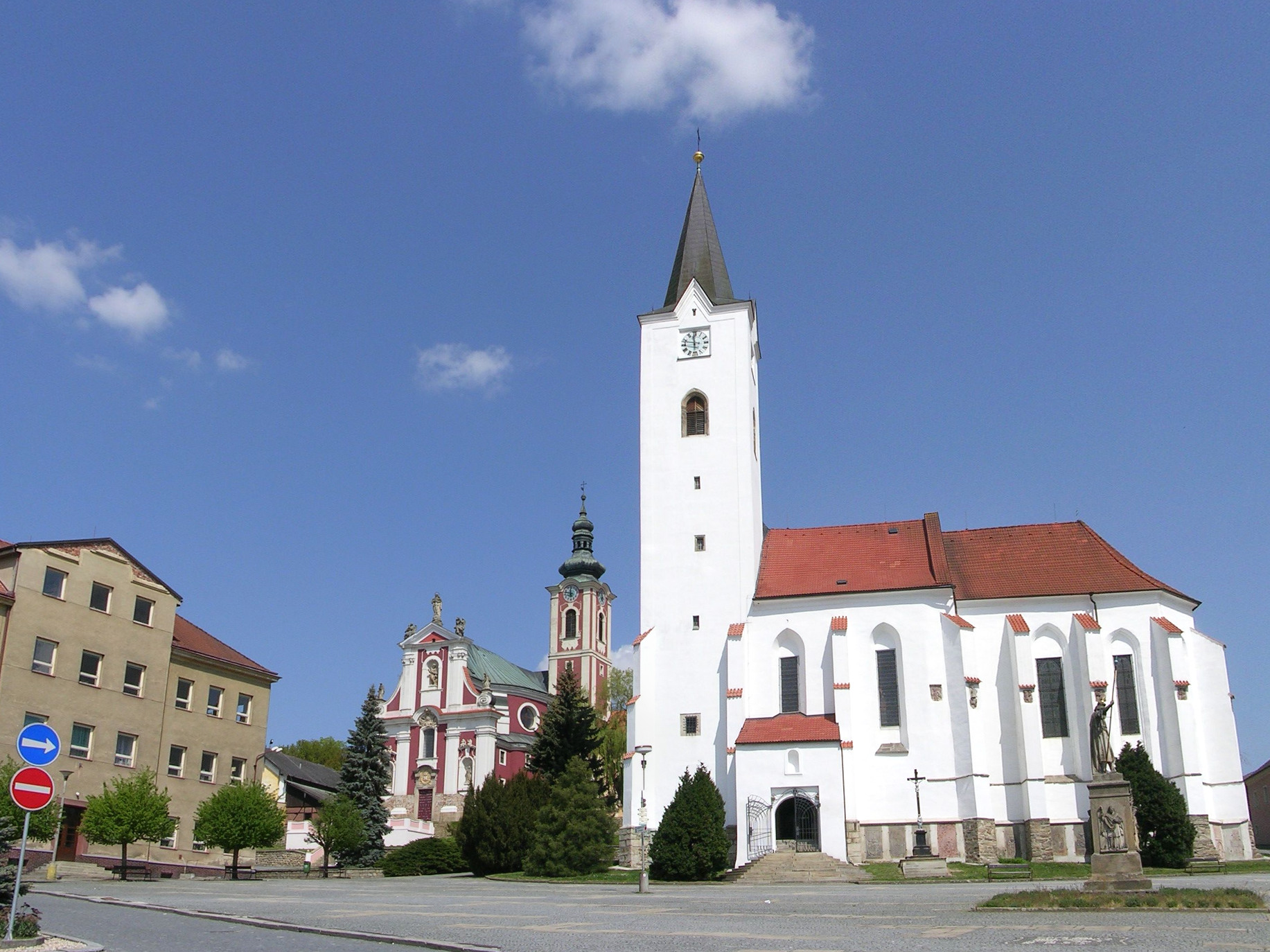
- Church of Saint Wenceslaus (left) and Church of Saint Michael the Archangel (right)

- Flag Coat of arms

- Location in the Czech Republic
- Coordinates: 49°28′15″N 15°0′6″E
- Country: Czech Republic
- Region: Vysočina
- District: Pelhřimov
- First mentioned: 1316

Government
  - Mayor: Tomáš Kocour

Area
  - Total: 35.86 km^{2} (13.85 sq mi)
- Elevation: 562 m (1,844 ft)

Population (2026-01-01)
  - Total: 4,757
  - Density: 132.7/km^{2} (343.6/sq mi)
- Time zone: UTC+1 (CET)
  - Summer (DST): UTC+2 (CEST)
- Postal code: 395 01
- Website: www.mestopacov.cz

Pacov (Czech pronunciation: [ˈpatsof]; German: Patzau) is a town in Pelhřimov District in the Vysočina Region of the Czech Republic. It has about 4,800 inhabitants. The town is located in the Křemešník Highlands, near the Trnava River.

Pacov was probably founded in the late 13th century. The historic town centre is well preserved and is protected as an urban monument zone.

== Administrative division ==
Pacov consists of six municipal parts (in brackets population according to the 2021 census):

- Pacov (4,122)
- Bedřichov (46)
- Jetřichovec (167)
- Roučkovice (140)
- Velká Rovná (81)
- Zhoř (25)

== Etymology ==
The name Pacov is derived from the personal name Pac, meaning "Pac's (court)".

== Geography ==
Pacov is located about 16 kilometres (10 mi) west of Pelhřimov and 42 km (26 mi) west of Jihlava, and lies directly on the 15th meridian east. The town lies in the Křemešník Highlands. The highest point is a nameless hill at 601 m (1,972 ft) above sea level. The Trnava River flows through the western part of the municipal territory, then it turns and flows along the northern municipal border. The territory of Pacov is rich in small fishponds.

== History ==
The first written mention of Pacov is from 1316. The settlement was probably founded in the late 13th century.

Pacov flourished in the 15th and 16th centuries. During this period, it obtained the town rights. The development ended with the Battle of White Mountain and Thirty Years' War. The second period of prosperity occurred in the 19th century. The foundations were laid for the current industry: food machinery industry and leather accessories manufacture. In 1888, the railway was built, which helped further expansion.

== Demographics ==
Historical population

Year	Pop.	±%
1869	4,229	—
1880	4,147	−1.9%
1890	4,095	−1.3%
1900	4,114	+0.5%
1910	4,264	+3.6%

Year	Pop.	±%
1921	4,076	−4.4%
1930	3,787	−7.1%
1950	3,663	−3.3%
1961	4,026	+9.9%
1970	4,577	+13.7%

Year	Pop.	±%
1980	5,180	+13.2%
1991	5,201	+0.4%
2001	5,232	+0.6%
2011	4,972	−5.0%
2021	4,581	−7.9%

Source: Censuses

== Transport ==
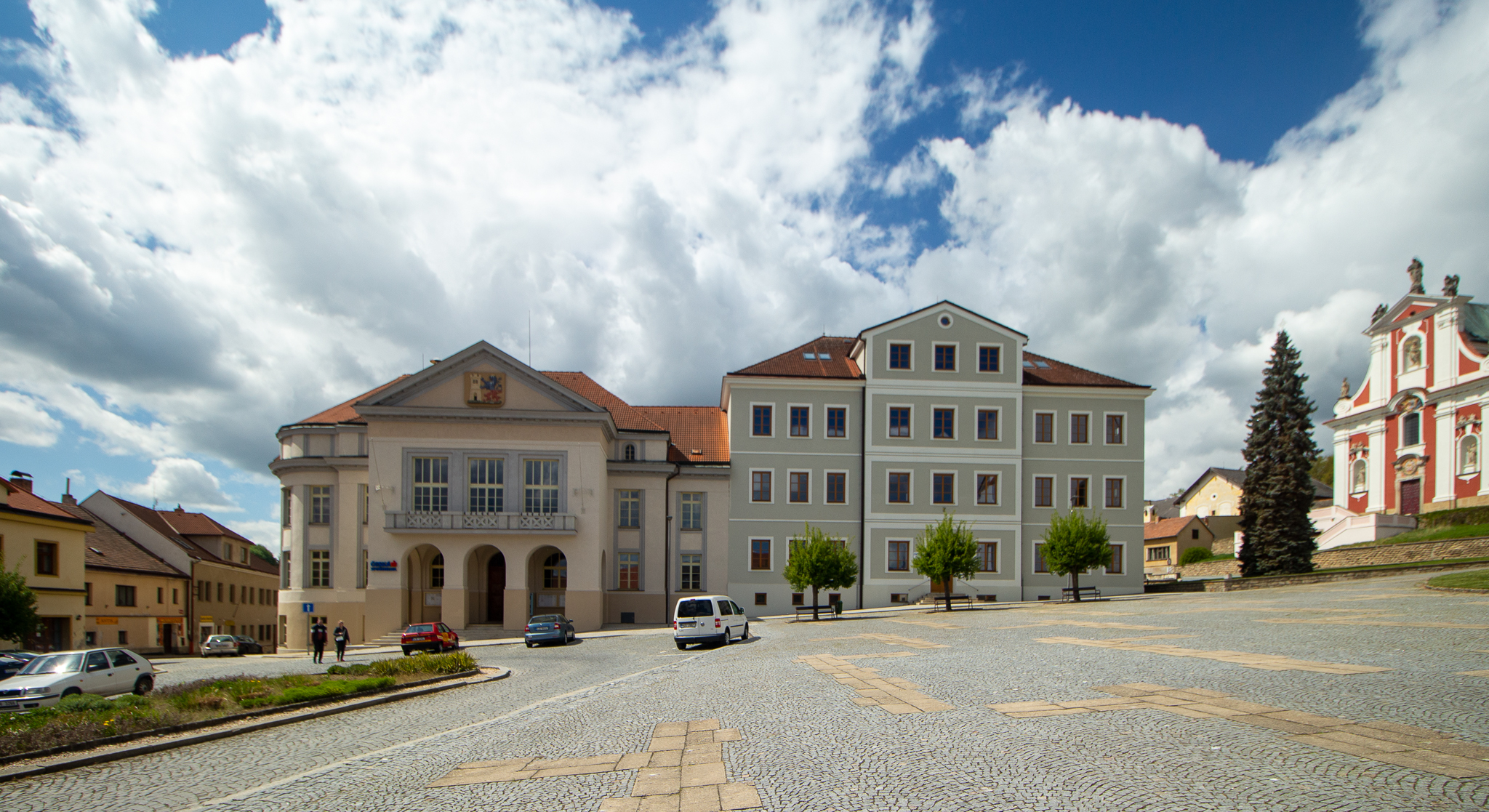
Town square with the former town hall

Pacov is located on the railway line Jihlava–Tábor.

== Sport ==
Since 1906, there is a historical motorcycle racecourse in Pacov. The first international race in Austria-Hungary (and the third world-wide) took place here. The Pacov Circuit is still being used to this day.

== Sights ==
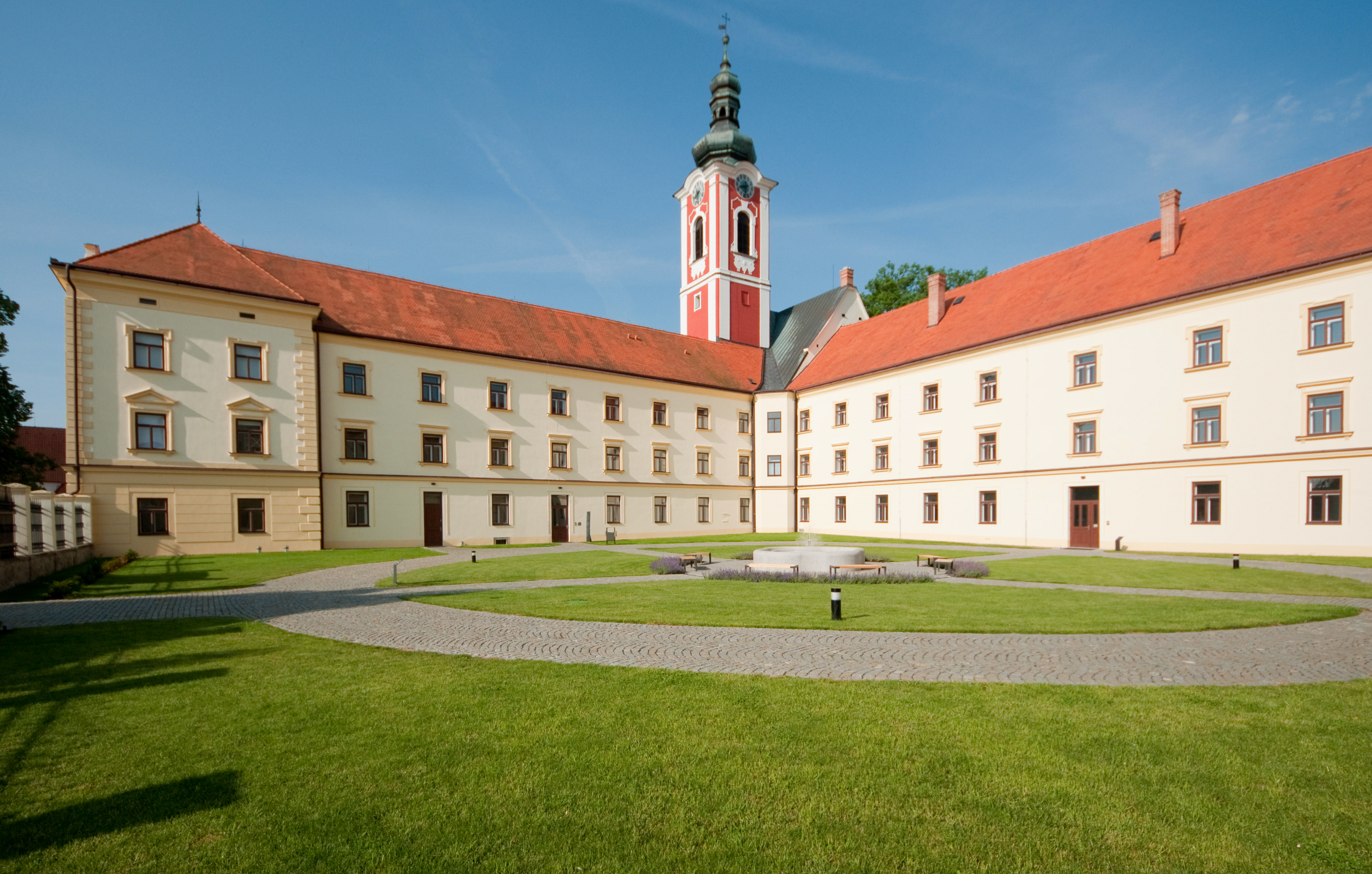
Castle courtyard

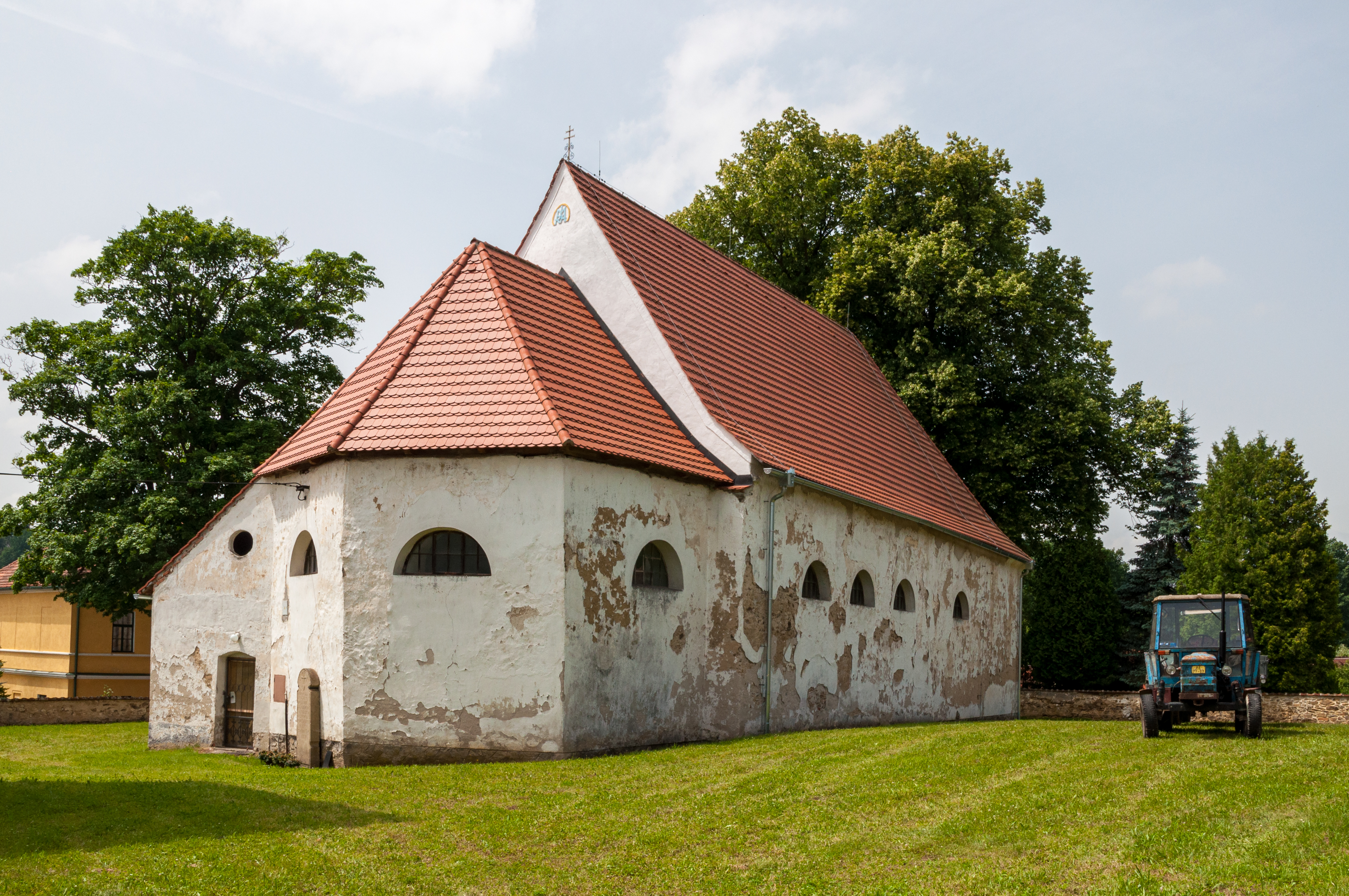
Church of the Assumption of the Virgin Mary in Zhoř

Pacov has preserved historic centre with several valuable houses, including the former town hall built in 1921–1923.

Pacov Castle was originally a Gothic castle from the 12th century, rebuilt into an aristocratic residence in the 16th century. In 1718, it was rebuilt into a monastery. After the monastery was abolished by the reform of Emperor Joseph II in 1787, it was rebuilt to a manor house again. Today it houses the municipal office, tourist information centre, library and Antonín Sova Town Museum. The castle complex includes a castle park with three fishponds.

The Church of Saint Michael the Archangel is a Gothic deanery church from the late 14th century. Despite several reconstructions and repairs, its appearance has been roughly preserved. The Church of Saint Wenceslaus is a Baroque building from 1719, originally built as the monastery church. After it was damaged by fire in 1727, it was reconstructed in 1732. Nowadays it serves as an art gallery.

The Jewish community is reminded by the Jewish cemetery and former synagogue. The cemetery was founded in 1680 and the oldest tombs are from the 18th century. The synagogue building is privately owned and closed to the public.

The village of Zhoř is protected as a village monument zone for its valuable preserved historical buildings with a high degree of urban preservation. The main landmark of Zhoř is the Church of the Assumption of the Virgin Mary.

== Notable people ==
- Antonín Sova (1864–1928), poet
- Jan Autengruber (1887–1920), painter
- Jiří Němec (born 1966), footballer
- Lukáš Vlček (born 1982), Czech politician and businessman; mayor of Pacov in 2006–2021

== Twin towns – sister cities ==
Pacov is twinned with:

- Arni, Switzerland

== See also ==
- Patzau, Wisconsin, named after Pacov
