= Furch Guitars =

Czech musical instrument maker

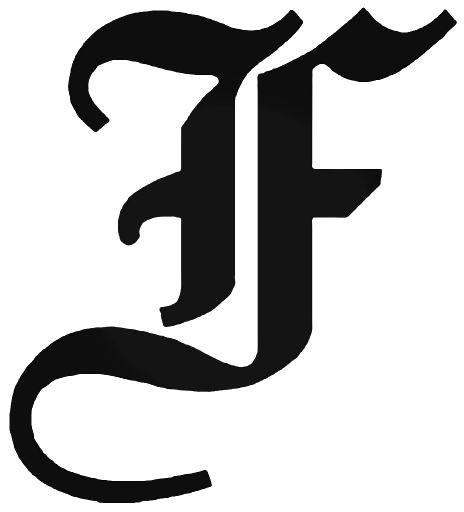
- Company type: Private
- Industry: Musical instruments
- Founded: 1981; 45 years ago
- Founder: František Furch
- Headquarters: Velké Němčice, Czech Republic
- Area served: Worldwide
- Products: Acoustic guitars, baritone guitars
- Revenue: 92,556,000 Czech koruna (2019)
- Operating income: −371,000 Czech koruna (2019)
- Net income: −393,000 Czech koruna (2019)
- Total assets: 52,606,000 Czech koruna (2019)
- Number of employees: 74 (2019)
- Website: furchguitars.com

Furch Guitars is a Czech manufacturer of premium acoustic guitars founded in 1981 by František Furch. Furch guitars are claimed to be used by such artists as Al di Meola, Suzanne Vega, Per Gessle, Glen Hansard, and Calum Graham.

The company's production complex and head office are located in Velké Němčice, Czech Republic. In 2019, Furch Guitars opened their distribution and servicing center in Nashville, Tennessee, USA.

== Models ==
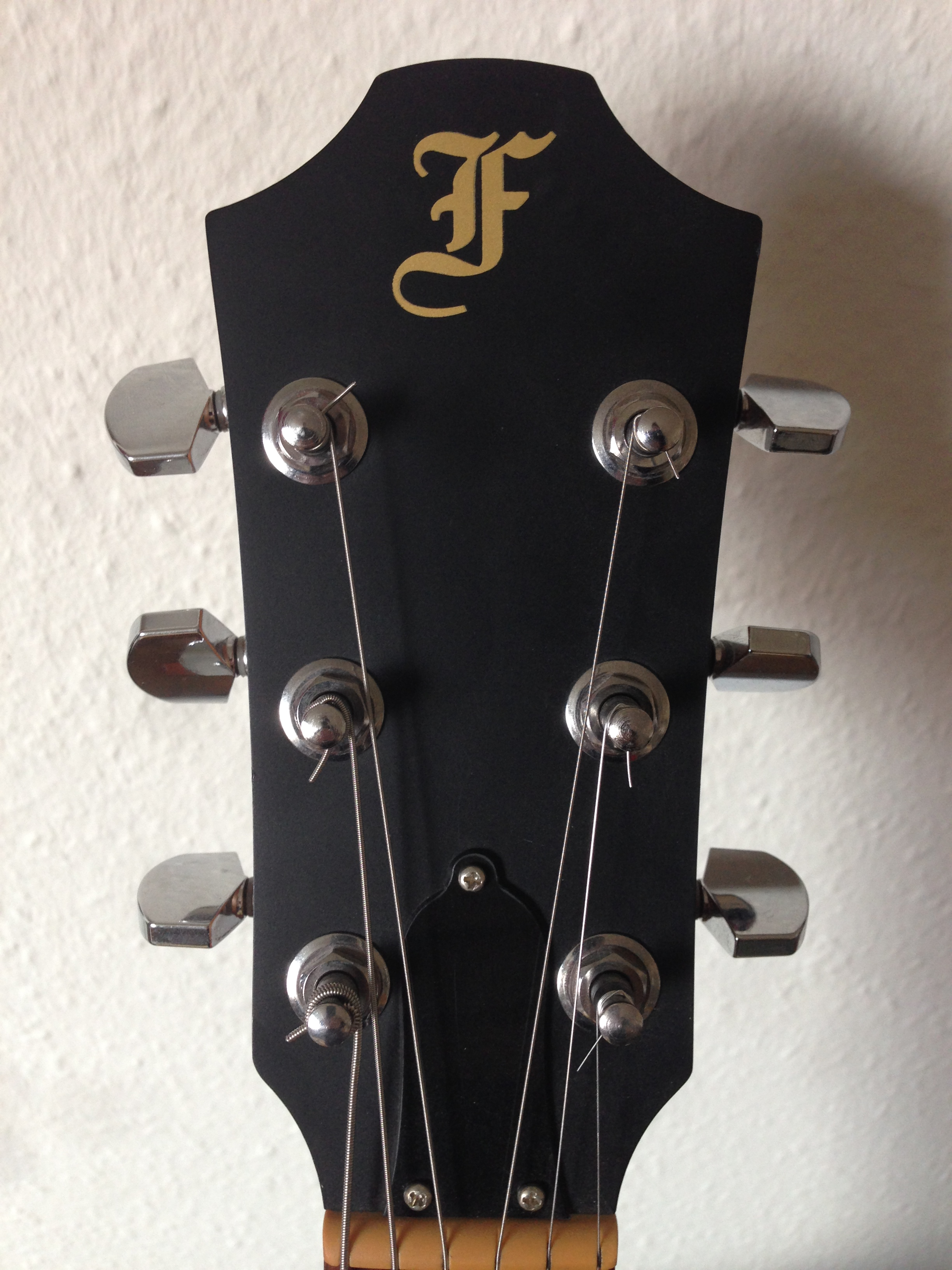
Headstock of a Furch A17-40 CM guitar, with the classic "F" monogram

The core of Furch Guitars' portfolio is their six color series: Red, Orange, Yellow, Green, Blue and Violet. Each of these series is defined primarily by the grade of tonewoods, finish, and appointments.

The flagships of these six series are called Master's Choice. Unlike the standard color models, Master's Choice instruments are made to set specifications, such as the body shape, top and back tonewoods, and fingerboard width. Furch relied on both the master luthier's and the master musician's perspectives in determining these specifications.

Other guitar models include vintage guitars, grand nylon guitars and traveling guitar Little Jane
