= Lokavec =

Lokavec is the name of a few settlements in Slovenia:

- Lokavec, Ajdovščina, in the Municipality of Ajdovščina
- Lokavec, Laško, in the Municipality of Laško
- Lokavec, Sveta Ana, in the Municipality of Sveta Ana

== See also ==
- Lokovec
- Lukavec (disambiguation)
