= Lukavice, Sanski Most =

Lukavice
- Village
- Location within Bosnia and Herzegovina
- Coordinates: 44.822003°N 16.486442°E
- Country: Bosnia and Herzegovina
- Entity: Federation of Bosnia and Herzegovina
- Canton: Una-Sana
- Municipality: Sanski Most

Area
  - Total: 4.01 sq mi (10.39 km^{2})

Population (2013)
  - Total: 486
  - Density: 121/sq mi (46.8/km^{2})
- Time zone: UTC+1 (CET)
  - Summer (DST): UTC+2 (CEST)

Lukavice is a village in the municipality of Sanski Most, Federation of Bosnia and Herzegovina, Bosnia and Herzegovina.

== Demographics ==
According to the 2013 census, its population was 486.

Ethnicity in 2013
Ethnicity	Number	Percentage
Bosniaks	473	97.3%
Serbs	8	1.6%
Croats	1	0.2%
other/undeclared	4	0.8%
Total	486	100%
