= Lukavice (Rychnov nad Kněžnou District) =

- Municipality
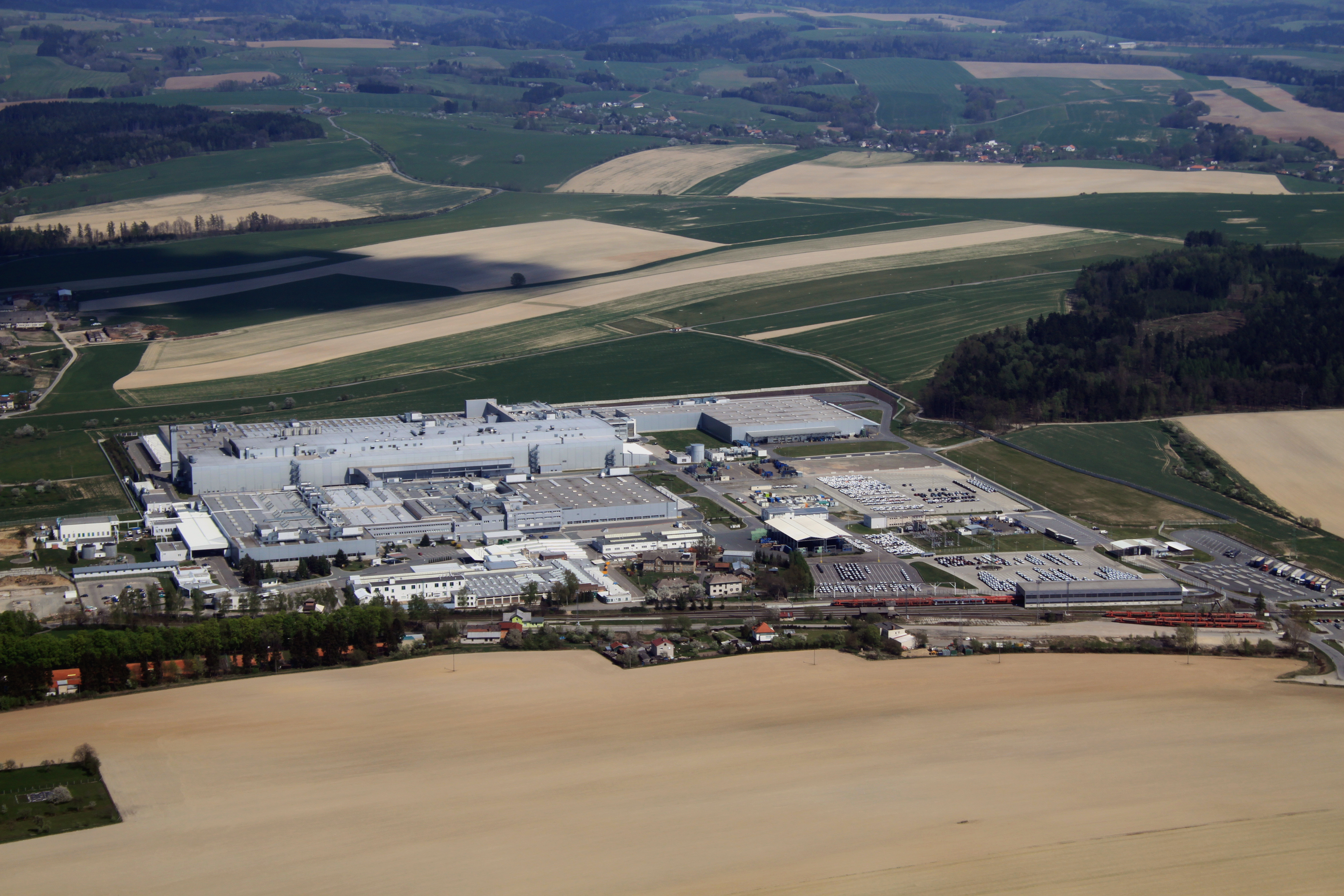
- Škoda Auto factory in Kvasiny, Lukavice in the background

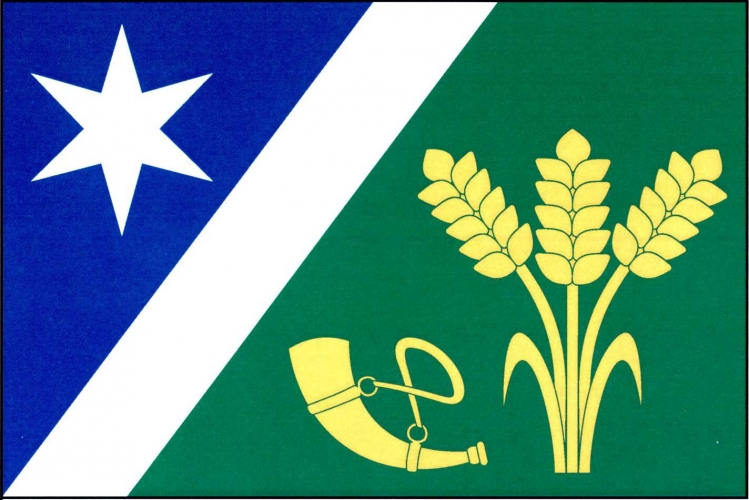
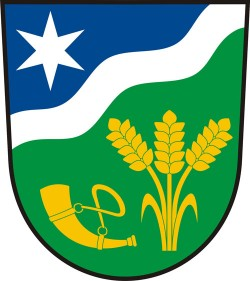
- Flag Coat of arms

- Location in the Czech Republic
- Coordinates: 50°12′0″N 16°17′37″E
- Country: Czech Republic
- Region: Hradec Králové
- District: Rychnov nad Kněžnou
- First mentioned: 1364

Area
  - Total: 10.92 km^{2} (4.22 sq mi)
- Elevation: 470 m (1,540 ft)

Population (2026-01-01)
  - Total: 640
  - Density: 59/km^{2} (150/sq mi)
- Time zone: UTC+1 (CET)
  - Summer (DST): UTC+2 (CEST)
- Postal code: 516 03
- Website: www.lukavice.cz

Lukavice is a municipality and village in Rychnov nad Kněžnou District in the Hradec Králové Region of the Czech Republic. It has about 600 inhabitants.

== Demographics ==
Historical population
Year	Pop.	±%
1869	1,170	—
1880	1,096	−6.3%
1890	1,115	+1.7%
1900	1,097	−1.6%
1910	1,050	−4.3%
1921	971	−7.5%
1930	897	−7.6%
1950	659	−26.5%
1961	622	−5.6%
1970	609	−2.1%
1980	524	−14.0%
1991	471	−10.1%
2001	518	+10.0%
2011	601	+16.0%
2021	613	+2.0%
Source: Censuses
