= Velké Němčice =

- Market town
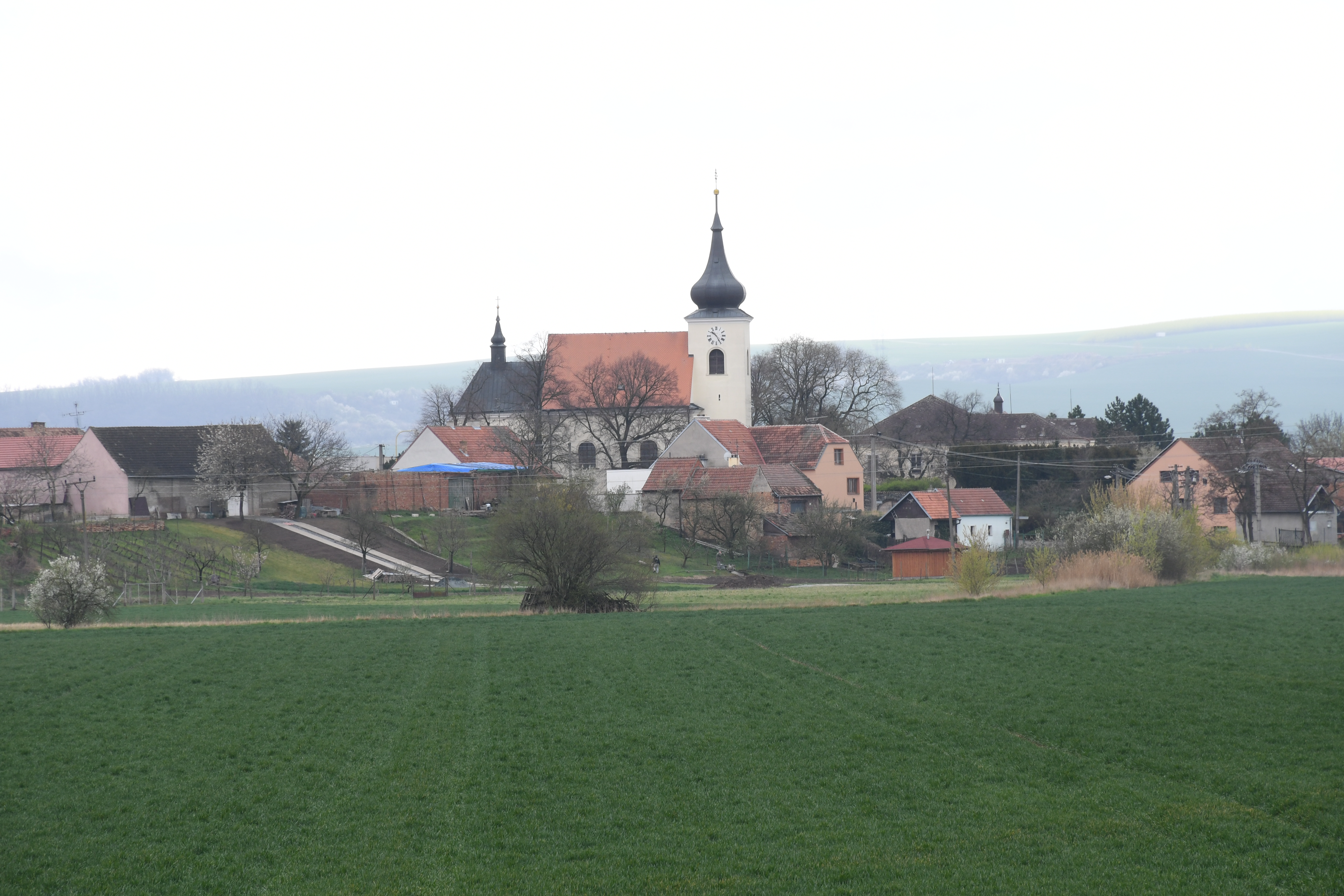
- View from the north

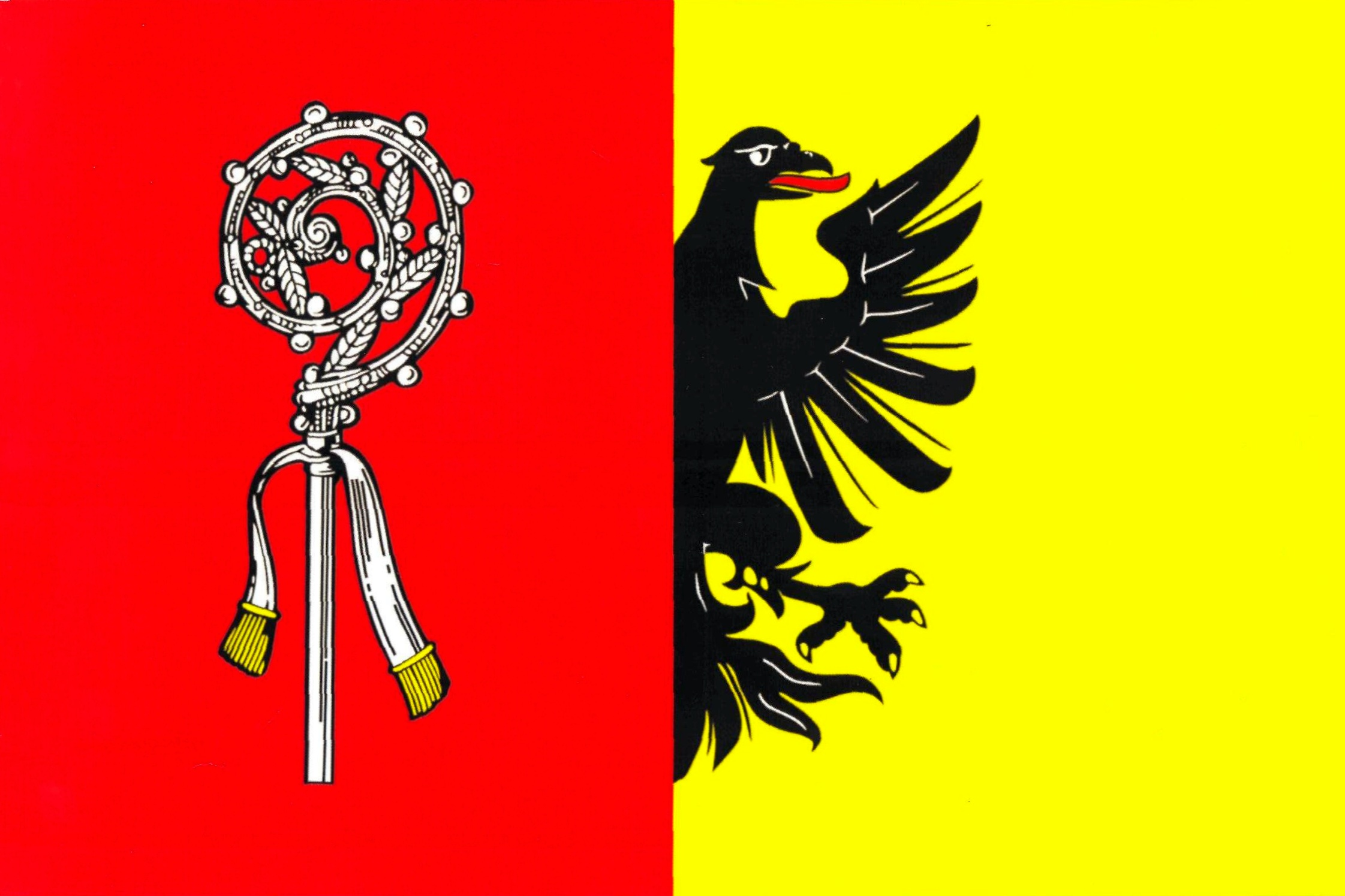
- Flag Coat of arms

- Location in the Czech Republic
- Coordinates: 48°59′30″N 16°40′20″E
- Country: Czech Republic
- Region: South Moravian
- District: Břeclav
- First mentioned: 1228

Area
  - Total: 21.97 km^{2} (8.48 sq mi)
- Elevation: 180 m (590 ft)

Population (2026-01-01)
  - Total: 1,886
  - Density: 85.84/km^{2} (222.3/sq mi)
- Time zone: UTC+1 (CET)
  - Summer (DST): UTC+2 (CEST)
- Postal code: 691 63
- Website: www.velkenemcice.cz

Velké Němčice (Czech pronunciation: [ˈvɛlkɛː ˈɲɛmtʃɪtsɛ]; German: Groß Niemtschitz) is a market town in Břeclav District in the South Moravian Region of the Czech Republic. It has about 1,900 inhabitants.

== Geography ==
Velké Němčice is located about 30 kilometres (19 mi) northwest of Břeclav and 22 km (14 mi) south of Brno. Most of the municipal territory lies in the Dyje–Svratka Valley, but it also extends into the Ždánice Forest range in the east and to the Lower Morava Valley in the south. The highest point is at 337 m (1,106 ft) above sea level. The market town is situated on the left bank of the Svratka River.

== History ==
The first written mention of Velké Němčice is in a deed of King Ottokar I from 1228. Until 1550, the village was owned by the monastery in Velehrad, but in 1423–1550, the monastery rented the village to various nobles, including Vilém II of Pernštejn. In 1549, Velké Němčice was promoted to a market town. In 1562, Emperor Ferdinand I promoted Velké Němčice to a town with the condition of building town walls, but they were not built, so Velké Němčice remained just a market town.

Approximately in the years 1528–1600, the community of Anabaptists lived here. Velké Němčice was badly damaged during the Bocskai uprising in 1605 and during the Thirty Years' War. Further suffering followed in 1705 during the Rákóczi's War of Independence. In 1726, a large fire damaged the market town. In 1774, Velké Němčice was bought by the Dietrichstein family and annexed to the Židlochovice estate, which remained so until the establishment of an independent municipality in 1848.

== Demographics ==
Historical population

Year	Pop.	±%
1869	1,557	—
1880	1,568	+0.7%
1890	1,578	+0.6%
1900	1,489	−5.6%
1910	1,561	+4.8%

Year	Pop.	±%
1921	1,509	−3.3%
1930	1,531	+1.5%
1950	1,431	−6.5%
1961	1,511	+5.6%
1970	1,524	+0.9%

Year	Pop.	±%
1980	1,555	+2.0%
1991	1,624	+4.4%
2001	1,651	+1.7%
2011	1,752	+6.1%
2021	1,748	−0.2%

Source: Censuses

== Transport ==
The D2 motorway (part of the European route E65) from Brno to the Czech–Slovak border in Lanžhot runs through the municipal territory.

== Sights ==
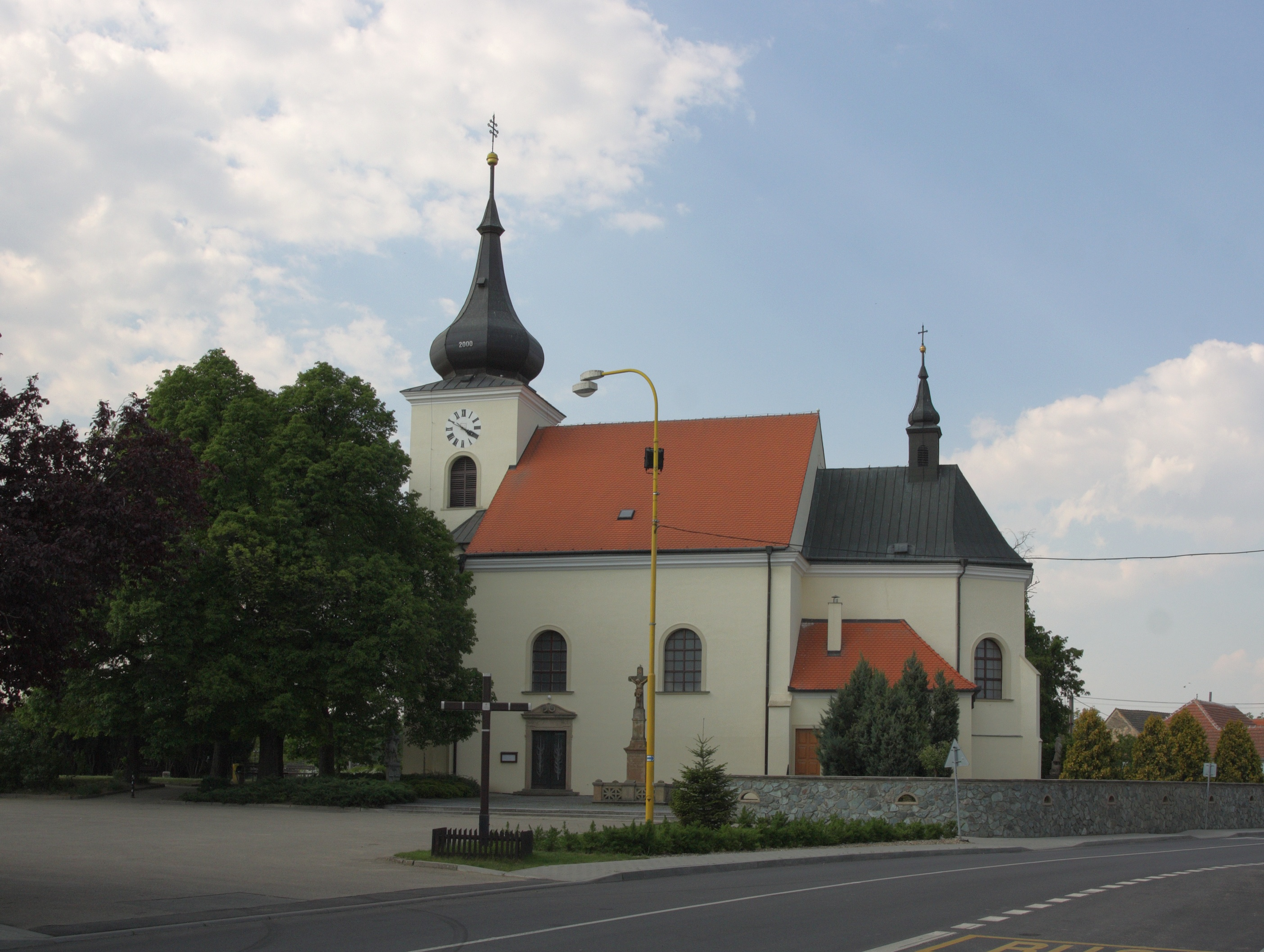
Church of Saints Wenceslaus and Vitus

The main landmark of Velké Němčice is the Church of Saints Wenceslaus and Vitus. It was originally a Gothic church with a Romanesque core, but it was destroyed during the Thirty Years' War. Before 1652, it was completely rebuilt in the late Renaissance style, which is unique for the region.
