= Lukavec u Hořic =

- Municipality
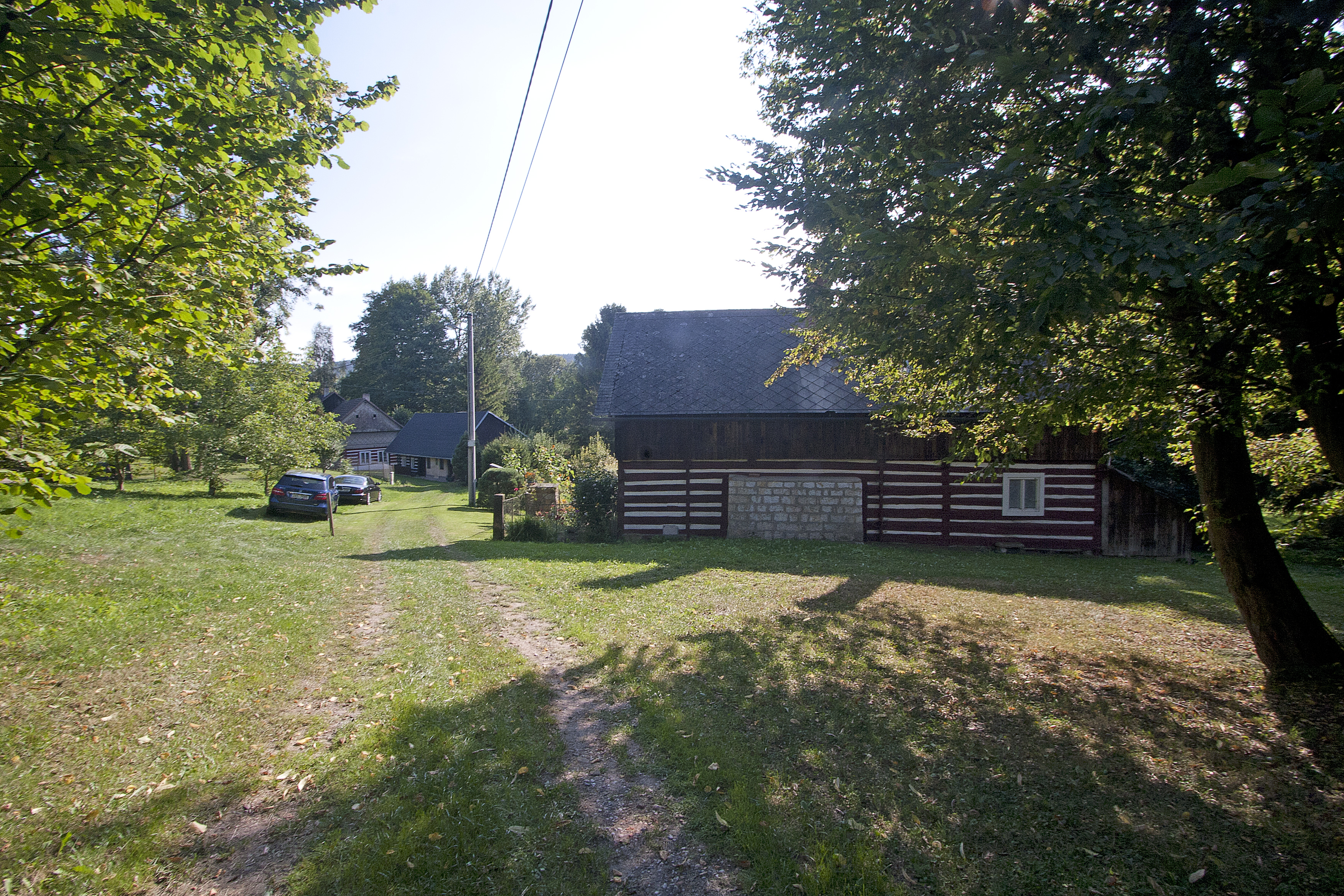
- Černín, a part of Lukavec u Hořic

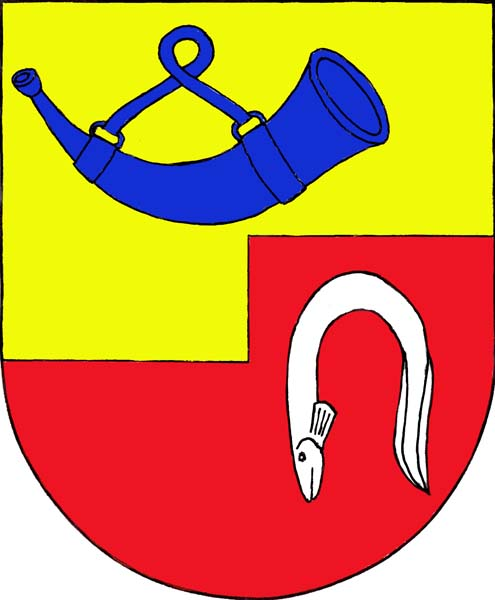
- Flag Coat of arms

- Location in the Czech Republic
- Coordinates: 50°23′45″N 15°37′1″E
- Country: Czech Republic
- Region: Hradec Králové
- District: Jičín
- First mentioned: 1440

Area
  - Total: 8.66 km^{2} (3.34 sq mi)
- Elevation: 309 m (1,014 ft)

Population (2026-01-01)
  - Total: 330
  - Density: 38/km^{2} (99/sq mi)
- Time zone: UTC+1 (CET)
  - Summer (DST): UTC+2 (CEST)
- Postal code: 508 01
- Website: www.lukavec.eu

Lukavec u Hořic is a municipality and village in Jičín District in the Hradec Králové Region of the Czech Republic. It has about 300 inhabitants.

== Administrative division ==
Lukavec u Hořic consists of three municipal parts (in brackets population according to the 2021 census):

- Lukavec u Hořic (259)
- Černín (18)
- Dobeš (31)

== Demographics ==
Historical population
Year	Pop.	±%
1869	915	—
1880	854	−6.7%
1890	840	−1.6%
1900	818	−2.6%
1910	742	−9.3%
1921	649	−12.5%
1930	613	−5.5%
1950	425	−30.7%
1961	366	−13.9%
1970	302	−17.5%
1980	267	−11.6%
1991	271	+1.5%
2001	251	−7.4%
2011	265	+5.6%
2021	308	+16.2%
Source: Censuses
