= Lukavica, Bardejov District =

Lukavica
- Municipality
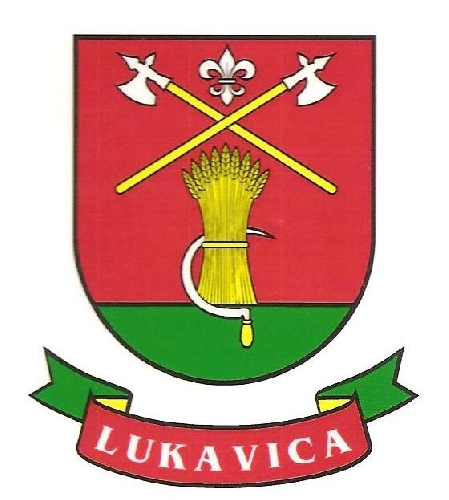
- Flag Coat of arms

- Location of Lukavica in the Prešov Region Location of Lukavica in Slovakia
- Coordinates: 49.26°N 21.32°E
- Country: Slovakia
- Region: Prešov Region
- District: Bardejov District
- First mentioned: 1389

Area
  - Total: 8.29 km^{2} (3.20 sq mi)
- Elevation: 358 m (1,175 ft)

Population (2025)
  - Total: 370
- Time zone: UTC+1 (CET)
  - Summer (DST): UTC+2 (CEST)
- Postal code: 862 1
- Area code: +421 54
- Vehicle registration plate (until 2022): BJ
- Website: obeclukavica.sk

Lukavica is a village and municipality of the Bardejov District in the Prešov Region of Slovakia.

== Population ==
Population statistic (10 years)
Year	1995	2005	2015	2025
Count	393	384	383	370
Difference		−2.29%	−0.26%	−3.39%

Population statistic
Year	2024	2025
Count	371	370
Difference		−0.26%

It has a population of 370 people (31 December 2025).

=== Ethnicity ===
Census 2021 (1+ %)
Ethnicity	Number	Fraction
Slovak	372	99.46%
Rusyn	13	3.47%
Not found out	4	1.06%
Total	374	

In year 2021 was 374 people by ethnicity 372 as Slovak, 13 as Rusyn, 4 as Not found out and 2 as German.

Note on population: The difference values of population numbers in the table "Population statistic" and in the sections "Ethnicity" & "Religion" is caused by the use of various statistical methods.

=== Religion ===
Census 2021 (1+ %)
Religion	Number	Fraction
Evangelical Church	293	78.34%
Roman Catholic Church	34	9.09%
Greek Catholic Church	25	6.68%
None	12	3.21%
Other and not ascertained christian church	5	1.34%
Total	374	

In year 2021 was 374 people by religion 293 from Evangelical Church, 34 from Roman Catholic Church, 25 from Greek Catholic Church, 12 from None, 5 from Other and not ascertained christian church, 2 from Not found out, 2 from Other and 1 from Eastern Orthodox Church.
