= Lukavice (Ústí nad Orlicí District) =

- Municipality
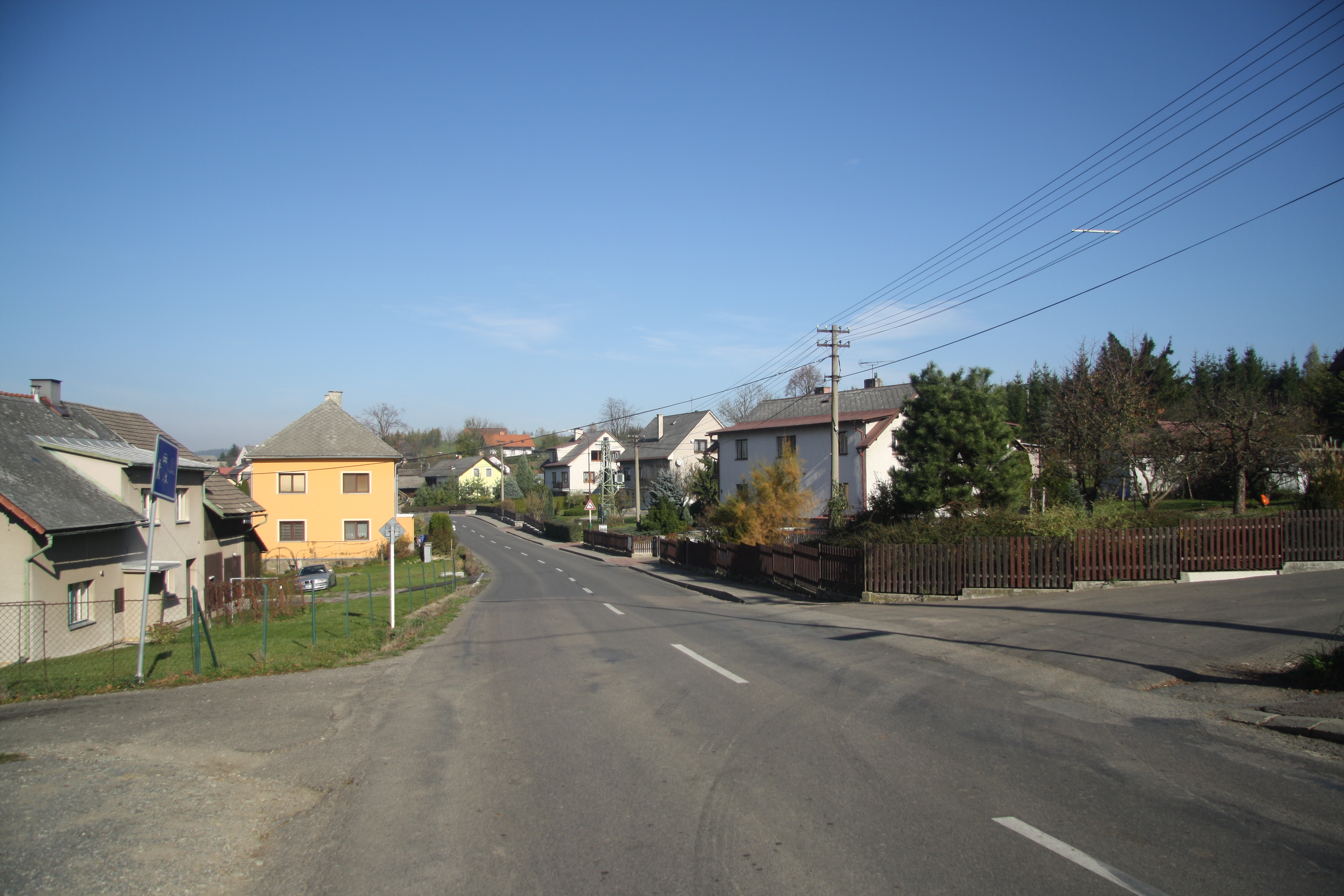
- Centre of Lukavice

- Flag Coat of arms

- Location in the Czech Republic
- Coordinates: 50°3′37″N 16°28′56″E
- Country: Czech Republic
- Region: Pardubice
- District: Ústí nad Orlicí
- First mentioned: 1354

Area
  - Total: 11.04 km^{2} (4.26 sq mi)
- Elevation: 380 m (1,250 ft)

Population (2026-01-01)
  - Total: 1,227
  - Density: 111.1/km^{2} (287.9/sq mi)
- Time zone: UTC+1 (CET)
  - Summer (DST): UTC+2 (CEST)
- Postal code: 561 51
- Website: www.obeclukavice.cz

Lukavice (German: Lukawice) is a municipality and village in Ústí nad Orlicí District in the Pardubice Region of the Czech Republic. It has about 1,200 inhabitants.

Lukavice lies approximately 12 kilometres (7 mi) north-east of Ústí nad Orlicí, 51 km (32 mi) east of Pardubice, and 148 km (92 mi) east of Prague.

== Demographics ==
Historical population
| Year | Pop. | ±% |
|---|---|---|
| 1869 | 1,184 | — |
| 1880 | 1,179 | −0.4% |
| 1890 | 1,168 | −0.9% |
| 1900 | 1,074 | −8.0% |
| 1910 | 1,127 | +4.9% |
| 1921 | 1,114 | −1.2% |
| 1930 | 1,006 | −9.7% |
| 1950 | 857 | −14.8% |
| 1961 | 817 | −4.7% |
| 1970 | 833 | +2.0% |
| 1980 | 906 | +8.8% |
| 1991 | 952 | +5.1% |
| 2001 | 1,042 | +9.5% |
| 2011 | 1,102 | +5.8% |
| 2021 | 1,153 | +4.6% |
Source: Censuses
