= Horní Lukavice =

- Municipality
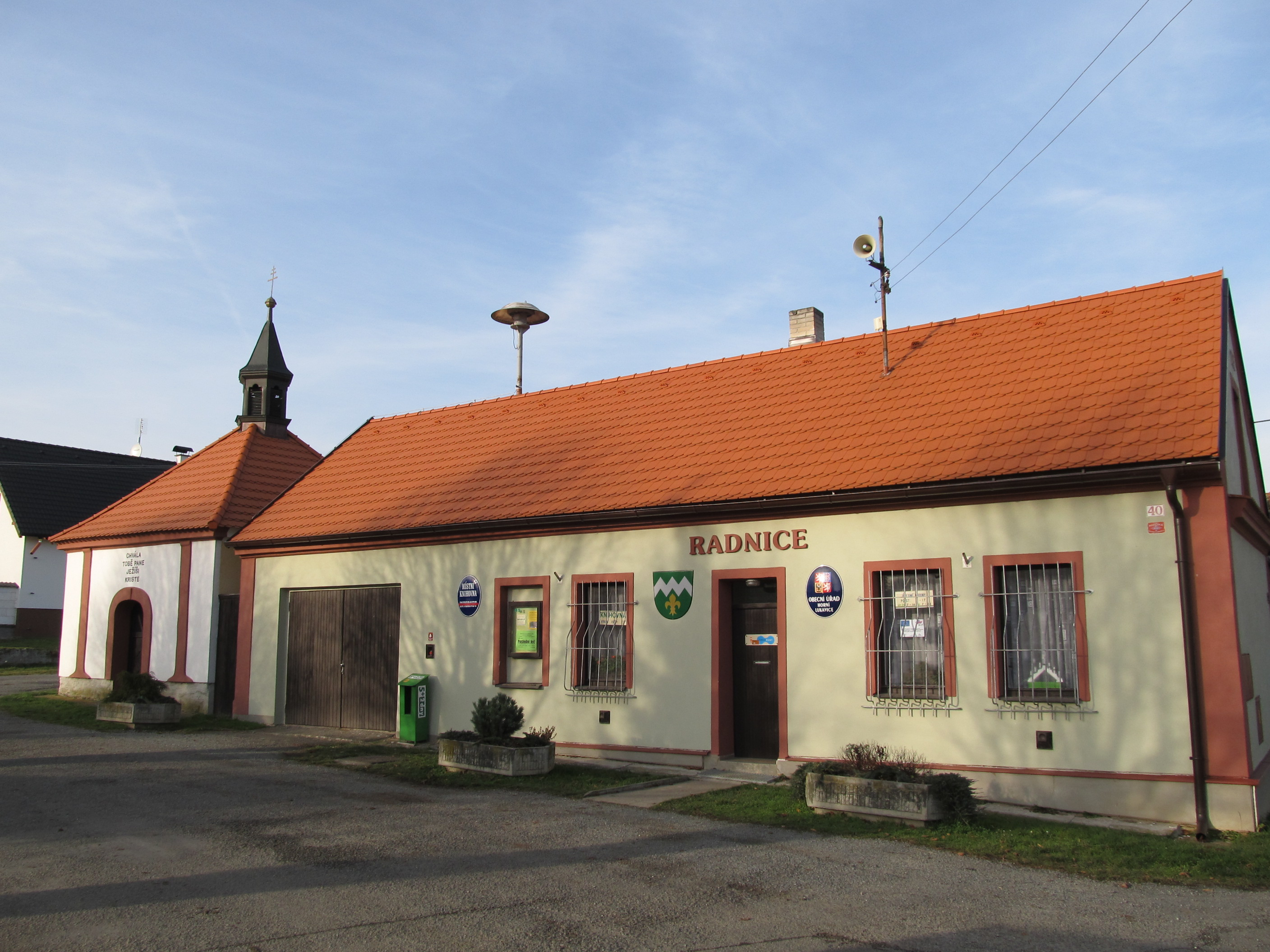
- Municipal office with the chapel

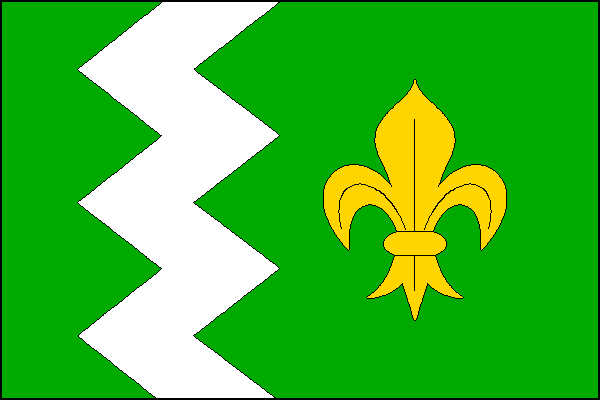
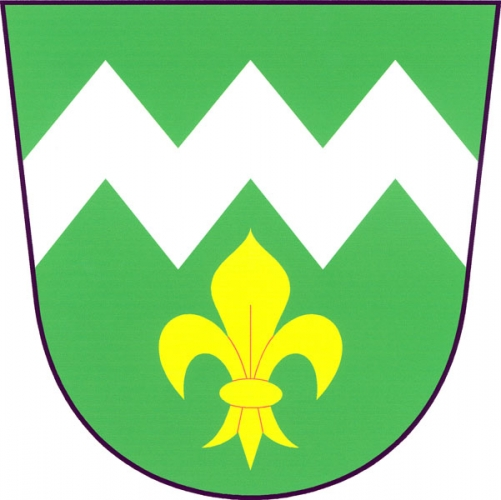
- Flag Coat of arms

- Location in the Czech Republic
- Coordinates: 49°36′45″N 13°19′37″E
- Country: Czech Republic
- Region: Plzeň
- District: Plzeň-South
- First mentioned: 1216

Area
  - Total: 7.32 km^{2} (2.83 sq mi)
- Elevation: 373 m (1,224 ft)

Population (2026-01-01)
  - Total: 507
  - Density: 69.3/km^{2} (179/sq mi)
- Time zone: UTC+1 (CET)
  - Summer (DST): UTC+2 (CEST)
- Postal code: 334 01
- Website: www.horni-lukavice.cz

Horní Lukavice is a municipality and village in Plzeň-South District in the Plzeň Region of the Czech Republic. It has about 500 inhabitants.

Horní Lukavice lies approximately 16 kilometres (10 mi) south of Plzeň and 95 km (59 mi) south-west of Prague.

== Demographics ==
Historical population
Year	Pop.	±%
1869	483	—
1880	479	−0.8%
1890	499	+4.2%
1900	518	+3.8%
1910	579	+11.8%
1921	594	+2.6%
1930	630	+6.1%
1950	540	−14.3%
1961	528	−2.2%
1970	467	−11.6%
1980	412	−11.8%
1991	383	−7.0%
2001	348	−9.1%
2011	378	+8.6%
2021	461	+22.0%
Source: Censuses
