= Lukavec (Pelhřimov District) =

- Market town
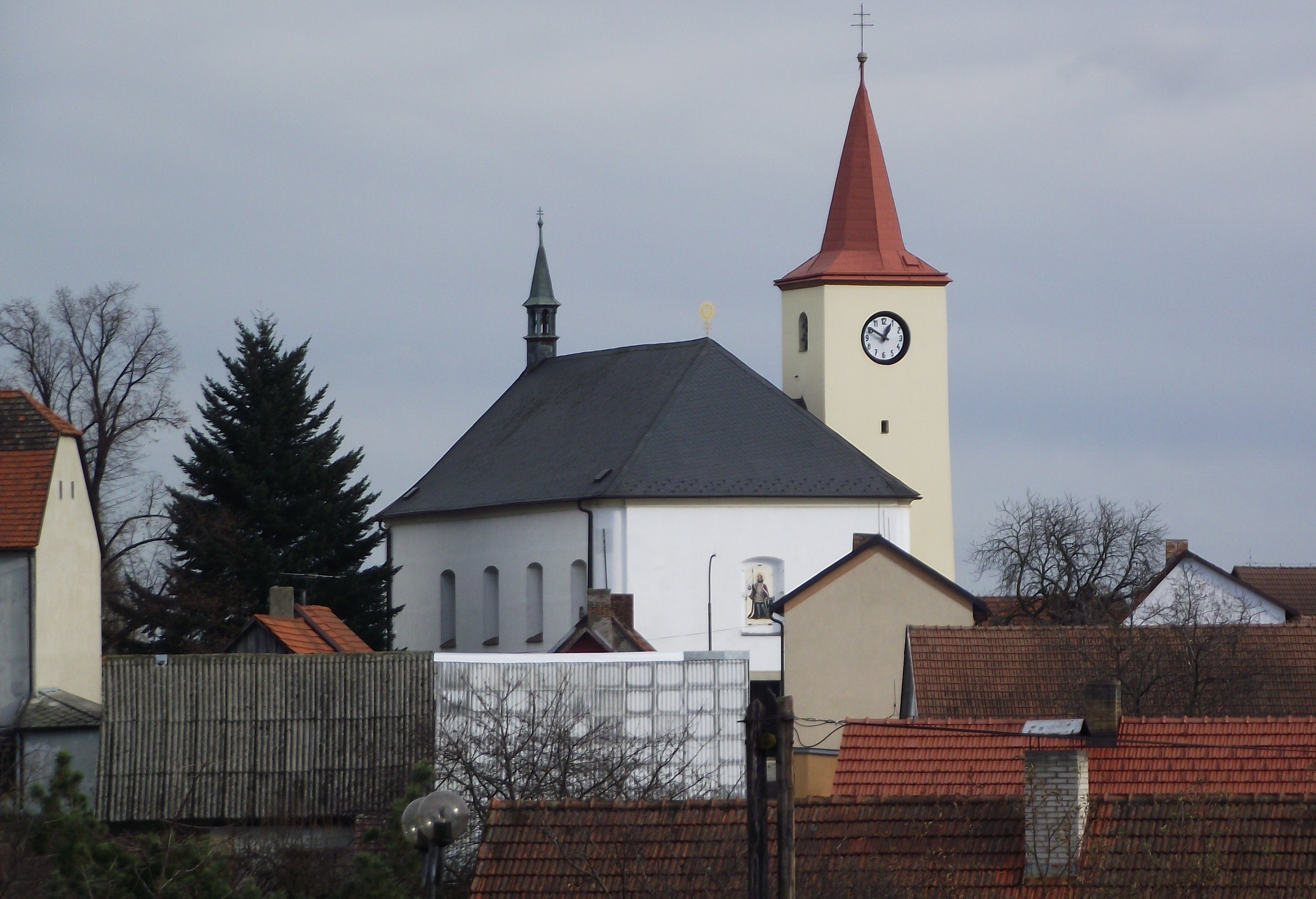
- Church of Saint Wenceslaus

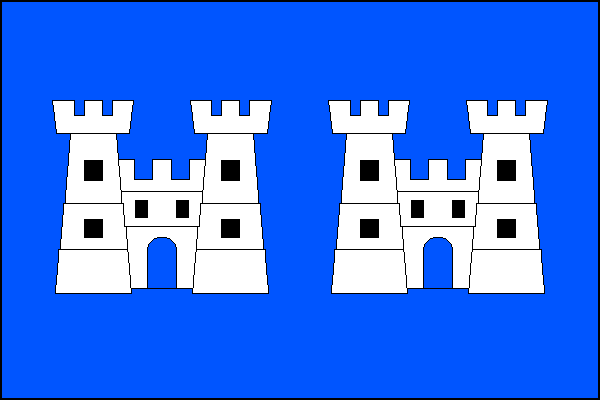
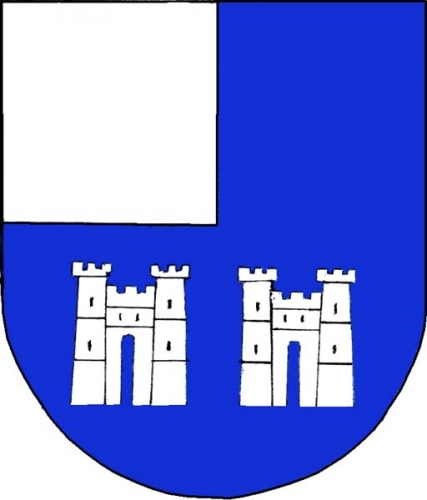
- Flag Coat of arms

- Location in the Czech Republic
- Coordinates: 49°33′56″N 14°59′26″E
- Country: Czech Republic
- Region: Vysočina
- District: Pelhřimov
- First mentioned: 1352

Area
  - Total: 21.48 km^{2} (8.29 sq mi)
- Elevation: 579 m (1,900 ft)

Population (2026-01-01)
  - Total: 965
  - Density: 44.9/km^{2} (116/sq mi)
- Time zone: UTC+1 (CET)
  - Summer (DST): UTC+2 (CEST)
- Postal codes: 394 26, 395 01
- Website: www.lukavec.cz

Lukavec (Czech pronunciation: [ˈlukavɛts]) is a market town in Pelhřimov District in the Vysočina Region of the Czech Republic. It has about 1,000 inhabitants.

== Administrative division ==
Lukavec consists of four municipal parts (in brackets population according to the 2021 census):

- Lukavec (840)
- Bezděkov (32)
- Týmova Ves (44)
- Velká Ves (23)

== Etymology ==
The name is derived from the old Czech adjective lukavý, i.e. 'meadow'.

== Geography ==
Lukavec is located about 22 kilometres (14 mi) northwest of Pelhřimov and 63 km (39 mi) southeast of Prague. It lies in the Křemešník Highlands. The highest point is at 697 m (2,287 ft) above sea level. There are several small fishponds around the market town.

== History ==
The first written mention of Lukavec is from 1352, when there was a fortress owned by the Lukavecký of Lukavec family. The family owned Lukavec until the early 17th century, then the owners often changed. In 1543, Lukavec was first referred to as a market town.

== Demographics ==
Historical population

Year	Pop.	±%
1869	1,673	—
1880	1,694	+1.3%
1890	1,654	−2.4%
1900	1,460	−11.7%
1910	1,426	−2.3%

Year	Pop.	±%
1921	1,381	−3.2%
1930	1,293	−6.4%
1950	1,040	−19.6%
1961	1,009	−3.0%
1970	990	−1.9%

Year	Pop.	±%
1980	1,129	+14.0%
1991	1,147	+1.6%
2001	1,137	−0.9%
2011	1,041	−8.4%
2021	939	−9.8%

Source: Censuses

== Transport ==
There are no railways or major roads passing through the municipal territory.

== Sights ==
The main landmark of the town square is the Church of Saint Wenceslaus. It was built in the late Baroque style in 1774-1781 on the site of a chapel, which was first documented in 1654. The tower was preserved from the original chapel. The present appearance of the church is a result of modifications made after the fire in 1856.

The Lukavec Castle is a late Renaissance building, built on the site of an older Gothic fortress. It is surrounded with a large English park with ponds and a Neoclassical pavilion. Today, the pavilion houses an exhibition about the poet Antonín Sova, who grew up here.

In the northern part of Lukavec is a significant Jewish cemetery. Its existence was first documented in 1724 and was used until 1935. The oldest preserved tombstone is from 1725. It has an area of 0.16 ha (0.40 acres).

== Notable people ==
- Antonín Sova (1864–1928), poet; grew up here
