= Čížkov =

Čížkov may refer to places in the Czech Republic:

- Čížkov (Pelhřimov District), a municipality and village in the Vysočina Region
- Čížkov (Plzeň-South District), a municipality and village in the Plzeň Region
