= Spa town =

Specialized resort town situated around a mineral spa

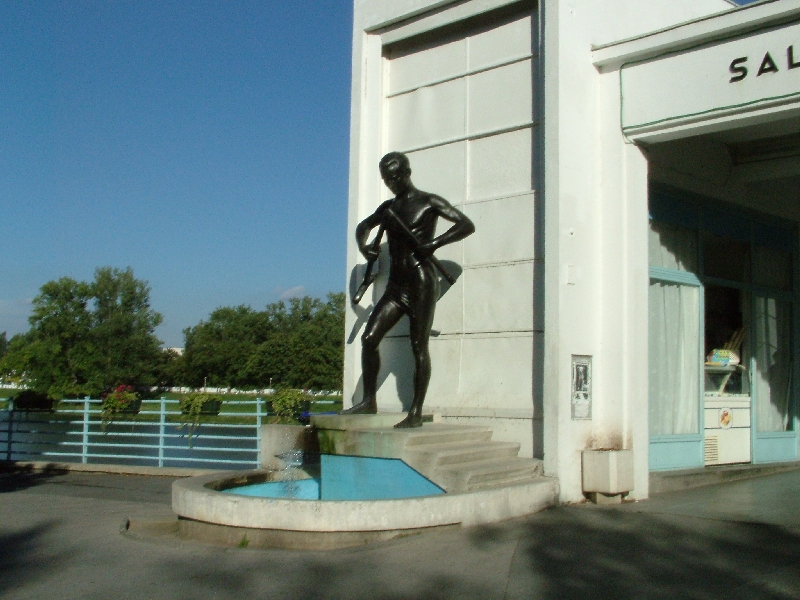
The statue of "The crutchbreaker" in the spa town Piešťany (Slovakia) – a symbol of balneotherapy

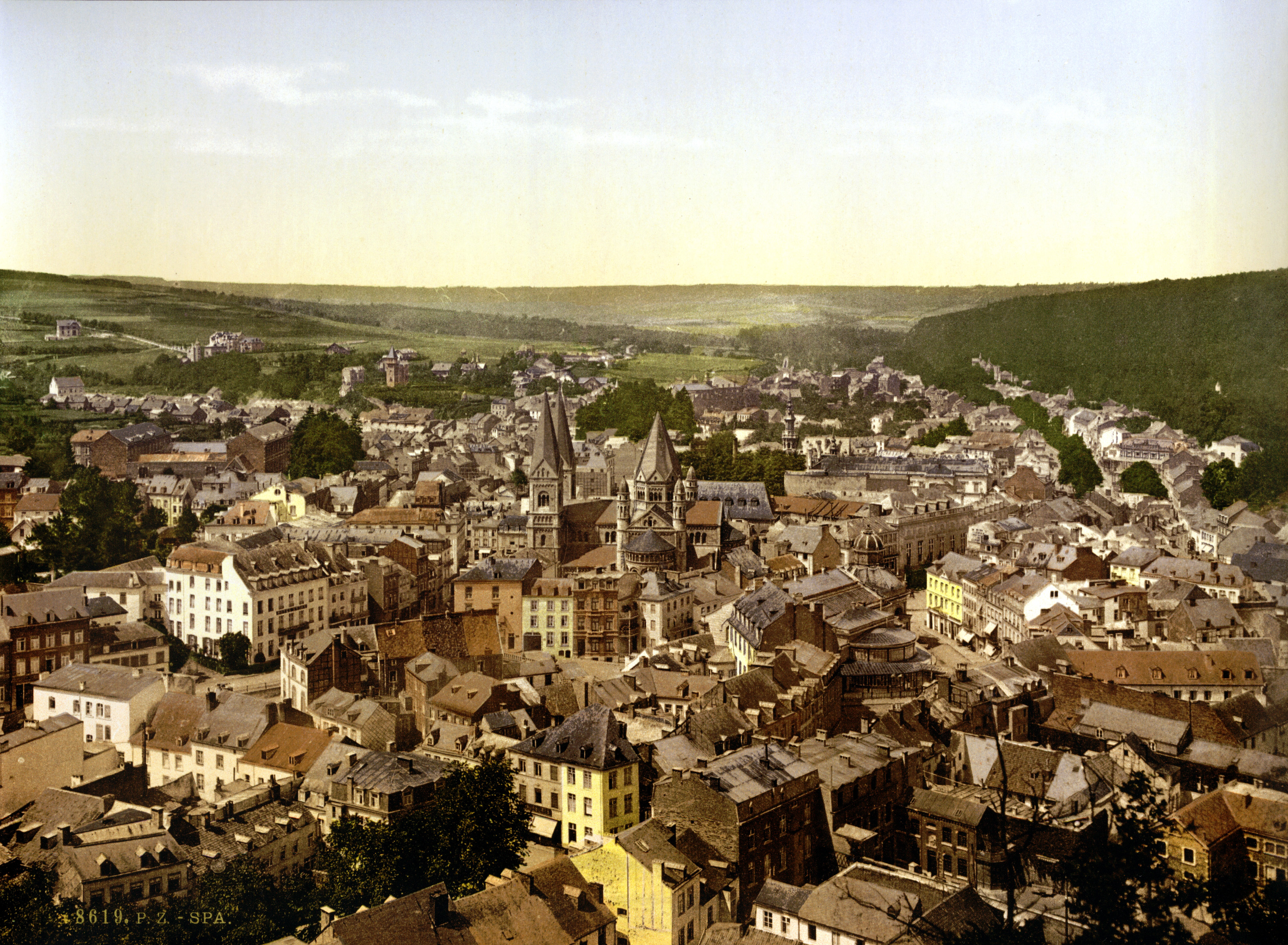
Print of Spa, Belgium, 1895

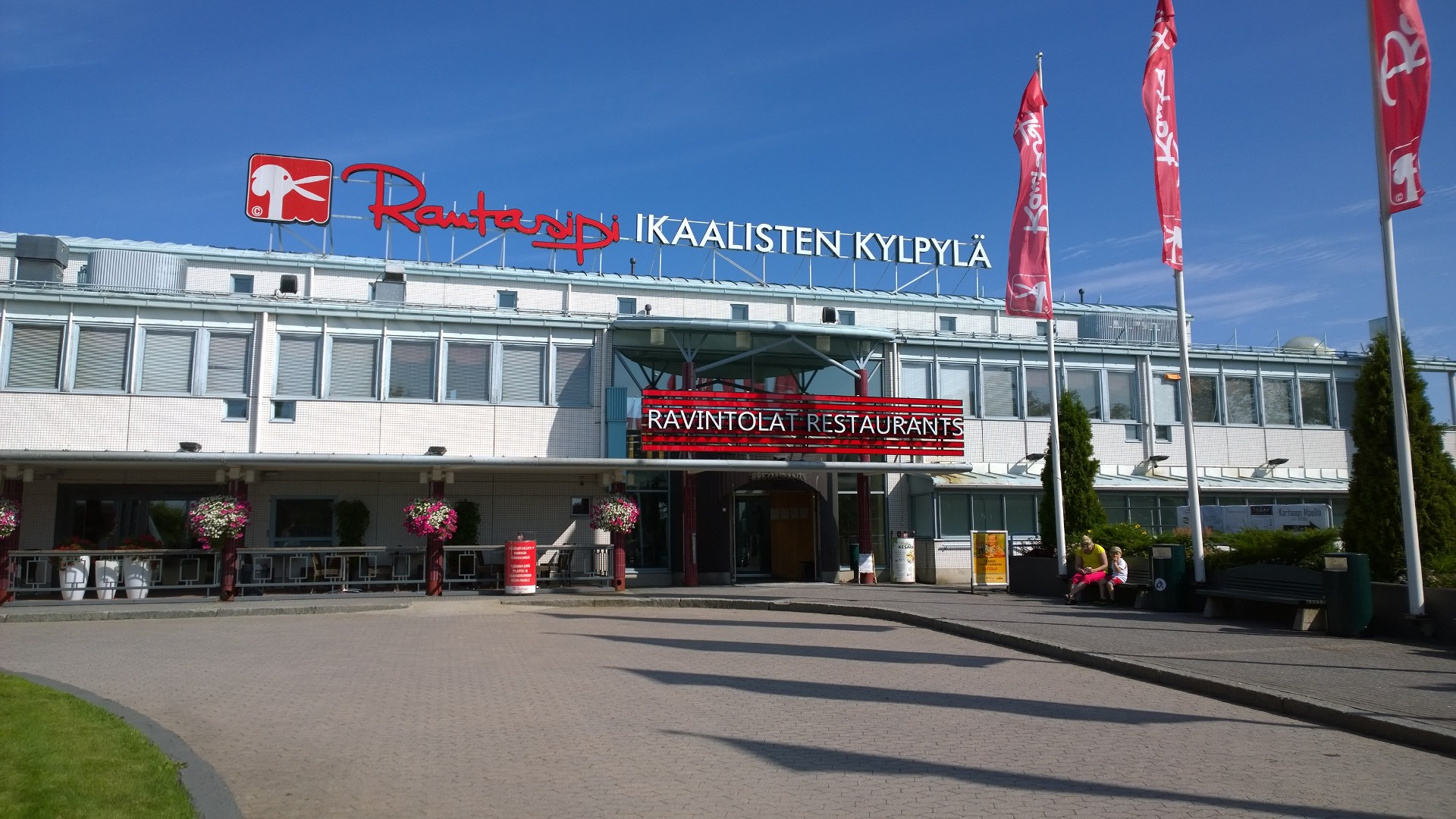
Ikaalisten Kylpylä, a spa center in Ikaalinen, Pirkanmaa, Finland

A spa town is a resort town based on a mineral spa (a developed mineral spring). Patrons may visit spas to "take the waters" for their purported health benefits.

Thomas Guidott set up a medical practice in the English town of Bath in 1668. He became interested in the curative properties of the hot mineral waters there and in 1676 wrote A discourse of Bathe, and the hot waters there. Also, Some Enquiries into the Nature of the water. This brought the purported health-giving properties of the waters to the attention of the aristocracy, who started to partake in them soon after.

The term spa is used for towns or resorts offering hydrotherapy, which can include cold water or mineral water treatments and geothermal baths, and comes from the Belgian town Spa.

== Spa towns by country ==
=== Argentina ===
- Termas de Rio Hondo
- Presidencia Roque Sáenz Peña

=== Australia ===
There are mineral springs in the Central Highlands of Victoria. Most are in and around Daylesford and Hepburn Springs. Daylesford and Hepburn Springs call themselves "Spa Country" and the "Spa Centre of Australia".

In Queensland, many towns have mineral springs created by artesian bores into the Great Artesian Basin, often the only or primary water supply to the towns. Some of these towns had periods of popularity as spa towns, including Ararmac, Barcaldine, Dalby, Helidon, Innot Hot Springs, and Muckadilla, mostly in the late 1800s and early 1900s when mineral spas were believed to cure various medical conditions. However, the remote locations of most of these towns made them expensive to visit and only small-scale spa facilities developed there. Helidon, a day trip from Brisbane by car, was more successful, particularly with growing ownership of cars after World War II. However, concerns about radioactivity and bacterial contamination resulted in the Helidon Spa falling into disuse by 1994. Many towns in Queensland continue to provide bathing facilities fed by hot springs, but these are promoted as relaxing holiday activities rather than as medical treatments.

=== Belgium ===
- Chaudfontaine (lit. "hot fountain" in French)
- Ostend
- Spa (the eponym for the modern word)

=== Bosnia and Herzegovina ===
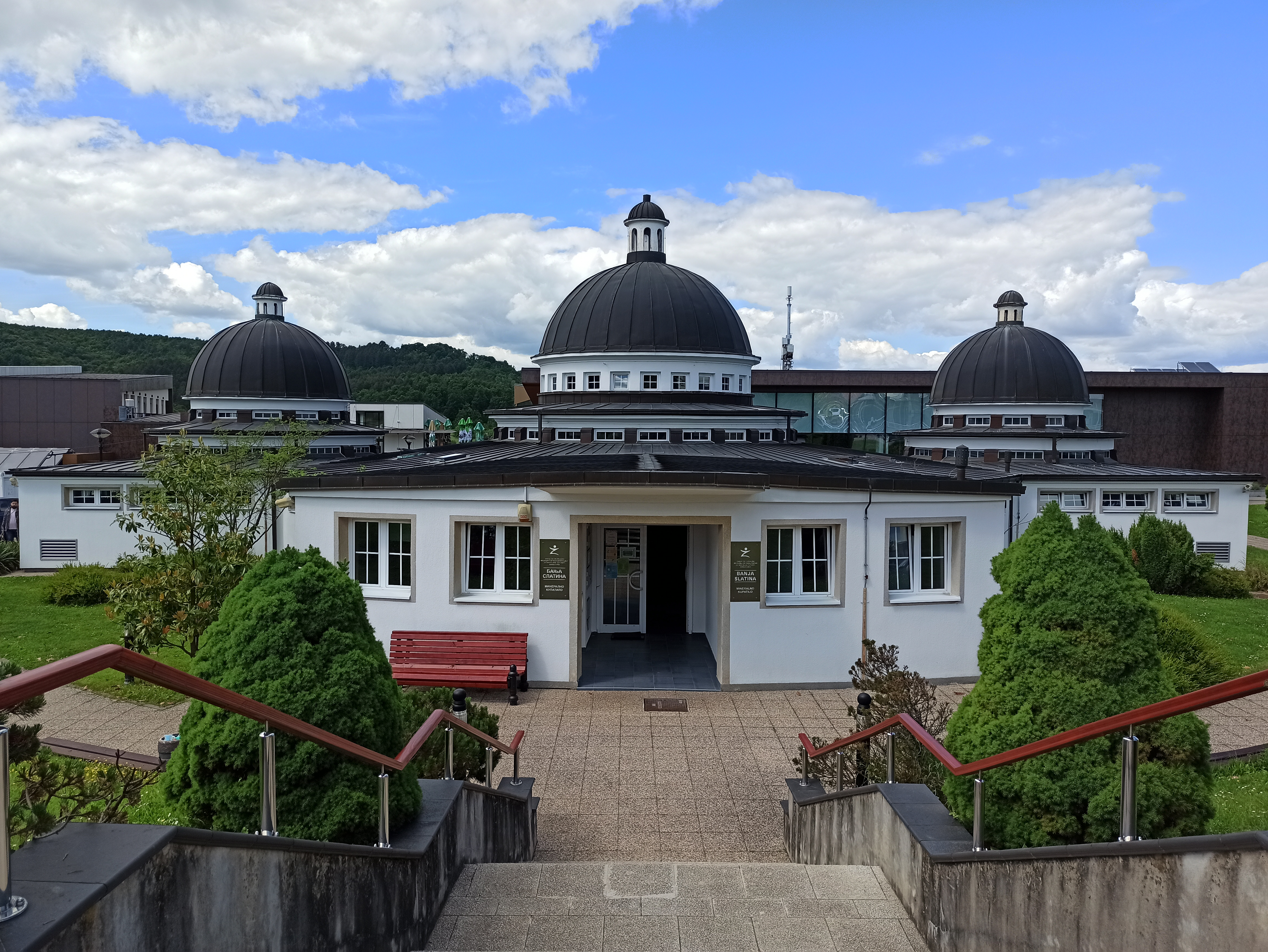
The Slatina Spa

- Banja Ilidža, a spa town near capital Sarajevo
- Banja Slatina, Slatina - Slatina is a spa town, well-known as one of the best health resorts for rheumatism in the region. Slatina has a tradition since 1870s.
- Banja Vrućica, Teslić

=== Brazil ===
Brazil has a growing number of spa towns. The traditional ones are: Águas de Lindoia, Serra Negra, Águas de São Pedro, Caxambu, Poços de Caldas, Caldas Novas, Araxá, and São Lourenço.

=== Bulgaria ===
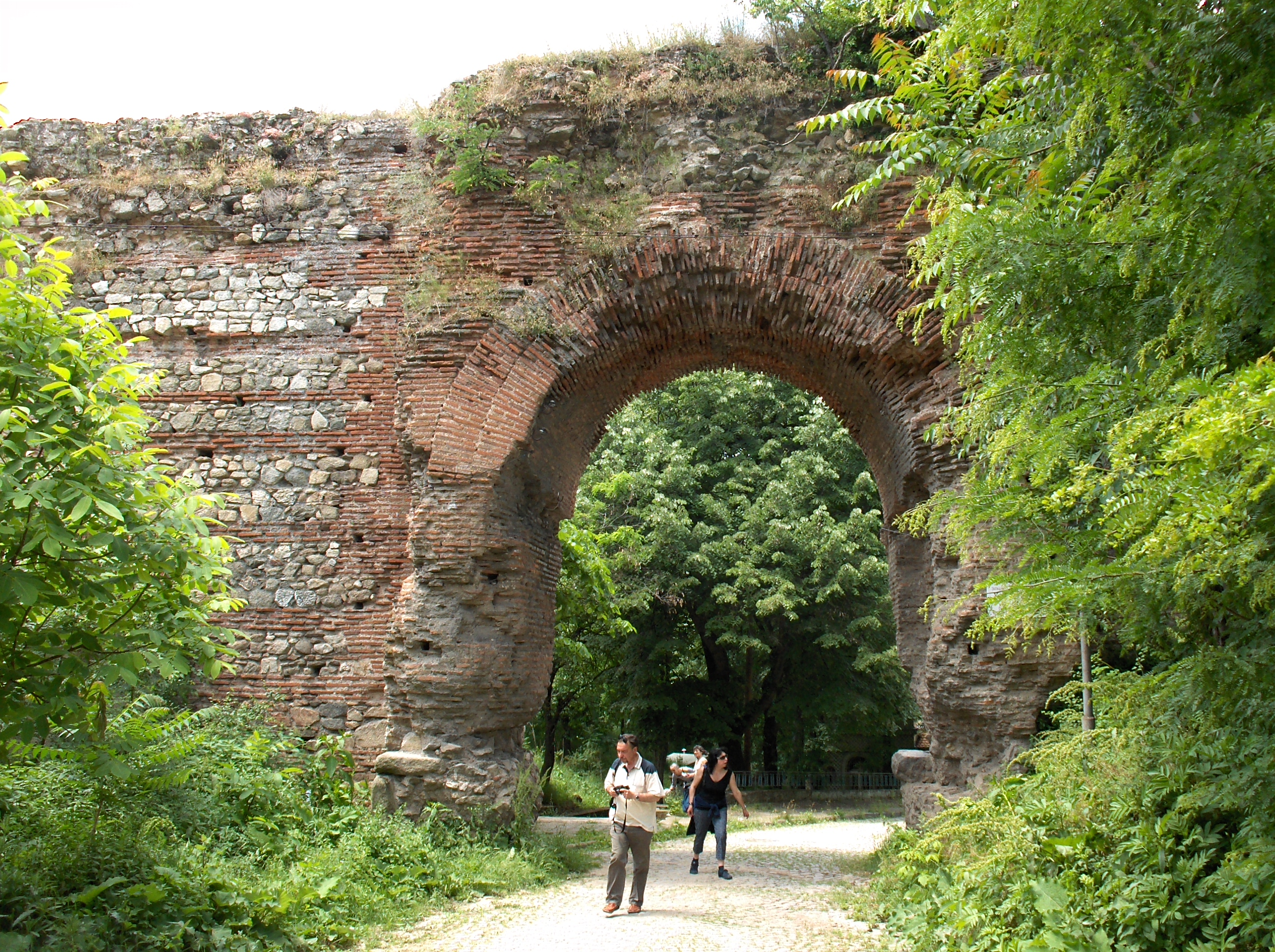
The Roman walls of Hisarya. Many spa towns in Bulgaria have existed since the Roman Empire.

Bulgaria is known for its more than 500 mineral springs, including the hottest spring in the Balkans at Sapareva Banya - 103 °C. Other famous spa towns include Sandanski, Hisarya, Bankya, Devin, Kyustendil, Varshets, Velingrad.

In Bulgarian, the word for a spa is баня (transliterated banya).

=== Canada ===
Harrison Hot Springs is one of the oldest among 18 in British Columbia; there are also two in Alberta and one in Ontario.

=== Croatia ===
In Croatia, the word Toplice implies a spa town. The most famous spa towns in Croatia are Daruvar, Šibenik and Sisak.

=== Czech Republic ===
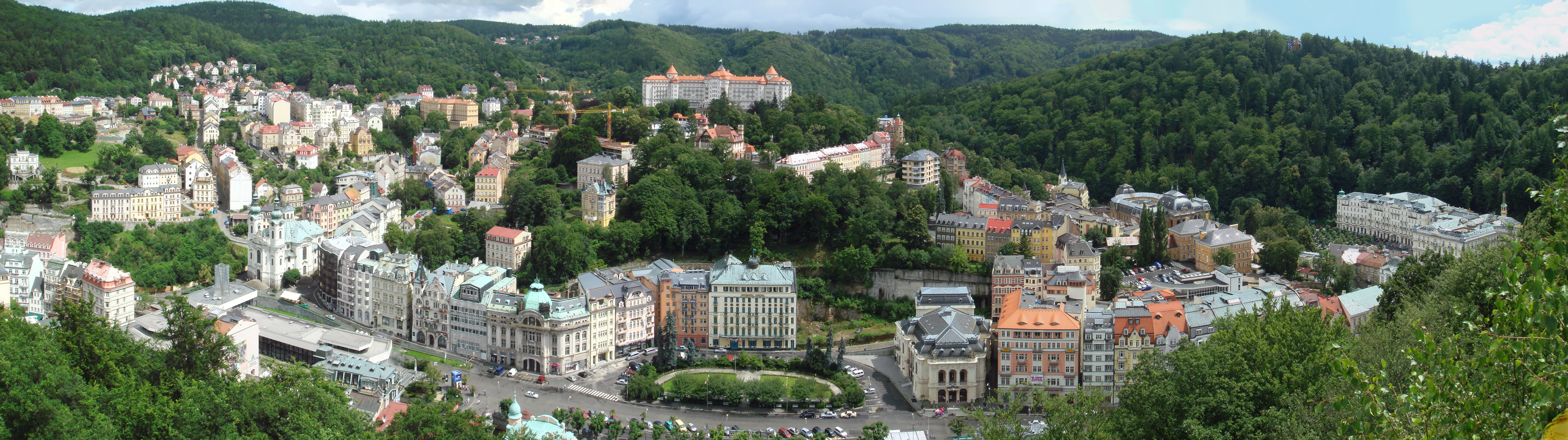
The spa town of Karlovy Vary (Karlsbad)

In Czech, the word Lázně implies a spa town. The most famous spa towns in Czech Republic are the West Bohemian Spa Triangle of Karlovy Vary, Františkovy Lázně and Mariánské Lázně, listed on UNESCO World Heritage Site. Other important spas are Luhačovice, Teplice, Jáchymov, Konstantinovy Lázně, Jeseník, Třeboň, Poděbrady, Bechyně or Velké Losiny.

=== Finland ===
Traditionally, Hanko, Rauma and Kalajoki have been considered spa towns. Today there are more than 50 spas (kylpylä) in Finland; some towns known for their spa centers include Ikaalinen, Naantali and Imatra.

=== France ===
In France, the words bains, thermes and eaux in city names often imply a spa town. There are more than 50 spa towns in France, including Vichy, Aix-les-Bains, Bagnoles-de-l'Orne, Dax, and Enghien-les-Bains.

=== Georgia ===
Borjomi is one such example in south Georgia.

=== Germany ===
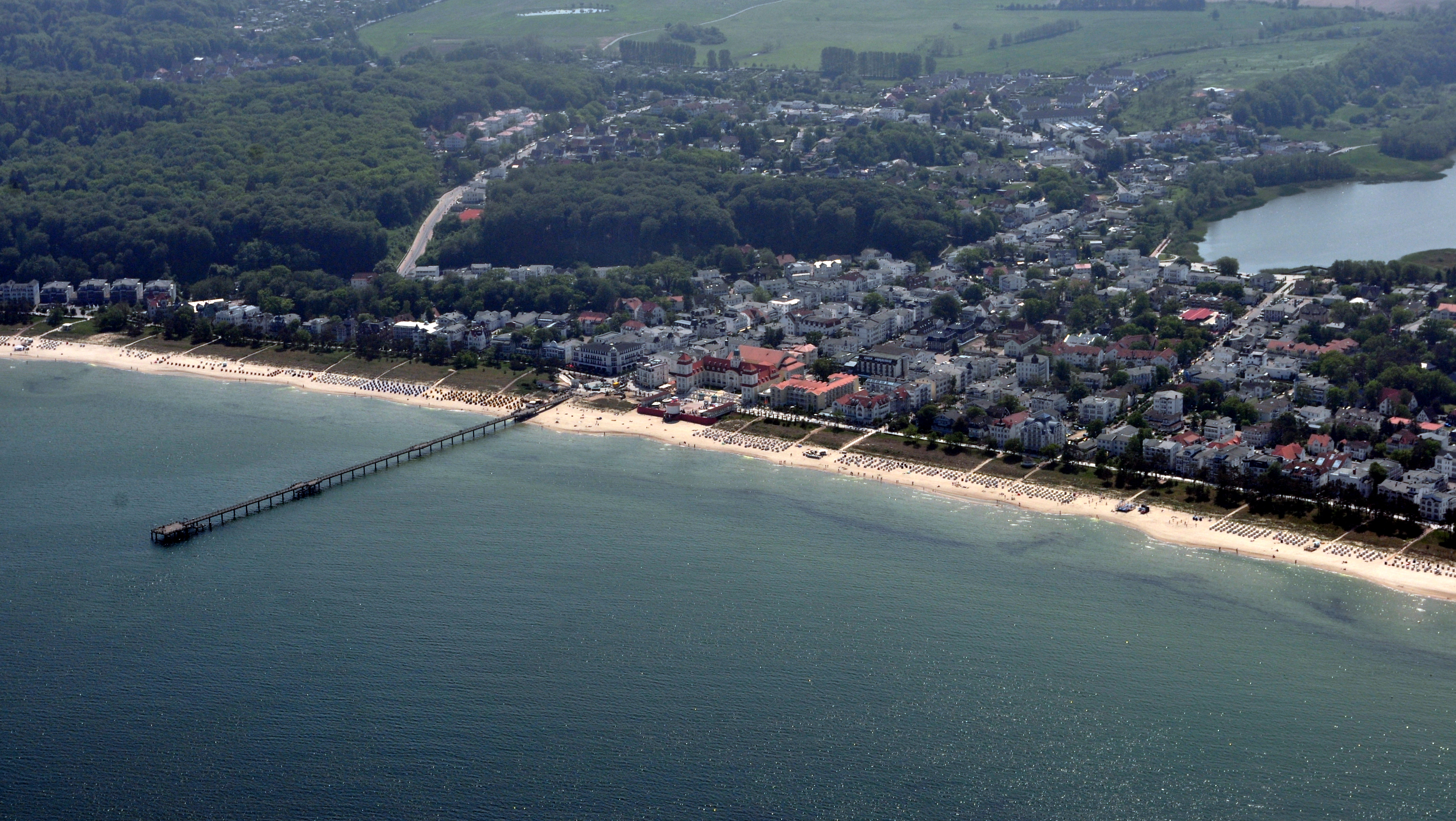
Binz on Rügen Island, Germany

In Germany, the word Bad implies a spa (bath) town. It is also referred to as a "kurort" - a place for curing. Among the many famous spa towns in Germany are Bad Aachen, Baden-Baden, Bad Brückenau, Bad Ems, Bad Homburg, Bad Honnef, Bad Kissingen, Bad Kreuznach, Bad Mergentheim, Bad Muskau, Bad Oeynhausen, Bad Pyrmont, Bad Reichenhall, Bad Saarow, Bad Schandau, Bad Schönborn, Bad Segeberg, Bad Sobernheim, Bad Soden, Bad Tölz, Bad Wildbad, Bad Wimpfen, Bad Wildstein, Berchtesgaden, Binz, Freudenstadt, Heiligendamm, Heringsdorf, Kampen, Königstein, Radebeul, Schwangau, St. Blasien, Titisee, Tegernsee, Travemünde and Zingst. Wiesbaden is the largest spa town in Germany.

=== Greece ===
The most popular spa towns in Greece are Aidipsos, Agkistro, Serres, Loutraki, Kamena Vourla, Kimolos, Loutra Kyllinis, Sidirokastro, Serres, Lakkos Milos, Loutrochori, Aridaia, Pella (Pozar)

=== Hungary ===
In Hungary, the word fürdő or the more archaic füred ("bath"), fürdőváros ("spa town") or fürdőhely ("bathing place") implies a spa town. Hungary is rich in thermal waters with purported health benefits, and many spa towns are popular tourist destinations. Budapest has several spas, including Turkish style spas dating back to the 16th century. Eger also has a Turkish spa. Other famous spas include the ones at Hévíz, Harkány, Bük, Hajdúszoboszló, Gyula, Bogács, Bükkszék, Zalakaros, the Cave Bath at Miskolctapolca and the Zsóry-fürdő at Mezőkövesd.

=== India ===
- Trivandrum
- Varkala
- Kovalam
- Poovar

=== Indonesia ===
- Bali
- Batam

=== Ireland ===
- Lisdoonvarna

=== Italy ===
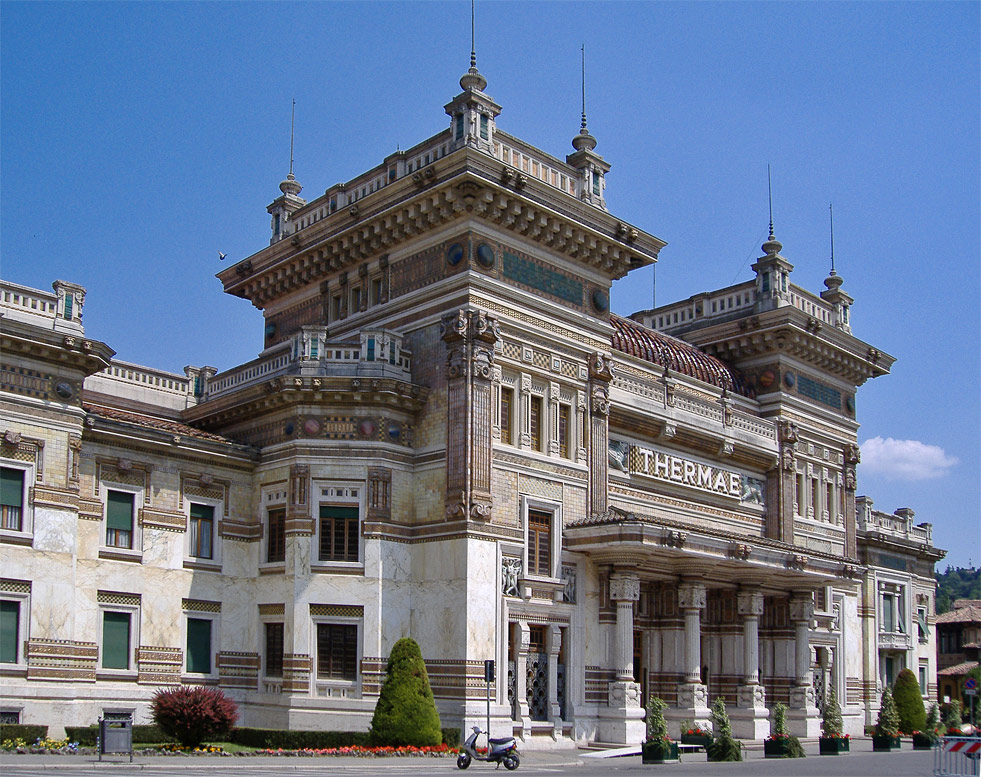
Salsomaggiore Terme, in Northern Italy

In Italy, spa towns, called città termale (from Latin thermae), are very numerous all over the country because of the intense geological activity of the territory. These places were known and used since the Roman age.

=== Kazakhstan ===
- Burabay, lies in the Kokshetau Mountains, part of the Kokshetau Hills of the Kazakh Uplands (Saryarka).

=== Luxembourg ===
- Mondorf-les-Bains

=== Lithuania ===
- Druskininkai - is known for mineral springs. The name comes from Lithuanian word druska - salt.
- Birštonas - is known for mineral springs and curative mud applications.

=== Madagascar ===
- Antsirabe

=== Netherlands ===
- Bad Nieuweschans in the North on the border with Germany, with "Bad" implying a spa town.
- Valkenburg near Maastricht.

=== New Zealand ===
- Rotorua
- Hanmer Springs
- Waiwera
- Te Aroha
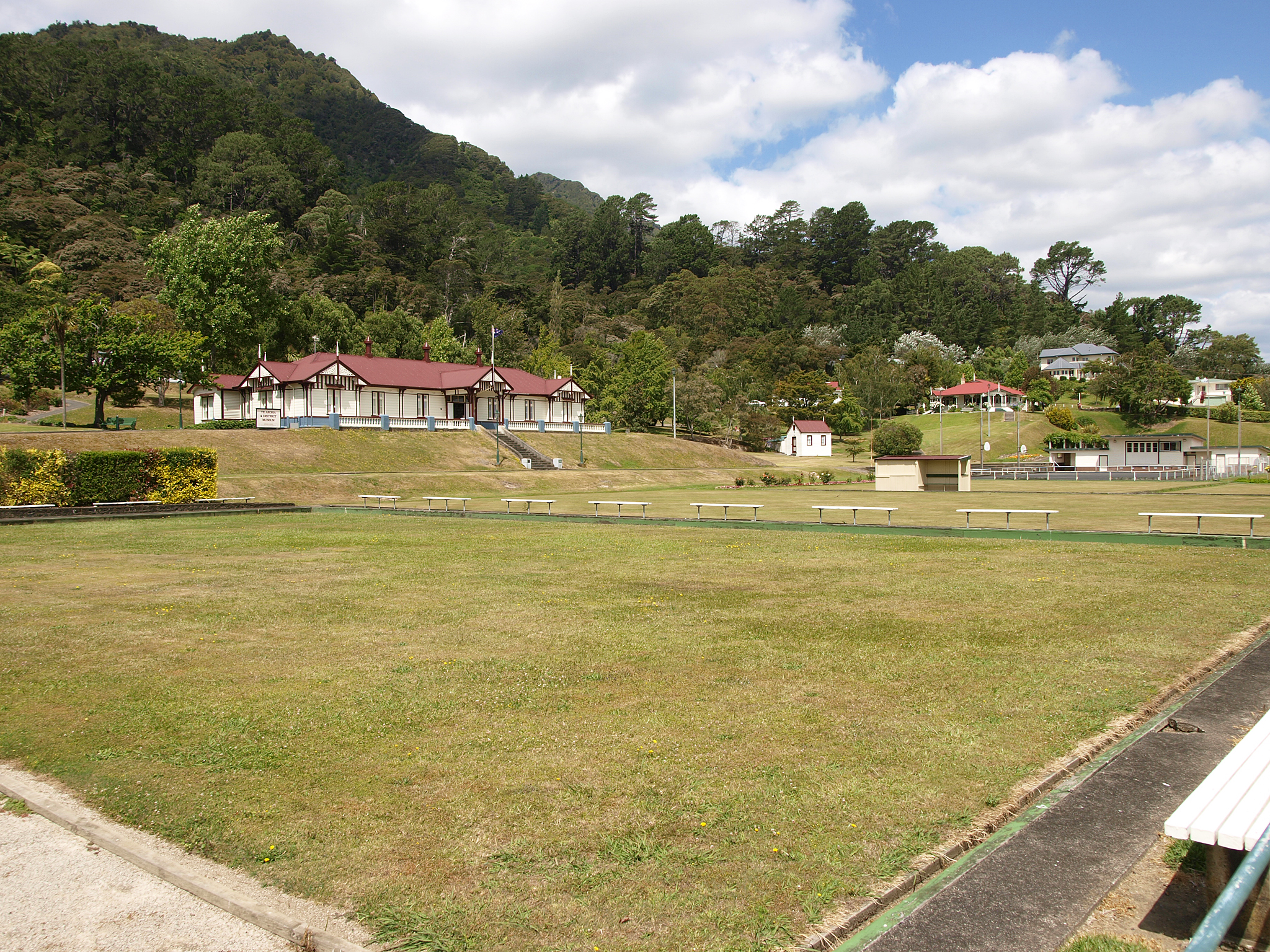
  Te Aroha Hot Springs Domain
- Ngawha Springs
- Te Aroha Hot Springs Domain

=== Poland ===
Most spa towns in Poland are located in the Lesser Poland and Lower Silesian Voivodeships. Some of them have an affix "Zdrój" in their name (written with hyphen or separately), meaning "water spring", to denote their spa status, but this is not a general rule (e.g. Ciechocinek and Inowrocław are spa towns, but do not use the affix).

=== Portugal ===
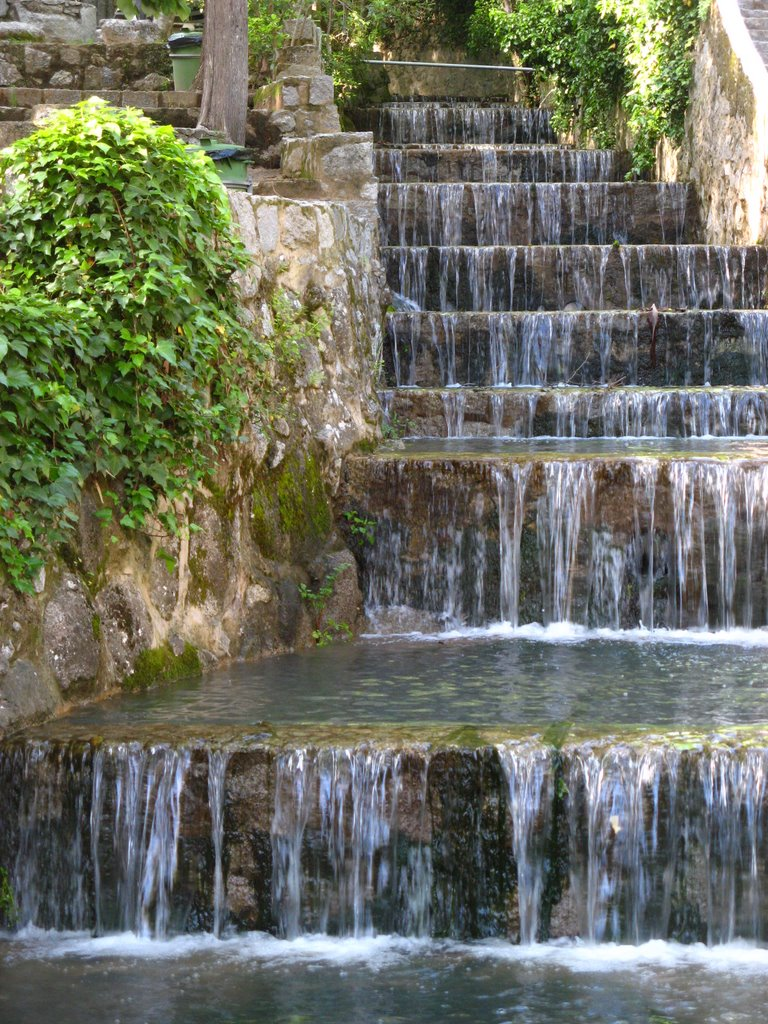
A waterfall in Caldas de Monchique, Algarve (south region of Portugal)

Portugal is well known by famous spa towns throughout of the country.

Due to its high quality, as well as the landscape where are located, the most important ones are:

- Caldas da Rainha
- Caldas das Taipas
- Caldas de Monchique
- Termas do Gerês
- Caldas de Vizela
- Pedras Salgadas
- Vidago
- Chaves
- São Pedro do Sul
- Caldas da Felgueira located in Viseu District, and 5km from Nelas town.
- Termas de Monfortinho
- Caldas de São Jorge

=== Romania ===
In Romania, the word Băile implies a spa town. The most famous spa towns in Romania are Băile Herculane, Băile Felix, Mangalia, Covasna, Călimănești & Borsec.

=== Serbia ===
Serbia is known for its many spa cities. Some of the best known springs are the Vrnjačka Banja, Bukovička Banja, Vrujci, Sokobanja and Niška Banja. The hottest spring in Serbia is at Vranjska Banja (96°C)

In Serbia, the word Banja implies a spa town.

=== Slovakia ===
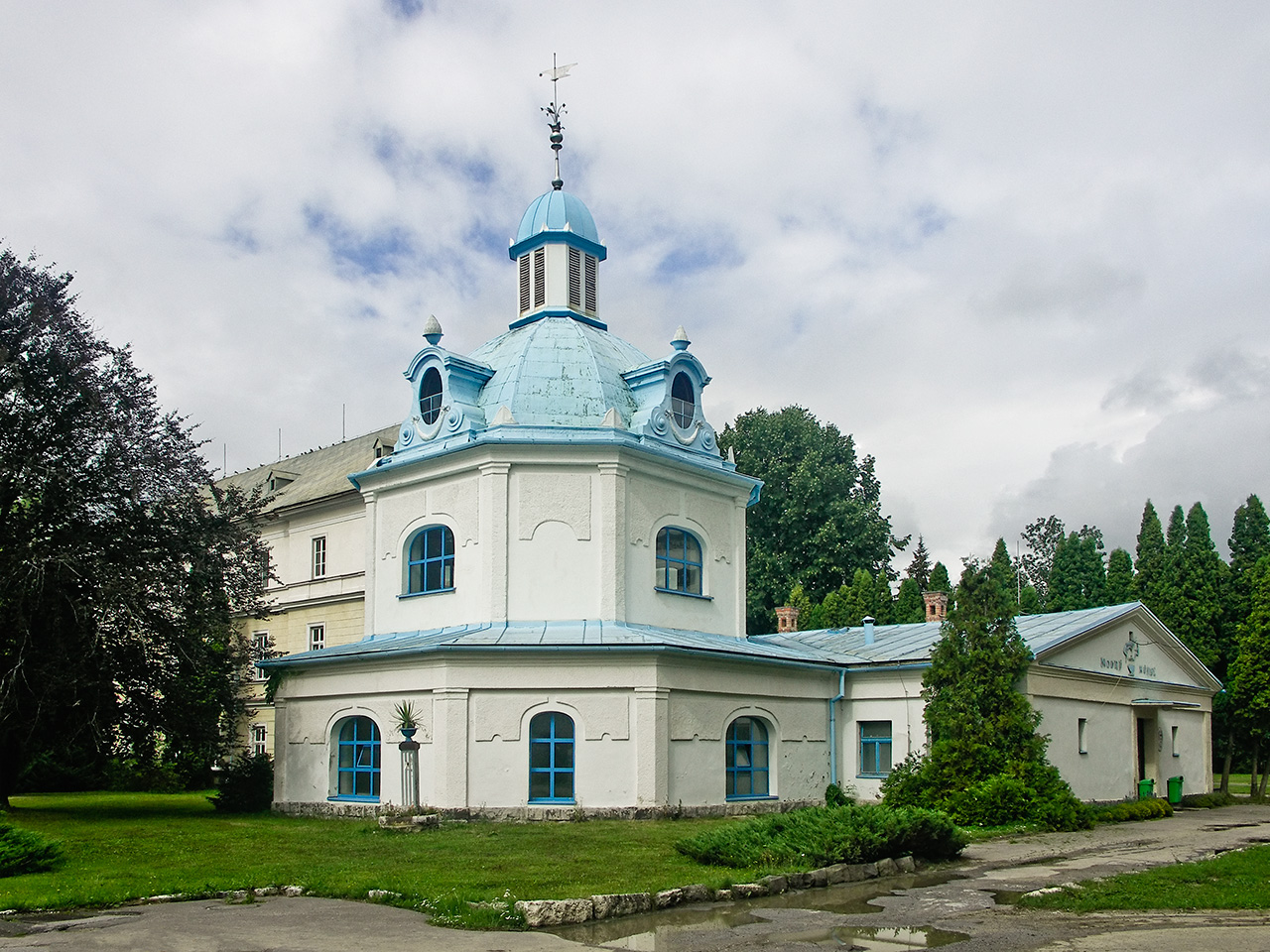
Entrance to the spa in Turčianske Teplice (Slovakia)

Slovakia is well known by its spa towns. The most famous is the city of Piešťany in Trnava Region. Other notable spa towns in Slovakia include:

- Bardejov
- Brusno
- Bojnice
- Číž
- Dudince
- Liptovský Ján
- Lúčky
- Piešťany
- Rajecké Teplice
- Sklené Teplice
- Sliač
- Smrdáky
- Trenčianske Teplice
- Turčianske Teplice

=== Slovenia ===
Spa towns in Slovenia include Rogaška Slatina, Radenci, Čatež ob Savi, Dobrna, Dolenjske Toplice, Šmarješke Toplice, Moravske Toplice, Rimske Toplice, Laško and Topolšica. They offer accommodation in hotels, apartments, bungalows, and camp sites. The Slovenian words terme or toplice imply a spa town.

=== South Africa ===
Spa towns in South Africa include:

- Caledon
- Badplaas
- Bela-Bela
- Tshipise

=== South Korea(한국, 남한) ===
- Dongrae, Busan 동래온천
- Haewundae, Busan해운대온천
- Suanbo 수안보온천
- Yuseong, Daejeon유성온천
- Onyang, Asan온양온천

=== Spain ===
Spa towns in Spain include:

- Alhama de Aragon
- Panticosa in the high Pyrenees
- Archena
- Caldes d'Estrac
- Caldes de Montbui
- Riofrío
- Caldes de Malavella
- Lanjarón
- A Toxa, an island-spa in northwestern Galicia.
- Mondariz
- Arnedillo
- Zestoa
- Karrantza
- Montemayor
- Caldas de Luna

=== Sweden ===
- Ramlösa now a part of Helsingborg

=== Switzerland ===
- Baden
- Bad Ragaz (Ragatz, also known as "Old Baths Pfäfers" or "Old Baths of Pfäfersin")
- Davos
- Lavey-les-Bains
- Leukerbad
- Schinznach Bad
- Yverdon-les-Bains
- Zurzach

=== Taiwan ===
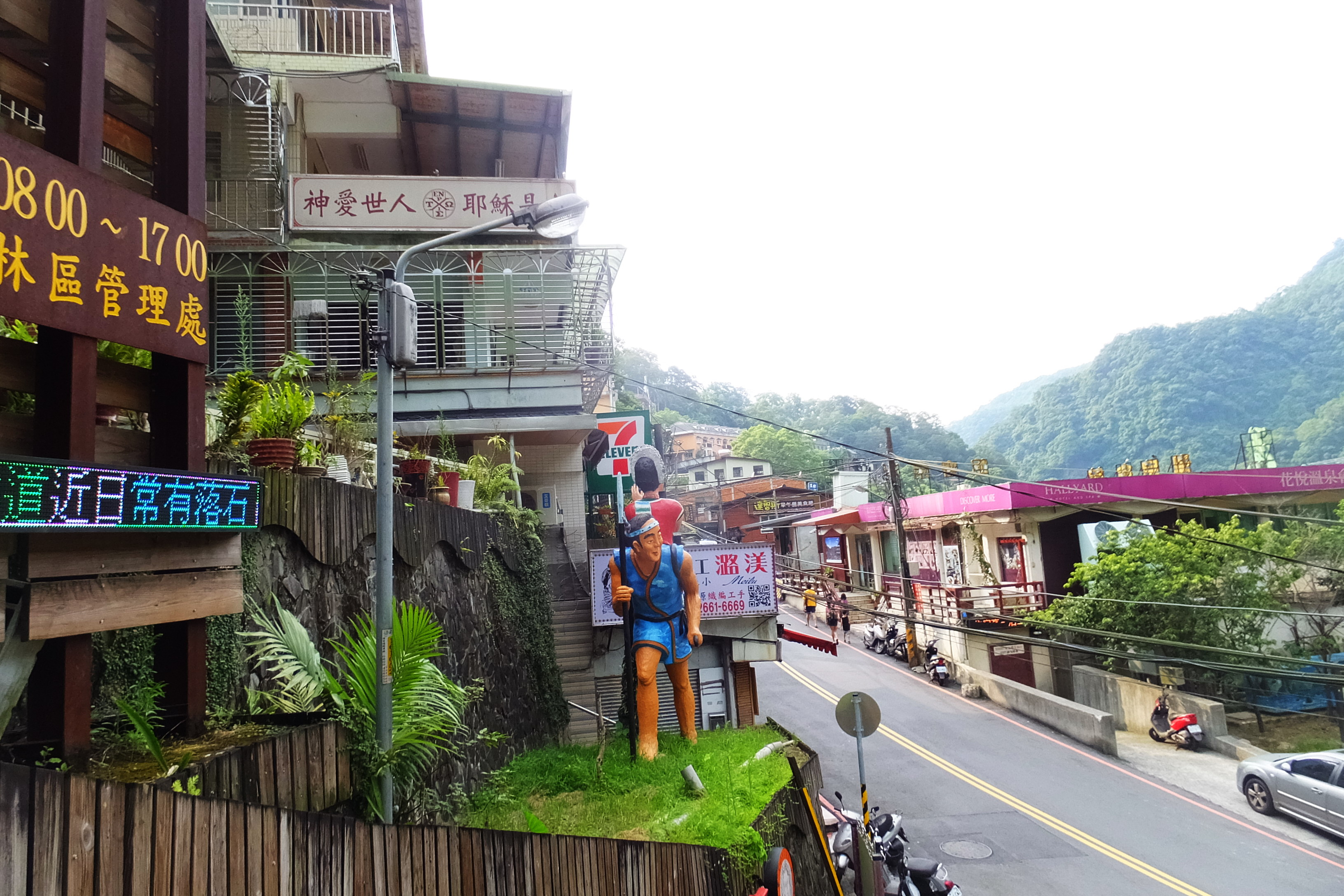
Wulai Hot Spring Street in Wulai, New Taipei, Taiwan

Taiwan is home to a number of towns and cities with tourism infrastructure centered on hot springs. These include:

- Jiaoxi, Yilan
- Wulai, New Taipei
- Beitou District, Taipei City
- Tai'an, Miaoli
- Guguan, in Heping, Taichung

=== Tunisia ===
There are several spa tonws in Tunisia:

- Aïn Draham
- Djebel Oust
- El Hamma
- Hammam Bourguiba
- Hammam-Lif
- Korbous

=== Turkey ===
There are several spa towns in Turkey. The most famous of these is Pamukkale, Denizli where the Pamukkale thermal springs are located.

- Ayder
- Çeşme
- Gönen
- Kızılcahamam
- Pamukkale
- Sandıklı
- Termal

=== Ukraine ===
- Morshyn
- Truskavets

=== United Kingdom ===
Some but not all UK spa towns contain "Spa", "Wells", or "Bath" in their names, e.g., Matlock Bath. Some towns are designated Spa Heritage Towns. Two out of four of the English towns granted the title "Royal", Royal Leamington Spa and Royal Tunbridge Wells, are spa towns.

=== United States ===
- Chena Hot Springs, Alaska
- Eureka Springs, Arkansas
- Hot Springs, Arkansas
- Calistoga, California
- Desert Hot Springs, California
- Palm Springs, California
- Glenwood Springs, Colorado
- Pagosa Springs, Colorado
- Steamboat Springs, Colorado
- Safety Harbor, Florida
- Warm Springs, Georgia
- Lava Hot Springs, Idaho
- West Baden Springs, Indiana
- Mount Clemens, Michigan
- Excelsior Springs, Missouri
- Jemez Springs, New Mexico
- Truth or Consequences, New Mexico
- Gila Hot Springs, New Mexico
- Ballston Spa, New York
- Saratoga Springs, New York
- Hot Springs, North Carolina
- Bedford, Pennsylvania
- Hot Springs, South Dakota
- Mineral Wells, Texas
- Warm Springs, Virginia
- Connell, Washington
- Bath (Berkeley Springs), West Virginia
- Waukesha, Wisconsin
- Saratoga, Wyoming
- Thermopolis, Wyoming

== Terminology ==
Terms used in various countries:

- in the Arab world - Hammam
- in Bulgaria - Bani
- in Chile - Termas
- in Croatia - Toplice
- in Cyprus - Loutra-Therma
- in the Czech Republic - Lázně
- in Ethiopia - Filwoha
- in France - Bains, thermes
- in Georgia - სამკურნალო წყლები
- in Germany, Austria, and Switzerland - Bad, the first part of the names of most spa towns, a cognate to the English "bath" while "Therme" is used for the spa itself.
- in Greece - Loutra-Therma
- in Hungary - fürdő or -füred
- in Italy - Terme
- in Iran - Cheshme Ab-e-Garm" or "Cheshme Ab-e-Madani
- in Japan - Onsen
- in Korea - 온천
- in Mexico- Termas or Balneario
- in Peru - Cuzco, Cajamarca
- in Poland - List of spa towns in Poland
- in Portugal - Caldas or Termas
- in Russia - Минеральные воды or Лечебные воды
- in Romania - Băile
- in Slovakia - Liečebné kúpele
- in Serbia - Banja
- in Spain - Termas or Balneario
- in Turkey - Termal or Kaplica
- in Ukraine - Лікувальні води

== See also ==
- Spa
- Resort architecture
- Spa architecture
- Spa resort
- Hot spring
- Sauna
- Thermae
- Mineral water
- Hydrotherapy
- Sanatorium
- Great Spas of Europe, UNESCO World Heritage site
