= CIZ =

CIZ, Ciz or Číž may refer to:

- Číž, a village in Slovakia
- Číž (surname), a Slavic surname
- Diego Ciz, Uruguayan footballer
- Coari Airport, an airport in Coari, Amazonas, Brazil
- Colegio Ignacio Zaragoza, a Roman Catholic school in Saltillo, Coahuila, Mexico, and one of the Lasallian educational institutions
- Cumulative Impact Zones, a kind of zone related to the Licensing Act 2003 in the United Kingdom
- Chizhou, a city in Anhui, China
- ZNF384, a protein-coding gene
