= Čížek =

Čížek (feminine: Čížková) is a Czech surname. The surname translates as 'siskin', but it is also a diminutive of the surname Číž. Notable people with the surname include:

- Andy Cizek (born 1992), American singer
- Bohuš Čížek (1913–1989), Czech painter, illustrator and lecturer
- Franz Cižek (born František Čížek; 1865–1946), Czech-Austrian painter and teacher
- Karel Čížek (1892–1948), Czech rower
- Katerina Cizek (born 1969), Canadian filmmaker
- Martin Čížek (born 1974), Czech footballer
- Roy Cizek (1943–1993), American inventor
- Tomáš Čížek (born 1978), Czech footballer
- Václav Čížek (born 1989), Czech ice hockey player
- Zuzana Čížková (born 1982), Czech sculptor and painter

== See also ==
- Czyż, Polish surname
