= Czyż =

Czyż (Polish pronunciation: [ˈtʂɨʐ]) is a surname of Polish language origin, meaning "siskin". Surnames of similar derivations include Czyżewski and Czyżowicz. The Czech/Slovak equivalent is Číž and the Belarusian form is Chyzh.

The surname may refer to:

- Bobby Czyz (born 1962), American boxer
- Henryk Czyż (1923–2003), Polish musician
- Marek Czyż (born 1968), Polish journalist and news presente
- Olek Czyż (born 1990), Polish basketball player
- Przemysław Czyż (born 1972), Polish diplomat
- Szymon Czyż (born 2001), Polish footballer
- Tom Czyz, American detective
- Vincent Czyz, American avant-garde fiction writer
- Wojtek Czyz (born 1980), German Paralympic track and field athlete
- Lejzor Czyż, the birth name of Leonard Chess (1917–1969), American record company executive
- Fiszel Czyż, the birth name of Phil Chess (1921–2016), American record company executive

== See also ==
- Chyzh, Belarusian surname
- Čížek, Czech surname
- Eurasian siskin Spinus spinus, aka. a Czyż
