= Čížkov (Pelhřimov District) =

- Municipality
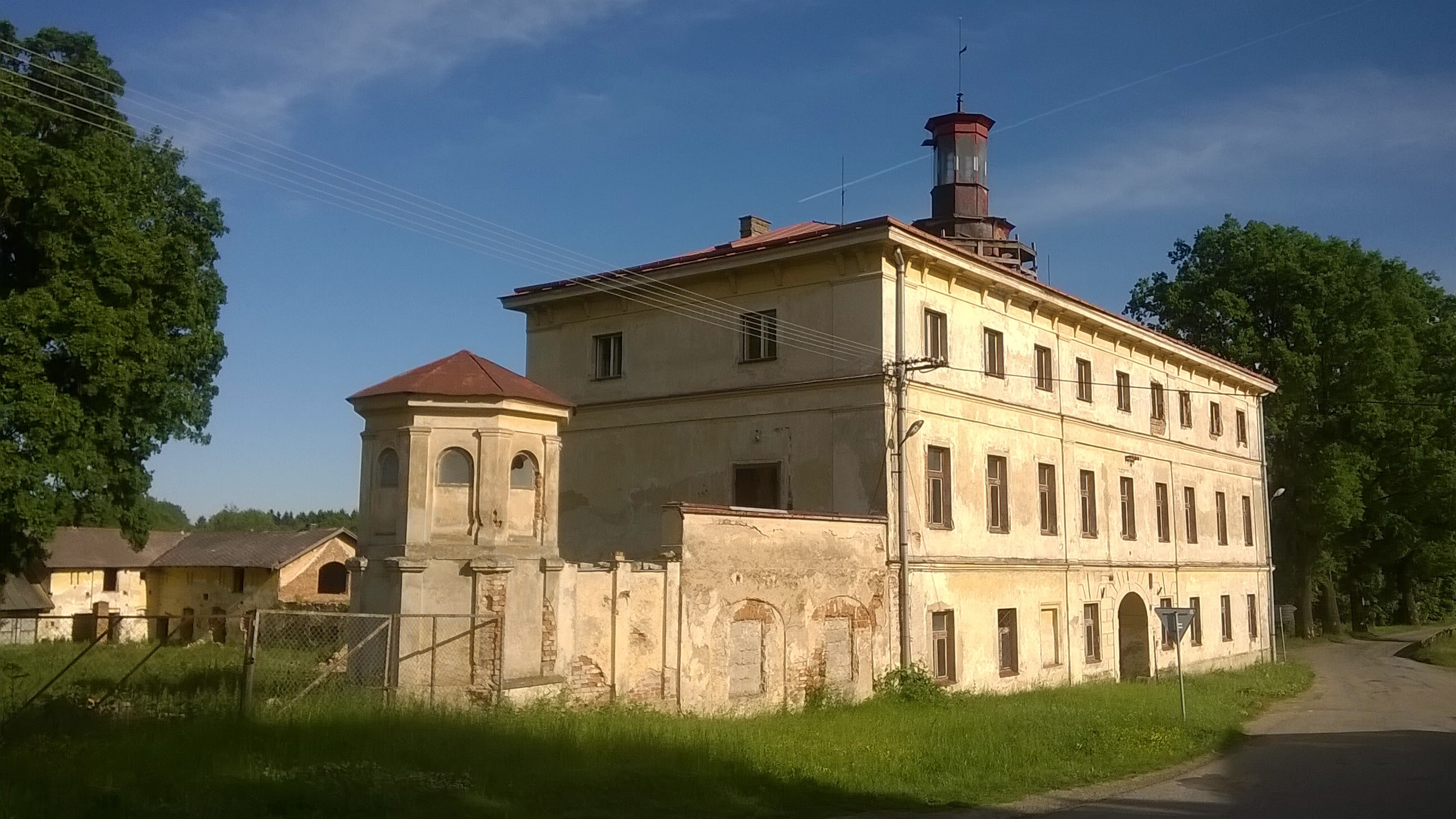
- Čížkov Castle with a gazebo

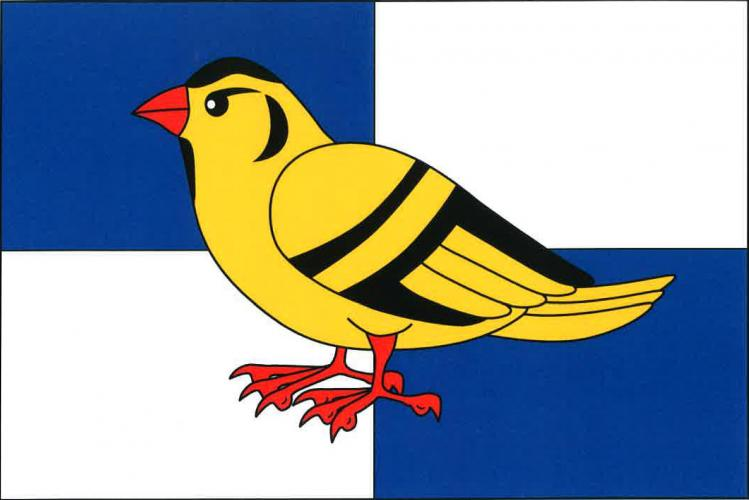
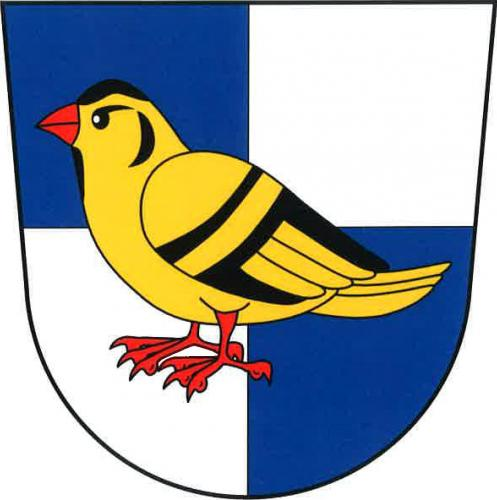
- Flag Coat of arms

- Location in the Czech Republic
- Coordinates: 49°26′26″N 15°7′7″E
- Country: Czech Republic
- Region: Vysočina
- District: Pelhřimov
- First mentioned: 1379

Area
  - Total: 3.03 km^{2} (1.17 sq mi)
- Elevation: 609 m (1,998 ft)

Population (2026-01-01)
  - Total: 142
  - Density: 46.9/km^{2} (121/sq mi)
- Time zone: UTC+1 (CET)
  - Summer (DST): UTC+2 (CEST)
- Postal code: 393 01
- Website: www.cizkov.eu

Čížkov is a municipality and village in Pelhřimov District in the Vysočina Region of the Czech Republic. It has about 100 inhabitants.

== Etymology ==
The name is derived from the personal name Čížek, meaning "Čížek's (court)".

== Geography ==
Čížkov is located about 7 kilometres (4 mi) west of Pelhřimov and 33 km (21 mi) west of Jihlava. It lies in the Křemešník Highlands. The highest point is at 622 m (2,041 ft) above sea level. In the centre of the village is a system of four fishponds, supplied by a nameless stream that originates here.

== History ==
The first written mention of Čížkov is from 1379, when it belonged to the Červená Řečice, owned by the Archdiocese of Prague. Later it was annexed to the Nová Cerekev estate and then to the Božejov and Horní Cerekev estates. In the second half of the 16th century, Čížkov was bought by the Leskovský of Leskovec family. They made the village the centre of a separate estate in 1661.

From 1850 to 1976, it was an independent municipality. Čížkov was a municipal part of Horní Cerekev between 1976 and 1990, but since November 1990, it has been again a separate municipality.

== Demographics ==
Historical population

Year	Pop.	±%
1869	316	—
1880	286	−9.5%
1890	311	+8.7%
1900	295	−5.1%
1910	265	−10.2%

Year	Pop.	±%
1921	244	−7.9%
1930	220	−9.8%
1950	201	−8.6%
1961	183	−9.0%
1970	205	+12.0%

Year	Pop.	±%
1980	148	−27.8%
1991	116	−21.6%
2001	125	+7.8%
2011	132	+5.6%
2021	137	+3.8%

Source: Censuses

== Transport ==
The I/19 road (the section from Tábor to Pelhřimov) runs through the municipality.

== Sights ==
Among the protected cultural monuments in the municipality are a Baroque granary from the 18th century, a Neoclassical gazebo in the castle garden, and the birth house of the poet František Jaromír Rubeš (formerly a brewery), who is considered the most notable local native.

The main landmark of Čížkov is the Čížkov Castle. It was originally a fortress, built in the mid-17 century. In 1785, it was rebuilt into the current Empire castle. In the 20th century, it was transformed into an agricultural school and lost its historical value. Today the castle is unused and falling into disrepair.
