= Chyzh =

Chyzh (Belarusian: Чыж) or Chizh (Russian: Чиж) is an East Slavic surname referring to the Eurasian siskin (Spinus spinus). It is equivalent to the Polish surname Czyż and the Czech surname Číž. Notable people with this surname include:

- Aleksandr Chizh (born 1997), Belarusian footballer
- Aleksandr Chizh (footballer, born 2002), Belarusian footballer
- Maksim Chizh (born 1993), Belarusian footballer
- Yury Chyzh (born 1963), Belarusian businessman

== See also ==
- Chizh & Co, Russian rock band
