= The Cizek Model One =

Loudspeaker system

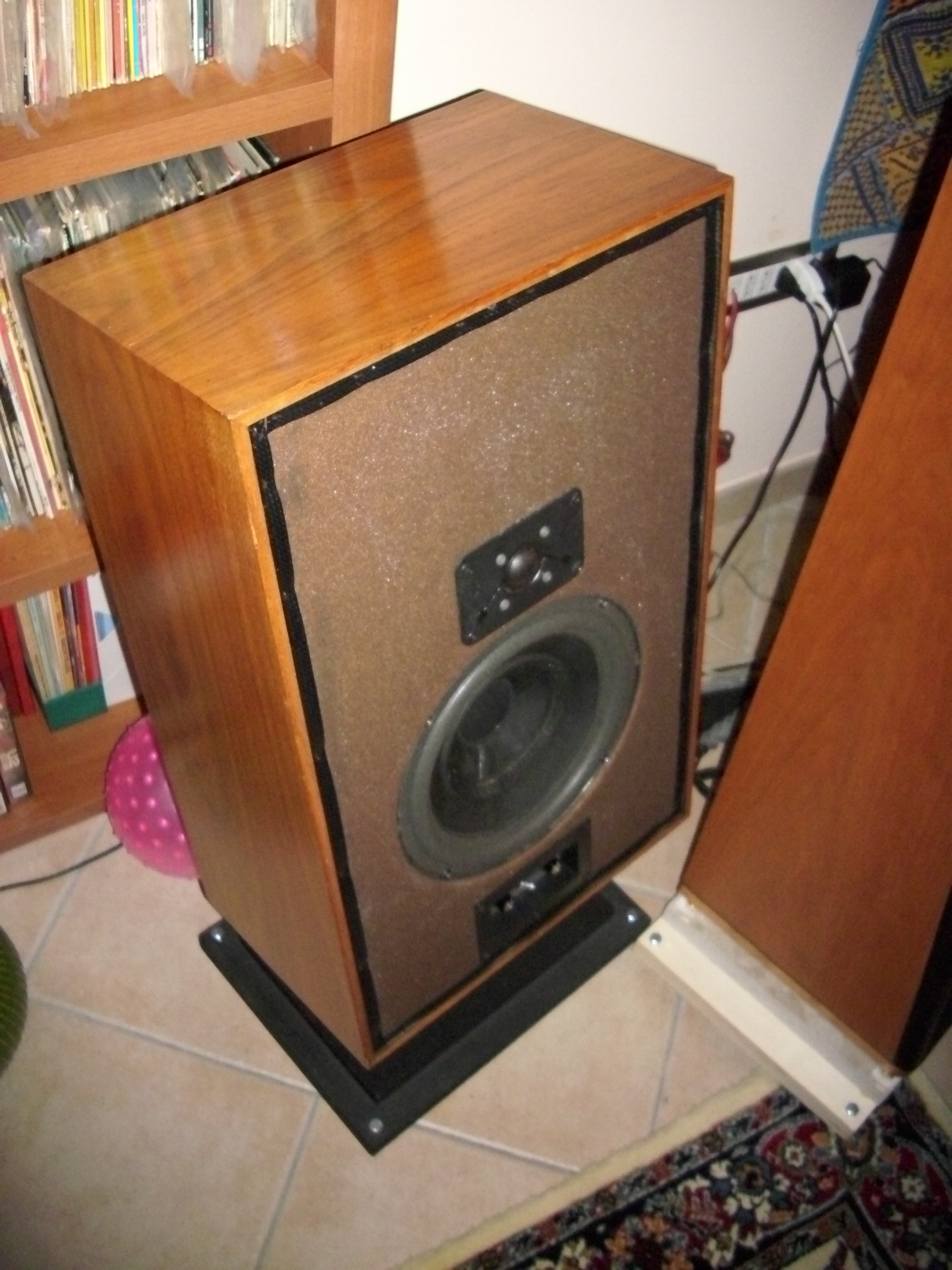
The Cizek Model One (first edition).

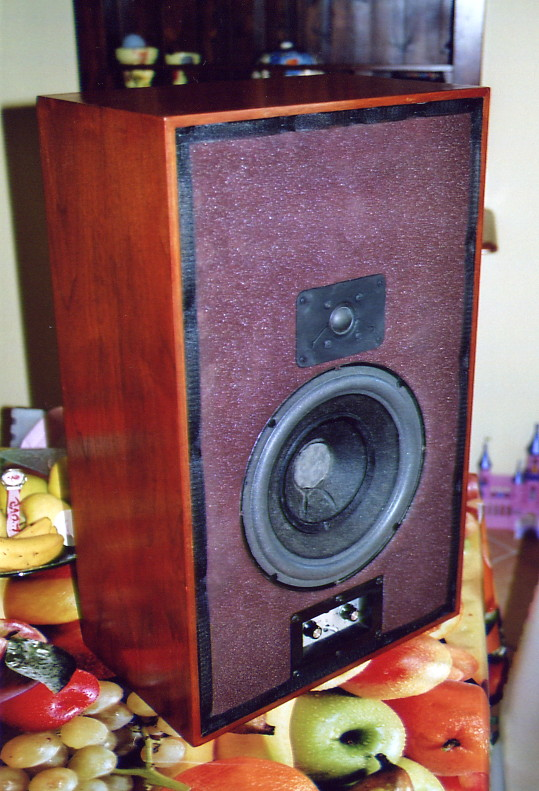
The Cizek Model One (a refurbished model).

The Cizek Model One was the first HIFI product of CIZEK Audio System, a two-way bookshelf loudspeaker system which gave a certain notoriety to Roy Cizek, founder of the company.

This product was important because it was the first loudspeaker system which, due to its particular crossover, showed a flat impedance curve (except for the resonance peak) with a consequent easier work for the amplifier and linear frequency response.

Another peculiarity of the Cizek One was a switch that permitted selection of the Q factor of the bass frequencies; thus, the listener could choose a more or less controlled bass depending on the kind of music or ambient acoustic characteristics. The Cizek Model One became the most successful product of the Company since 1976, its first year of production.
