= Číž (surname) =

Číž (feminine: Čížová) is a Czech and Slovak surname. It refers to the Eurasian siskin (Spinus spinus). A diminutive form of the surname is Čížek. The surname is also related to the Polish cognate Czyż and to the Belarusian cognate Chyzh. Notable people with this surname include:

- Adam Číž (born 1991), Czech basketball player
- Miroslav Číž (1954–2022), Slovak politician

== See also ==
- Diego Ciz, Uruguayan footballer
