= Slatina, Laktaši =

Populated place in Republika Srpska, Bosnia and Herzegovina

Slatina Слатина (Serbian)
- City
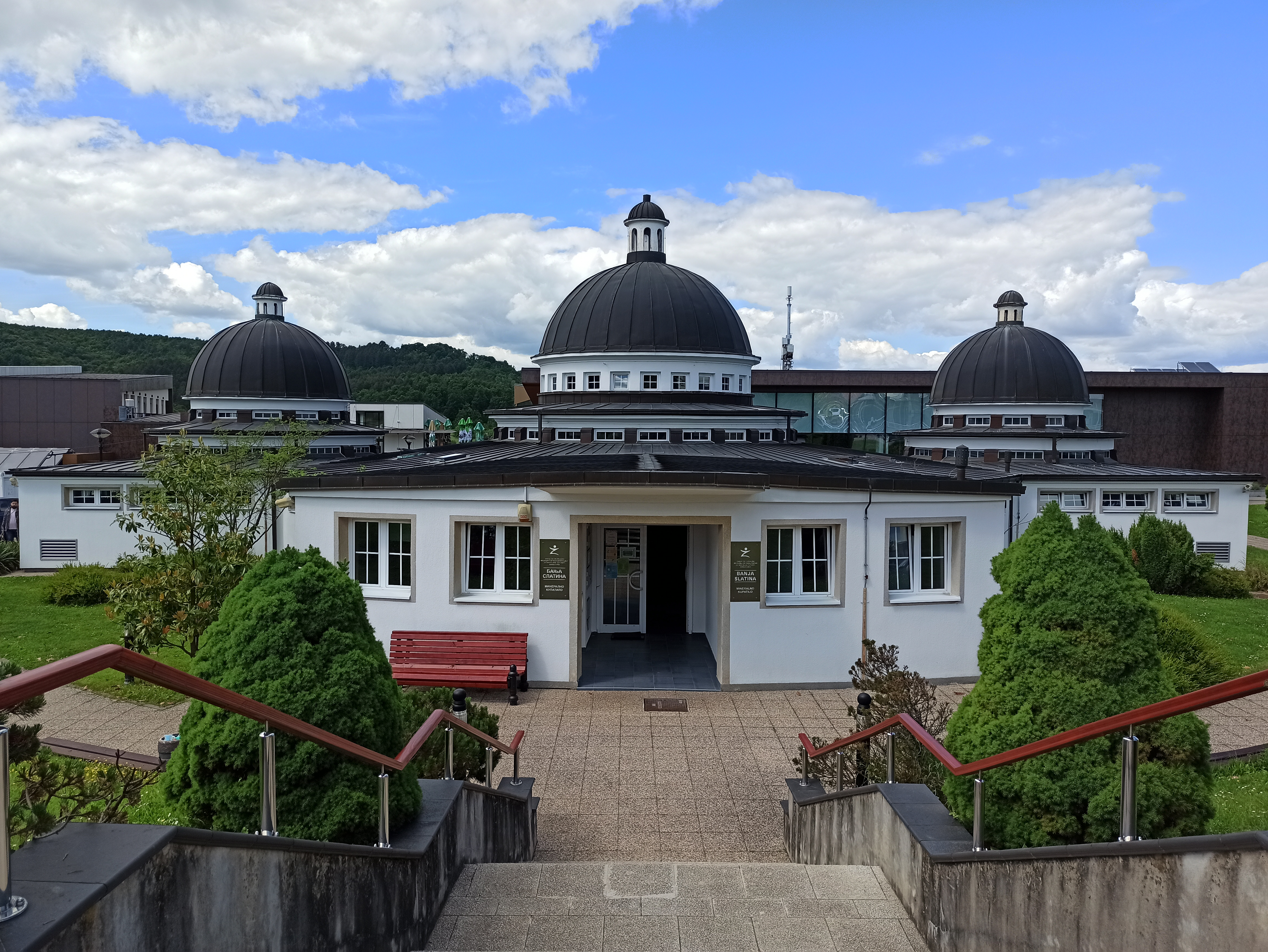
- The Slatina Spa
- Interactive map of Slatina
- Country: Bosnia and Herzegovina
- Entity: Republika Srpska
- Geographical region: Bosanska Krajina

Area
  - Total: 19.69 km^{2} (7.60 sq mi)
- Elevation: 220 m (720 ft)

Population (2013 census)
  - Total: 1,344
- Time zone: UTC+1 (CET)
  - Summer (DST): UTC+2 (CEST)

Slatina (Serbian Cyrillic: Слатина, pronounced: [slatina]) is a spa town in the municipality of Laktaši in Republika Srpska, Bosnia and Herzegovina. The history of the spa resort dates from the 1820s. According to the 2013 census, the town has a population of 1,344.

== Geography ==
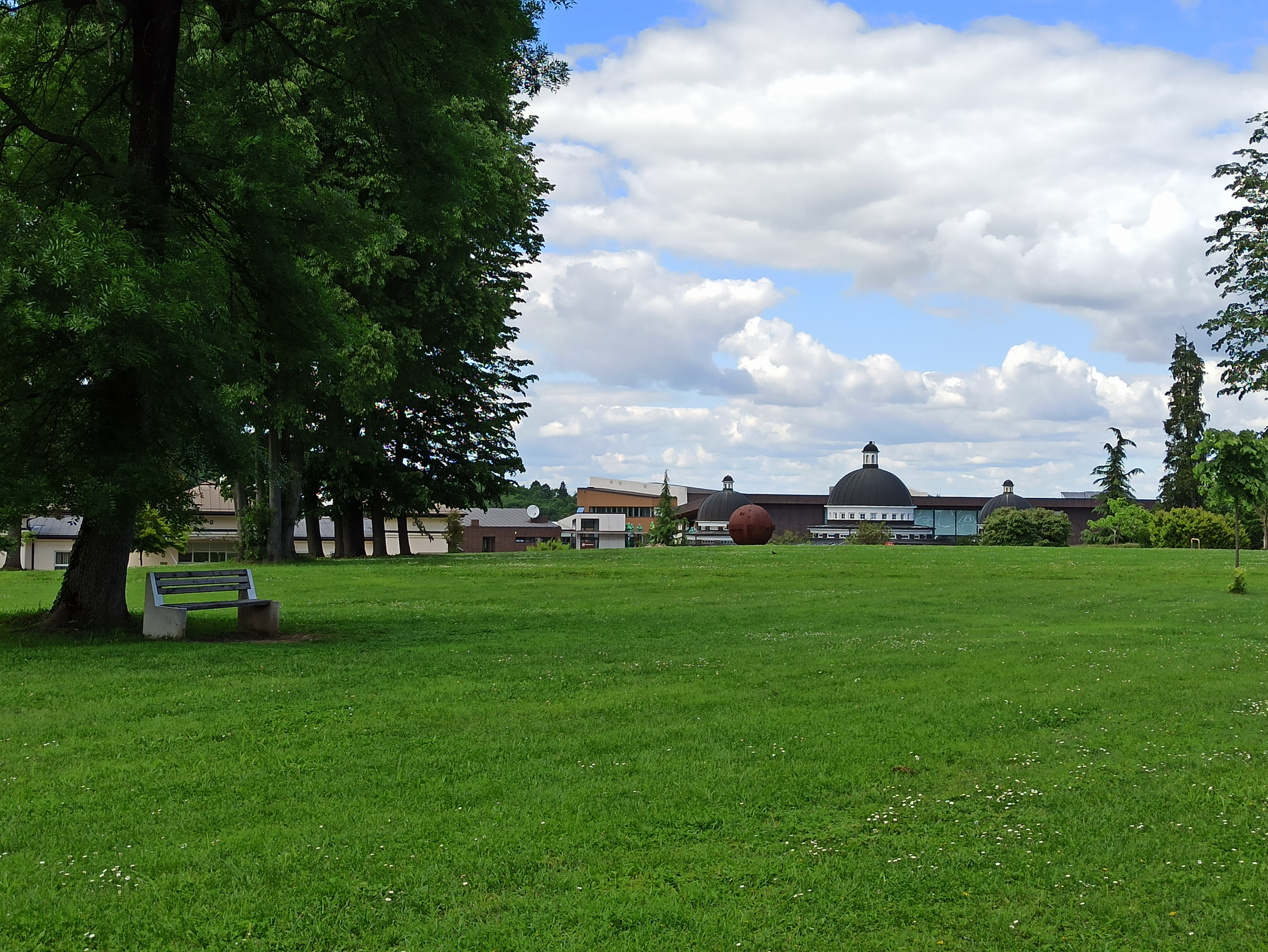
The Spa Park

=== Name ===
The priest, Stevan Davidović (1856–1900) mentions: " ... Slatina has got its name after a gold mine, from which gold was mined; firstly, it was Zlatina (zlato – Bosnian for gold), and from there it later became Slatina". Research did not confirm there was any gold mines in Slatina. The famous Serbian linguist, Vuk Karadžić mentions: "Slatina is a place where the salty and sour water springs, so the cattle come and lick it and that is why the villages are so named."

=== Geographical position ===
Slatina is located at about 15 km to the north-east from the city of Banjaluka. The main road connection to the city of Banjaluka represents a regional road via Krčmarice Pass. The central part of Slatina is located on a plateau and Slatina is divided into six fractions, most of which are located at a higher altitude than the centre of Slatina.

=== Relief ===
Relief of Slatina is hilly, with an altitude increase towards the mountain Crni Vrh (546 m). The centre of Slatina, as well as the spa complex are located at a plateau. Mountain Crni Vrh and other hills overhang Slatina.

=== Hydrography ===
There is a small river Slatina, which flows through Slatina. Other watercourses are smaller, seasonal streams. A great wealth of drinking water sources was very significant for the life of the residents of Slatina in the past.

=== Climate ===
Slatina belongs to the temperate-continental climate and also characteristic for the place is its sunshine, which is about 1800 hours a year.

== History ==
=== Ancient times ===
The area of Slatina was populated in the Roman times. According to the material evidences, found on the archaeological sites on the localities of Babića brdo, Ciganska glava, Janjića brda, the hills in the villages of Blaško and Šušnjari, on Dvorine, Klepala, Joldžića brdo, Stražbenica and other, it is reliably known that this area was populated even in the ancient times.

=== Discovery of the thermal and healing water sources in Slatina ===
Thermal and healing water sources were discovered in the ancient times and material evidents for that are Roman coins, found in the thermal pools.

=== Middle Ages ===
The Slatina Region, after the arrival of Slavs, was a part of the province of Panonia, under the rule of Ljudevit Posavski. It is assumed that it was later a part of Župa Vrbas and later of Župa Vrbanja. From the material evidents from that period, the most important is a tombstone, found in the 1830s, near the Old Church in the village of Malo Blaško, near Slatina. The Marl Board has engraved decorations and an inscription in Glagolitic in three rows (here in Cyrilic): Мартин лежи Василев син се писа Миле с(и)н. This tombstone belongs to the period of the 14th and 15th century. It is known, that there were about 20 stećaks (medieval tombstones), which were destroyed through the time, as well as on the cemetery in the nearby village of Jaružani.

In the period of the Ottoman rule, it is known that there were great oppression of the local people and well-known families of landowners were Karabegović and Silahić, especially a man, Mehmed Čardžić stood out.

According to the Extensive census of the Bosnian Sandžak from the year of 1604, it is known that place had 36 houses, which paid a total tax of 8.090 akča.

In that time, there was no organized usage of thermal water, so Slatina was for centuries, just a small settlement in the hills.

=== The beginnings of spa resort ===
The development of the modern Slatina Spa begins in the end of the Ottoman rule – in the 1820s. According to the records of the priest, Stevan Davidović, from the year 1886: "60 years ago ... a Turk, Mehmed Čardžić, came from Banjaluka and for one night, he fenced a huge space around the spa which raja (oppressed local people) later cleared and he appropriated it to himself, without any rights, so that now entire that land around the baths (thermal pools) is his".

From this text, as well as from many other, it is known that there was a spa in Slatina (the spa facilities), since the Roman times. It was later destroyed, due to the dilapidation.

So the foundations of the modern Slatina Spa (to differ from the Roman spa) were laid, as well as the spa resort.

With the arrival of the new, Austro-Hungarian rule, in the period 1880–1890 started the building of the first clear thermal water pool and the mud pool with the thermal water and the thermal water source was arranged.

The first thermal water analyses were done by an Austro-Hungarian chemist E. Ludwig in 1888.

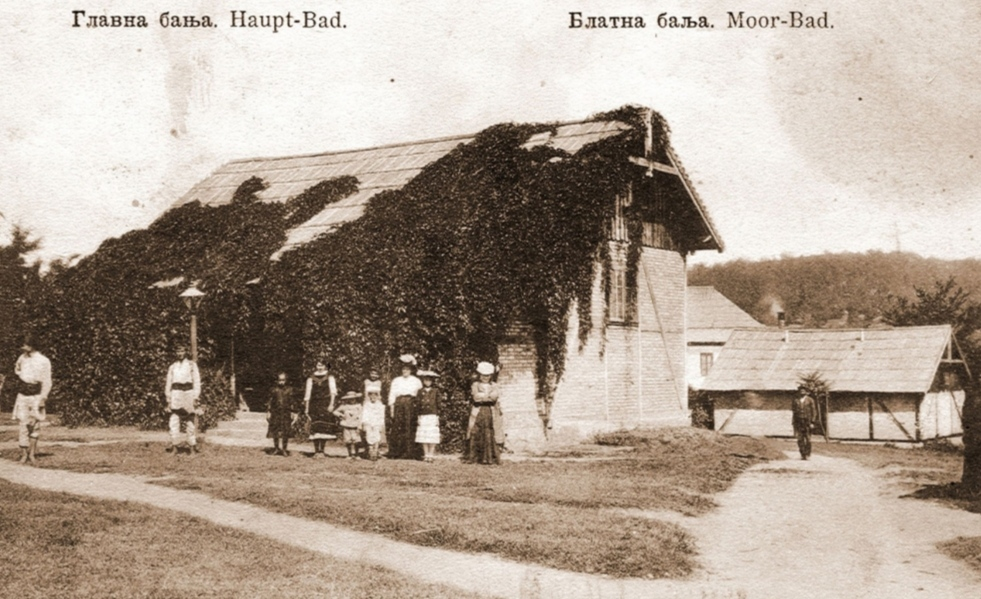
Spa facility Volksbad

In 1909 started the building of Volksbad – the public pool with the separated entrances and locker rooms for men and women.

From the other parts of the Austro-Hungarian Monarchy, in Slatina arrive many families of experts, so in Slatina lived several Czech, Russian, Slovenian and Ukrainian families.

The hard life of the local people did not change, all the huge taxes remained, but that has also started to change in the beginning of the 20th century.

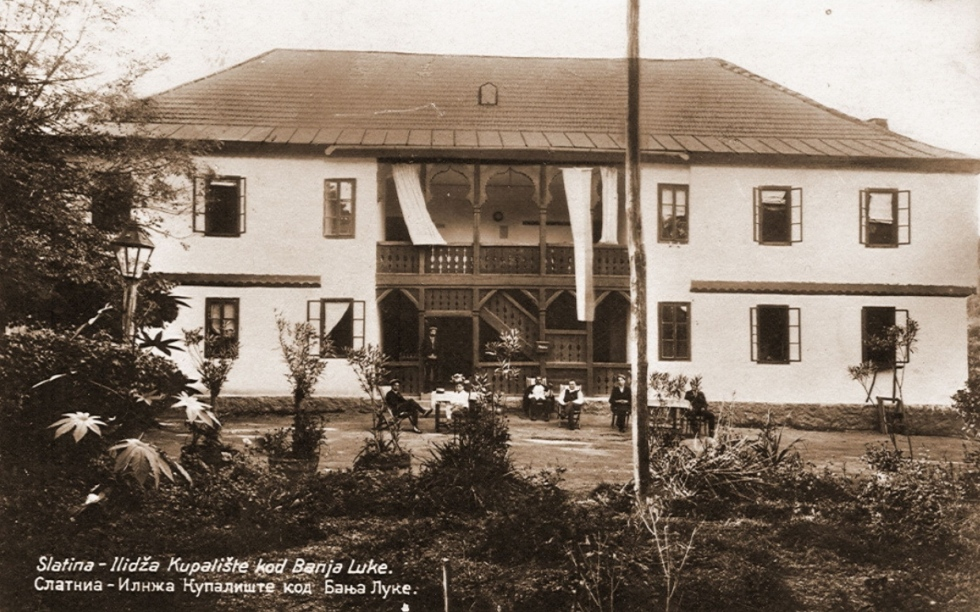
The State Hotel in Slatina

In that period, the first hotels were built - Mehmed Čardžić's, Luka Kuruzović's, Đorđe Avdalović's and more modern The State Hotel with a restaurant (1897), the first postcards of Slatina (1900), the school (1912), Serbian cultural and educational Association Prosvjeta from Sarajevo Board – Blaško-Slatina (1913), as well as a weather station (1905, worked until 1934).

=== Slatina becomes a famous spa resort ===
The period of the Kingdom of Yugoslavia remained remembered as a Golden Age of Slatina, flourishing of the development of Slatina and its placement into the famous spa resorts in Europe.

In 1922, the bus transportation started in Slatina, on the line Slatina – Banjaluka, as well as transport by the luxurious vehicle (car) – from the Divjak brothers. In the first tourist guide book (1938) is mentioned, that there is a good bus transportation from Banjaluka (the city) via Slatina to Klašnice, Bosanska Gradiška (Bosnian Gradiška), Okučani or Prnjavor, Derventa, Bosanski Brod (Bosnian Brod), as well as to Jajce and Sarajevo.

Tourism and the number of visitors in Slatina grew in that time, so after the importance, Slatina was among the most visited places in Vrbaska banovina. A significant number of tourists was from abroad, the most numerous were German, Austrian, Czech and English, and in a smaller number the French and Greek.

In terms of the cultural life of Slatina, significant contributions were given by two teachers, in school in Slatina, Anton Seibal and from the school in Kadinjani, Svetozar Mitrović, as well as municipal notary Stevo Šteković. The choir Soča was formed, with the most numerous Slovenes, as well as a theatre company, which prepared, except for smaller and shorter scatches, also the whole-evening programmes, with a help from the director of the Bansko pozorište (the Ban theatre) from Banjaluka. A large number of the playing orchestres was formed by the local people and when it was organized, there were dances in all of the hotels in Slatina. Cultural programmes and theatre shows were performed on the stages and in the winter period in the hotel. Musical orchestres played in the cafés, restaurants, hotels and especially in the musical pavilion, which had been known as Lusthaus by the locals, the favourite meeting point of the young people.

In 1925, first Slovene families arrive to Slatina. Local people welcomed their arrival. Slovenian families moved to Slatina in three waves and the reason for their moving to Slatina and Banjaluka (especially in the years before the World War II) was oppression in areas, which were then under the rule of Italy. Except for Slovenes, in that time, several Czech, Ukrainian, Karavlah and Russian families arrive to Slatina.

In 1929, a municipality was established in Slatina and it included, except for Slatina, 10 surrounding villages (Aleksići, Boškovići, Dovići, Jaružani, Kadinjani, Priječani, Ćetojevići i Šušnjari) and it functioned until its abolishment in July, 12th, 1955.

In the 1930s, Slatina got new spa pavilions and accommodation capacities, plumbing system (1931), power plant (around 1933), The rules of spa, the new clear water indoor spa pools (1936), the first tourist guide book Slatina Ilidža (1938), infirmary and by the decision of the Vrbaska banovina, for the permanent spa doctor is appointed respectable doctor Slavko Pišteljić.

=== World War II ===
In the Slatina Spa, county of Banjaluka, curing and bathing was forbidden for the Serbs, Jews and Roma.

In the municipality of Slatina, county of Banjaluka, catholic Anton Petelin set fire to the Serbian Orthodox Church.

=== Afterwar Period ===
The period after the World War II was marked with a stagnation in Slatina. The municipality was abolished in 1955 and during the war, many of the spa facilities and tourist points were destroyed and never again built. The devastating earthquake in 1969 additionally weakened Slatina, destroying some of the last standing old and historical buildings, very few of which remained standing and undamaged today.

The period 1982–1992 was marked with a rapid economy and tourism growth in Slatina, known as The Decade of The Redevelopment. A textile factory Slateks was opened, which, in its period of the largest success, employed 952 employees. In the Cultural Centre, there were organized dances and the cinema functioned on every Sunday. In that period, a small zoo was founded in Slatina. The Slateks factory was, one decade later, made into an elderly home and in 2017 completely closed its door.

=== 21st century ===
Slatina entered in the 21st century with solid tourist capacities, although the weakening of the tourism is visible, comparing with the Golden Age in the 1930s. Between 2013 and 2018, there was a completely new and modern spa complex opened, so the total number of the hotel beds reached 492, disposed into hotel rooms and apartments in six accommodation facilities (hotels and pavilions). The Slatina Forest Park, the new and contemporary recreation area, opened in 2021, is the biggest in Slatina, with an area of 35,73 ha. With the arrival of the new decades of the 21st century, tourism in Slatina, as well as the spa resort itself, is revitalising and becoming one of the leading ones of its sort in the Republic of Srpska.

== Church ==
Slatina is famous also after the Old Church, which is just 1.8 km away from the centre of the spa resort. The legend says the church appeared on the hill itself, in time of the Ottoman rule. Every year for Orthodox Christmas and Easter, hunderts of believers gather there. Church was built of wood and is small, so you have to bend down to enter the church.

The church was built around 1750, and was consecrated by Patriarch Arsenije IV.

== Tourism ==
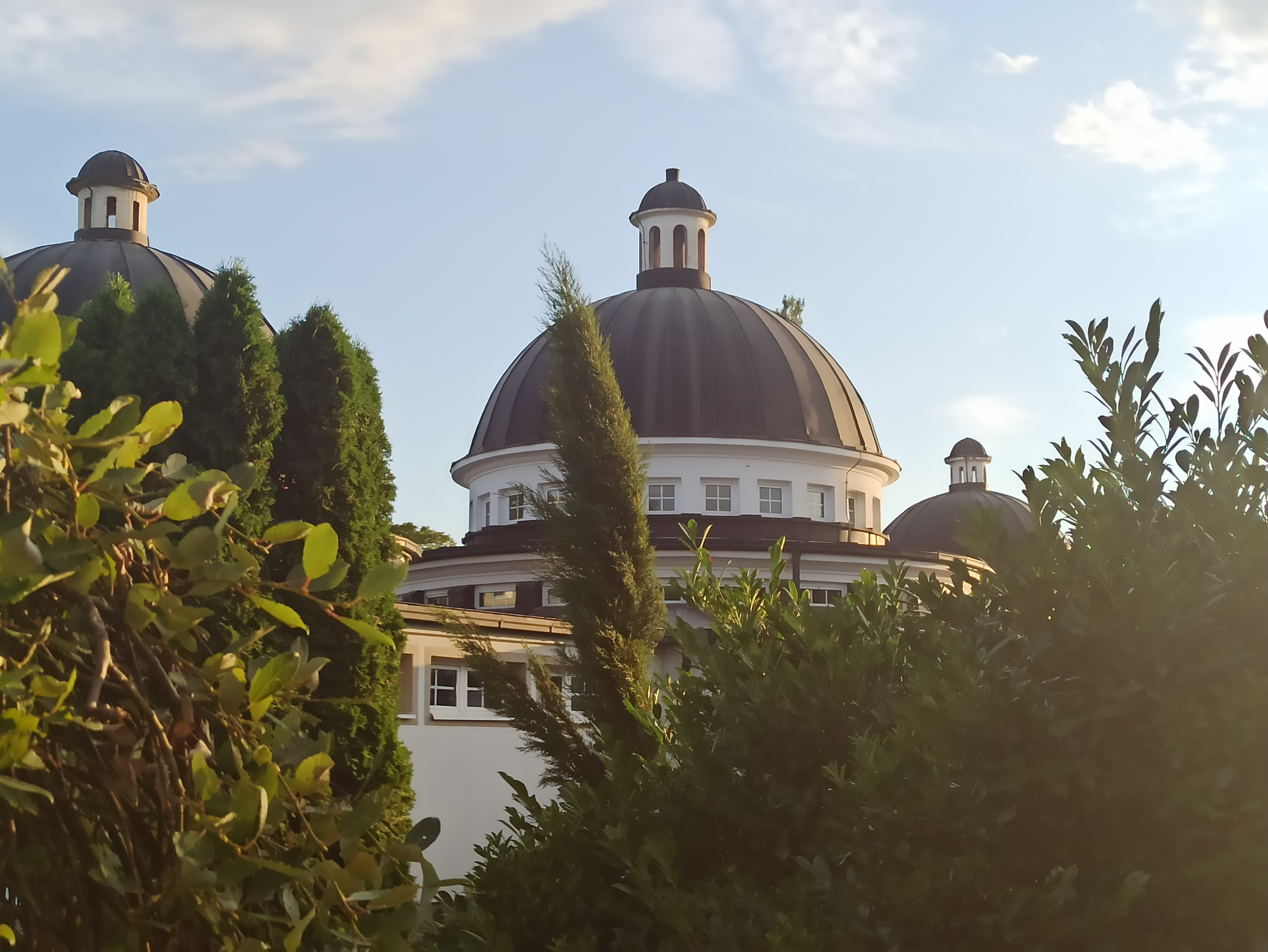
The main spa facility, The Mineral Bath

Slatina has a reputation of a tourist place and spa resort, since its establishment in the 1870s and is considered one of the best health resorts for the rheumatism in the Southeast Europe. The place is characterized by unpolluted nature, numerous picnic areas and recreation zones, of which the biggest and the most famous is The Slatina Forest Park.

During its history, tourism was, beside the agriculture, the mainstay of the economy of Slatina and it has been rapidly developing after the establishment of the Municipality of Slatina, in 1929. In the year 1936, Slatina was visited by more than 3,500 tourists, of which a significant number was from the Central and Western Europe and Slatina was classified among the most visited tourist destinations of Vrbaska banovina. Tourism and attendance growed, so that in 1938, Slatina was visited by 5,000 tourists and in 1939 6,500 tourists.

The oldest and most famous event in Slatina is Petrovdanski zbor (St. Peter's Day Gathering), which represents a gathering of all of the residents of the Slatina Region and tourists, because of the St. Patron's Day (Slava) of the Orthodox Church in Slatina and the populated place of Slatina.

Every summer there is a manifestation Dan jagode (The Strawberry Day), which gathers hunderts of young people, who compete in different disciplines.

In honor of Slovenes who migrated to Slatina in the period between the two world wars, there is Slovenian Day, organized in June.

== Demographics ==
Nationality	1991.	1981.	1971.	1961.
Serbs	1.031 (89.41%)	1.049 (88.89%)	1.103 (92.84%)	
Yugoslavs	83 (7.19%)	60 (5.08%)	1 (0.08%)	
Croats	9 (0.78%)	10 (0.84%)	18 (1.51%)	
Muslims	1 (0.08%)	2 (0.16%)	4 (0.33%)	
Other and unknown	29 (2.51%)	59 (5.00%)	62 (5.21%)	
Total	1.153	1.180	1.188	

Numbers of 1879 and 1885 census refer also to the surrounding villages, 1931 census refer to Slatina as a whole municipality.

Year	Population
1879	985
1885	1,140
1895	301
1900	289
1910	405
1921	492
1931	4,861
1948	930
1953	1,054
1961	1,139
1971	1,188
1981	1,180
1991	1,169
2013	1,344

== See also ==
- Spa
- Spa town
- Mineral spa
- Mineral spring
- Republic of Srpska
- Tourism in Bosnia and Herzegovina
