= Wulai Hot Spring =

Hot spring in Wulai, New Taipei, Taiwan

- 烏來溫泉
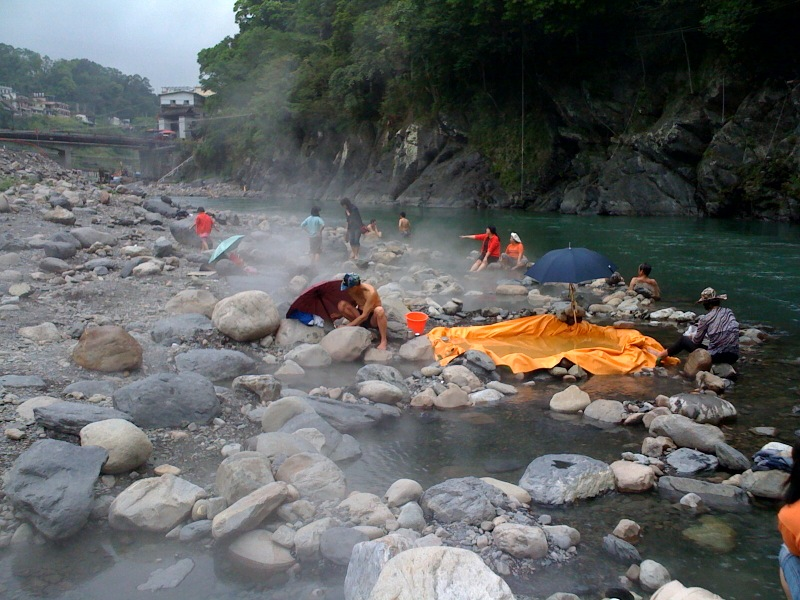

- Location within Taiwan
- Interactive map of Wulai Hot Spring
- Location: Wulai, New Taipei, Taiwan
- Coordinates: 24°51′48.3″N 121°33′01.2″E
- Type: hot spring
- Temperature: 80 °C (176 °F)

The Wulai Hot Spring (traditional Chinese: 烏來溫泉; simplified Chinese: 乌来温泉; pinyin: Wūlái Wēnquán) is a hot spring in Wulai District, New Taipei, Taiwan.

== Name ==
The name Wulai comes from Atayal language “Ulay” which means “streaming water” and is also the namesake of the district.

== Geology ==
The hot spring town situates in the Xueshan Range, and spreads out around the confluence of the Tonghou River and the Nanshi River. The water of the hot spring is clear and odorless with a temperature up to 80 °C. Two types of hot springs exist in the area, which are those in hotels and resorts and also the open air ones along the Nanshi River banks. While many of them offer a set course with meals, there are also some spas that require guests to wear bathing suits.

On the left bank of the Nanshi River, there was a free open-air bath with bathing suits on, but it was removed by the New Taipei City Government on May 18, 2017, due to a violation of the Water Conservation Law.

== Transportation ==
The hot spring is accessible by bus 849 from Xindian Station of Taipei Metro.

== See also ==
- List of tourist attractions in Taiwan
- Taiwanese hot springs
