= Roy Cizek =

American inventor (1943–1993)

Roy R. Cizek
- Born: January 29, 1943; Terre Haute, Indiana
- Died: April 12, 1993 (aged 50); Torrance, California
- Education: Indiana University
- Occupations: Inventor, hi-fi designer, manufacturer

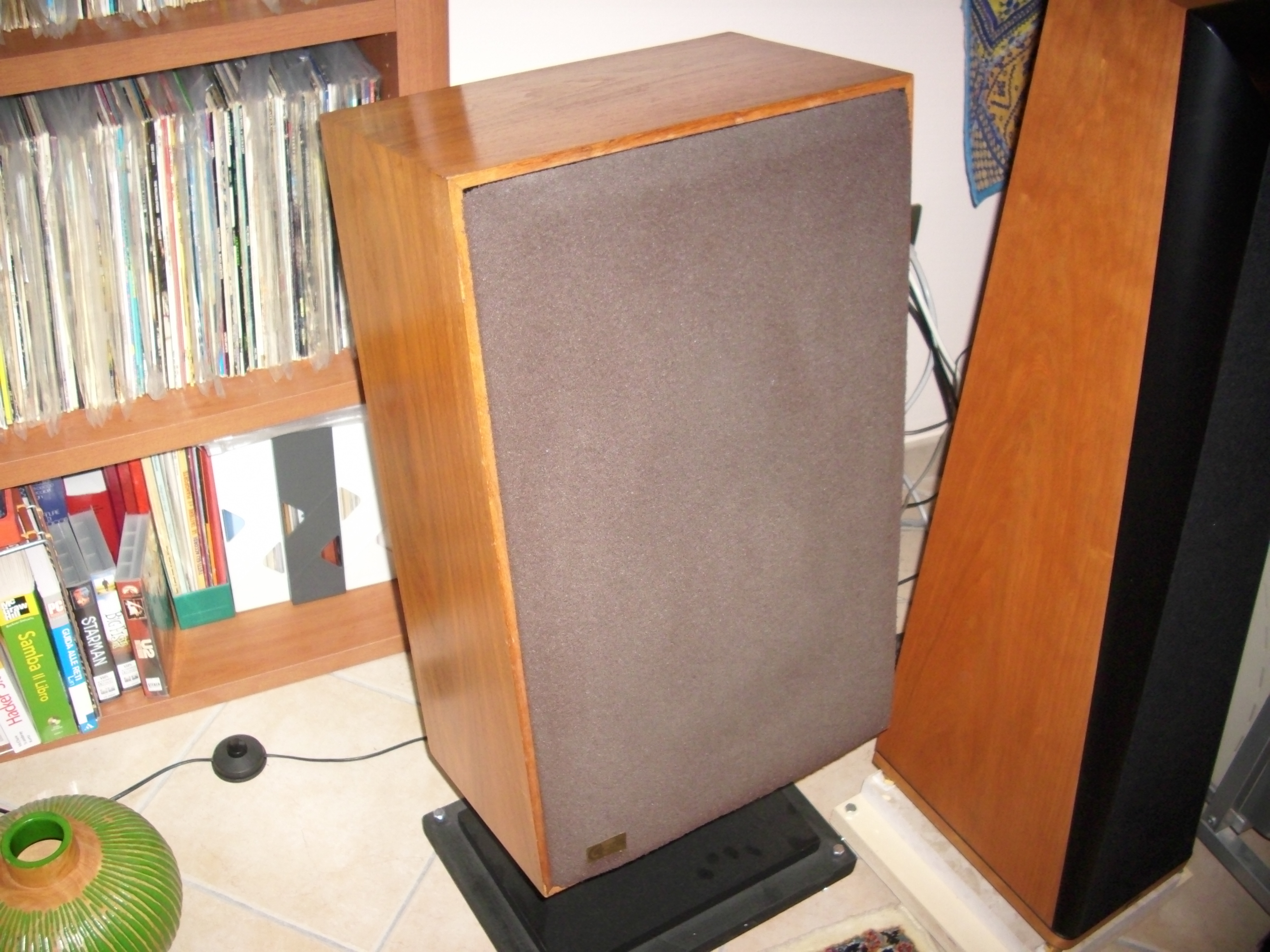
The Cizek Model One with a foam grid and its own stand

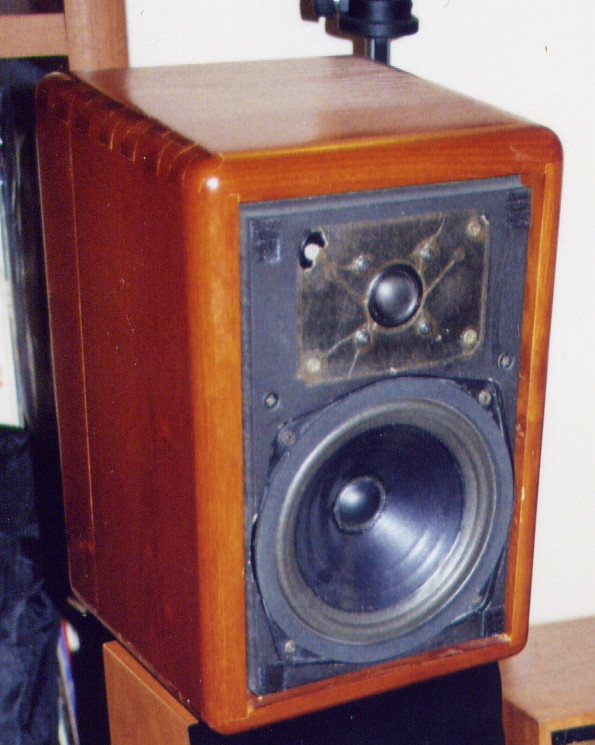
Cizek KA-1 Classic (Italian version built by Franco Serblin)

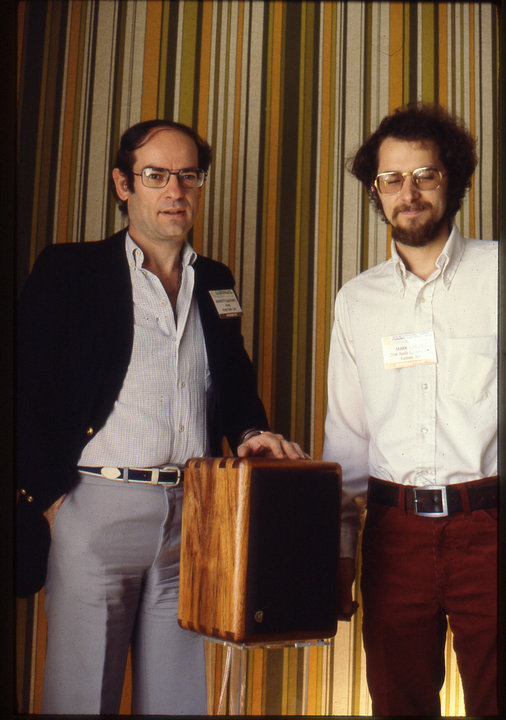
Giancarlo Bonetti (Cizek importer in Italy) at Andover with Mark Gailus, Cizek's young collaborator and inventor of the KA-1 Classic.

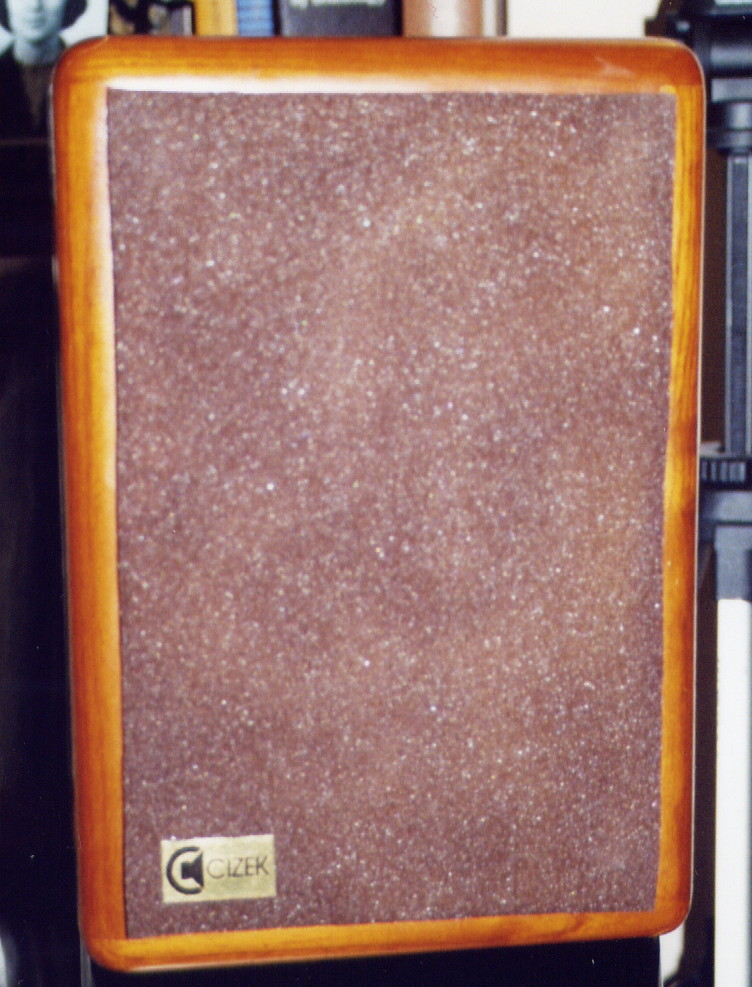
Cizek KA-1 Classic with a foam grid

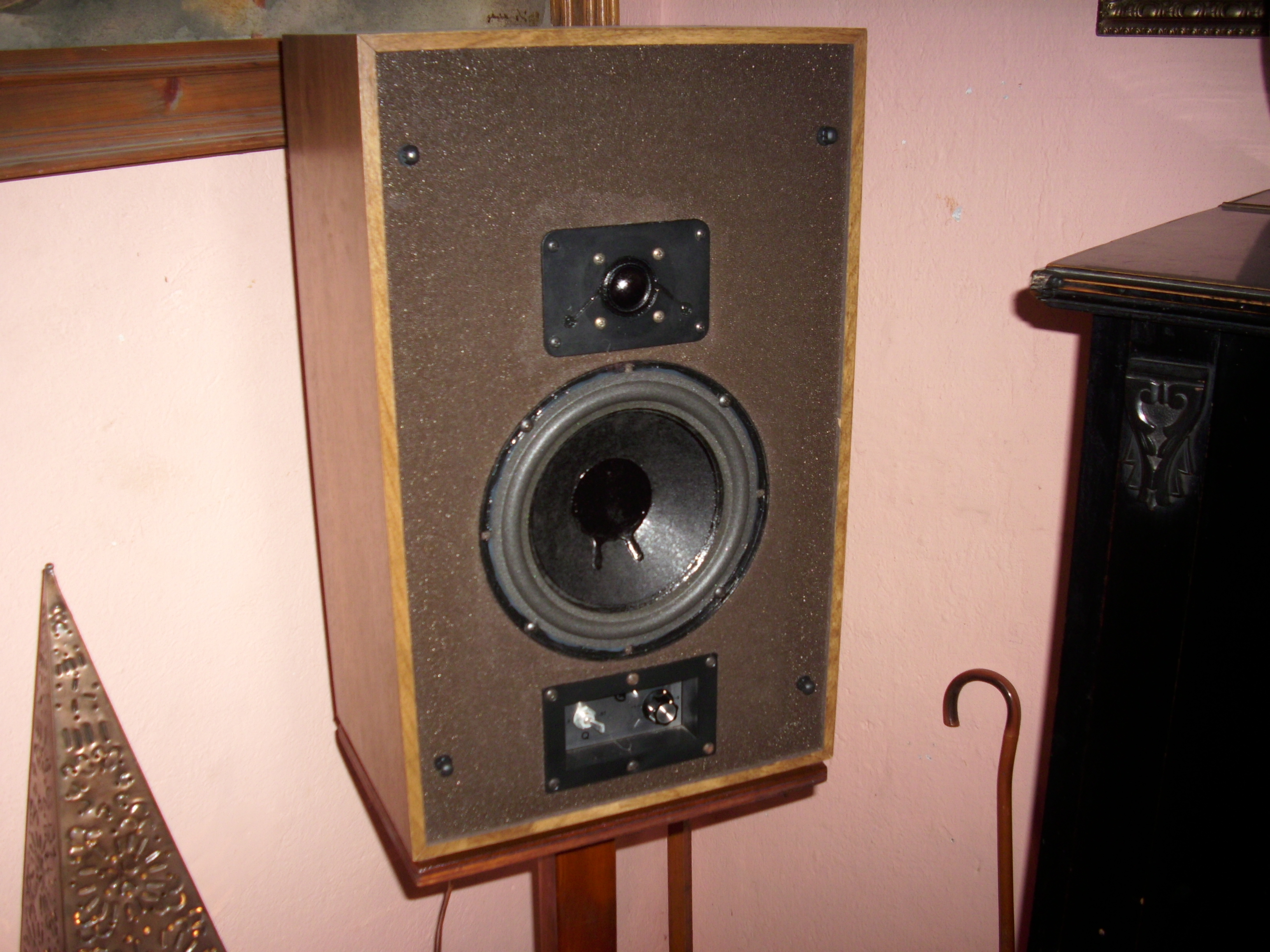
Cizek Model 2

Fred Roy Cizek (January 29, 1943 – April 12, 1993) was an American inventor, hi-fi designer, and manufacturer.

As the founder of CIZEK Audio System in Andover, Massachusetts, he became fairly well known in the audiophile world, especially in Italy, during the late 1970s for his company's high-quality speakers. Before starting his own business, Cizek worked for historical hi-fi manufacturers, such as Acoustic Research, JBL, and Altec Lansing. Blind since the age of three, he developed a special sensitivity for music reproduction and patented a special crossover to ensure a flat impedance curve to his speakers.

== Biography ==
=== Early life ===
Fred Roy Cizek was born on January 29, 1943, in Terre Haute, Indiana, to Carl Fred Cizek (1918–2005) and Florence Cizek (1921–1991).

Cizek became blind as a child following a severe burn, which also caused chronic leg ulcers that has persisted throughout his life and never adequately healed. His severe disabilities probably contributed to the development of his fine ear for music and sounds. He grew up in Bloomington, Indiana, where he produced his first speaker. His original speakers were handcrafted prototypes. According to the testimony of Ron Nadeau, a close friend who knew him at Indiana University in Bloomington, Roy was a man of great generosity, with fine skills in woodwork. He built loudspeakers for the university's students in exchange for very little money. This "philosophy" inspired his whole future production: building low-cost quality speakers.

=== CIZEK Audio System ===
In the 1970s, he moved to Cambridge, Massachusetts, with his wife Mary Francis Ramsey and their sons Fred, Carl, and Mitchell. He worked there as a consultant for Acoustic Research. A few years later, he founded the company that bore his name, CIZEK Audio System, in Andover.

Cizek produced his most successful product, The Cizek Model One, in 1976. The speaker introduced the concept of flat impedance module, with only one peak at the resonance frequency achieved by a particular crossover. It used innovative solutions as the upward inclination of the baffle (obtained with the special stands) and the use of damping material (foam) in the baffle, in order to reduce the diffraction phenomena.

The Cizek Model One also had a switch that allowed its operator to choose the damping factor (Q factor) of the low frequencies between 0.6 and 1.0; this allowed people to listen to music with dry and braked low (Q = 0.6) or slightly emphasized low (Q = 1.0). Cizek controlled all Model One production to ensure it met his standards. Being blind, he could not see the measurement, but he used a special trick: he placed the index and middle fingers so that the needle readout instrument could touch his fingers, which established the margin of tolerance. If the needle touched a finger, the speaker was discarded.

In April 1978, the Model One was featured in the 54th issue of Italian magazine Stereoplay.

Two other speaker models were subsequently produced: The Cizek Model 2 and 3, in addition to a stereo subwoofer called MG 27 with two woofers in a double closed box. The latter, together with the Model 3, was the subject of another article in Stereoplay. The article talked about the speaker's ability to reproduce sounds between 27 and 700 Hertz in a range of ± 1 dB and compared the Model 3 and MG 27, which was the best existing speaker at the time.

A few years later, the KA-1 Classic mini-monitor was produced, which was entirely built from koa wood. The KA-1 could be combined with the KA-20 subwoofer to create a System Classic 20. This combination was the subject of a trial in the 113th issue of Italian magazine Suono in June 1982. The magazine commented on its sound quality, saying that it was "one of the best speakers [of the time]".

Another speaker built by Cizek was the Sound Window, a flat and square wall speaker with rounded edges, and it was small to medium in size.

=== Later life ===
In the 1980s, Cizek sold his company to Sheldon Feinstein, who became the president of CIZEK Audio System. However, Feinstein would later die of a heart attack on his way to work. The company never recovered after this event. The company's new president was a poor organizer, preferring to personally store all the addresses and contacts of suppliers and customers. After the death of Feinstein, 30% of the company was taken over by Giancarlo Bonetti, an Italian importer of Cizek's brand in the 1970s and 1980s. For a short period, the Classic series of Cizek speakers (the KA-1, KA-20, and KA-18) were built in Italy. They were commissioned by Bonetti's company, Esoteric, for Franco Serblin, a hi-fi designer. In 1983, Serblin founded Sonus Faber, an Italian manufacturer of loudspeakers. In fact, many Sonus Faber speakers aesthetically recall the Cizek KA-1 Classic.

Cizek continued to produce speakers throughout the 1980s and early 1990s through a new company, High Tech Aspirin by Cizek, with his third wife in Torrance, California. These speakers were presented in at least two editions of the Consumer Electronics Show in Las Vegas.

=== Death and legacy ===
Cizek died on April 12, 1993, in Torrance. His two stepdaughters created a scholarship in his name at the Indiana School for the Blind and Visually Impaired in 2002.

The MG 27 subwoofer, together with 2 Quad electrostatic speakers, is considered a milestone in speaker quality. It is still used for comparison of modern speakers by audio magazine Stereophile.
