= Čížkov (Plzeň-South District) =

- Municipality
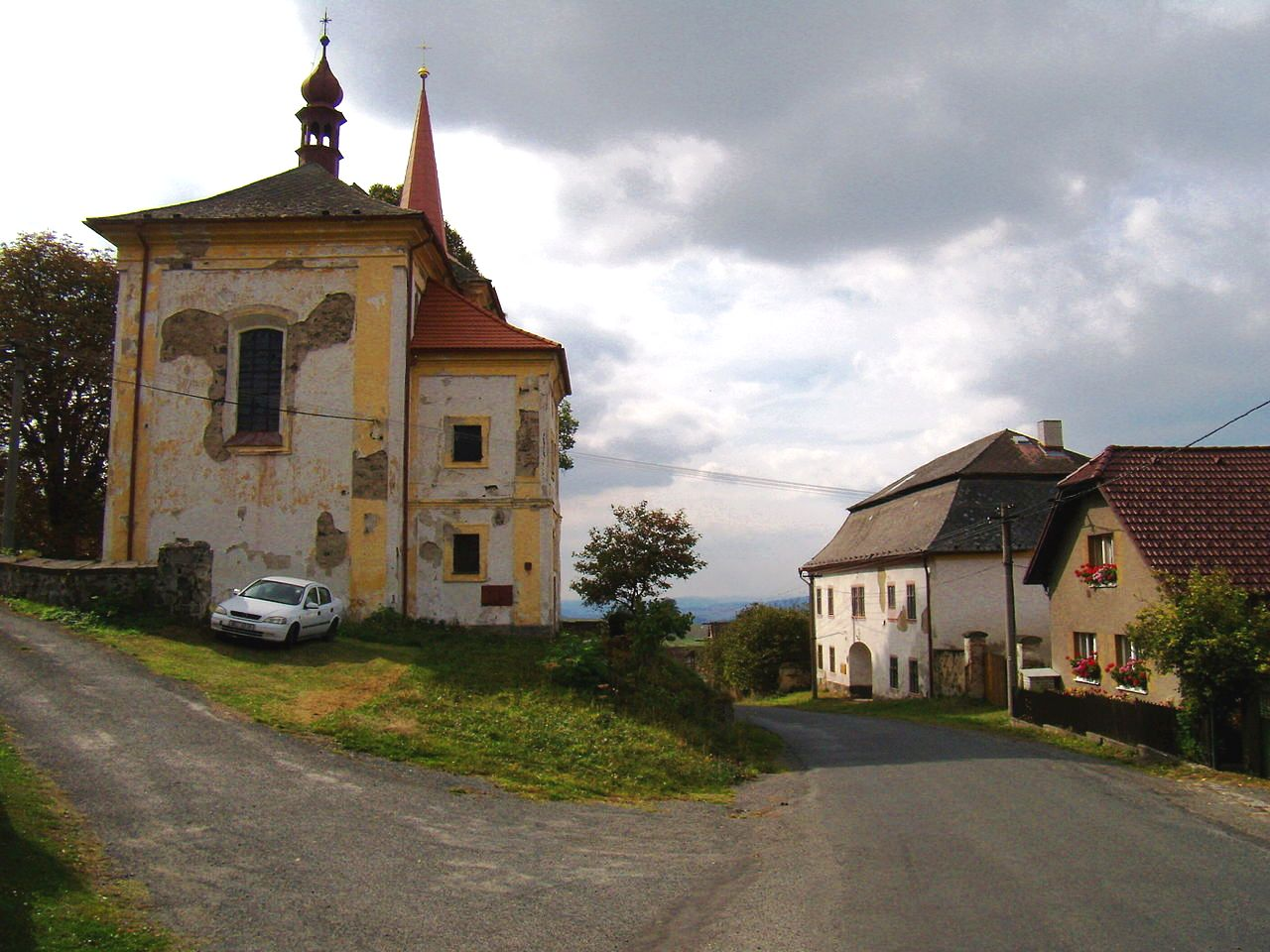
- Church of Saint John the Baptist and rectory

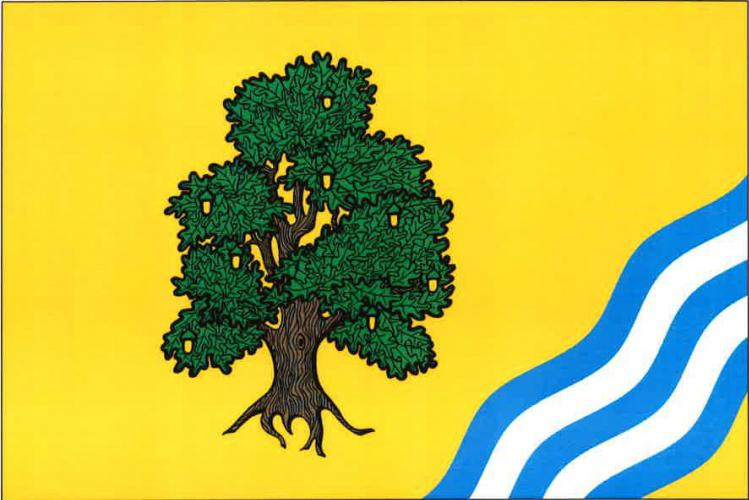
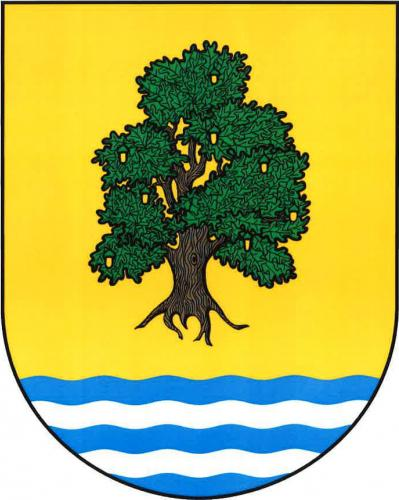
- Flag Coat of arms

- Location in the Czech Republic
- Coordinates: 49°32′26″N 13°41′0″E
- Country: Czech Republic
- Region: Plzeň
- District: Plzeň-South
- First mentioned: 1237

Area
  - Total: 49.12 km^{2} (18.97 sq mi)
- Elevation: 578 m (1,896 ft)

Population (2026-01-01)
  - Total: 676
  - Density: 13.8/km^{2} (35.6/sq mi)
- Time zone: UTC+1 (CET)
  - Summer (DST): UTC+2 (CEST)
- Postal codes: 335 01, 335 63, 335 64
- Website: www.obec-cizkov.cz

Čížkov is a municipality and village in Plzeň-South District in the Plzeň Region of the Czech Republic. It has about 700 inhabitants.

Čížkov lies approximately 32 kilometres (20 mi) south-east of Plzeň and 81 km (50 mi) south-west of Prague.

== Administrative division ==
Čížkov consists of eight municipal parts (in brackets population according to the 2021 census):

- Čížkov (141)
- Čečovice (135)
- Chynín (50)
- Liškov (37)
- Měrčín (19)
- Přešín (90)
- Zahrádka (42)
- Železný Újezd (130)

== Demographics ==
Historical population
Year	Pop.	±%
1869	2,734	—
1880	2,894	+5.9%
1890	2,686	−7.2%
1900	2,510	−6.6%
1910	2,443	−2.7%
1921	2,345	−4.0%
1930	2,088	−11.0%
1950	1,471	−29.5%
1961	1,411	−4.1%
1970	1,046	−25.9%
1980	896	−14.3%
1991	754	−15.8%
2001	634	−15.9%
2011	666	+5.0%
2021	644	−3.3%
Source: Censuses
