= Aleksandr Chizh (footballer, born 2002) =

Belarusian footballer

Personal information
- Date of birth: 8 March 2002 (age 24)
- Place of birth: Minsk, Belarus
- Position: Forward

Team information
- Current team: Soligorsk
- Number: 3

Youth career
- 2016–2019: FShM Minsk

Senior career*
Years	Team	Apps	(Gls)
2020	Smolevichi	2	(0)
2021	Shakhtyor Petrikov	25	(1)
2022	Maxline Rogachev	6	(0)
2022	Osipovichi	12	(0)
2023	Slonim-2017	16	(2)
2023	Baranovichi	17	(0)
2024–2026	Slonim-2017	66	(1)
2026–	Soligorsk	3	(0)
- * Club domestic league appearances and goals as of 21 August 2026

Aleksandr Chizh (Belarusian: Аляксандр Чыж; Russian: Александр Чиж; born 8 March 2002) is a Belarusian professional footballer who plays for Soligorsk.
