= Václav Čížek =

Czech ice hockey player

- Born: July 30, 1989 (age 37) Buranovice, Czechoslovakia
- Height: 6 ft 1 in (185 cm)
- Weight: 194 lb (88 kg; 13 st 12 lb)
- Position: Defence
- Shoots: Left
- Tipsport Liga team Former teams: HC Košice; BK Mladá Boleslav; HC '05 Banská Bystrica; HC Nové Zámky; MsHK Žilina
- Playing career: 2008–present

Václav Čížek (born July 30, 1989) is a Czech professional ice hockey defenceman currently playing for HC Košice of the Tipsport Liga.

Čižek played with BK Mladá Boleslav in the Czech Extraliga between 2008 and 2012. He joined HC '05 Banská Bystrica of the Tipsport Liga on October 31, 2014.
