= Božejov =

- Market town
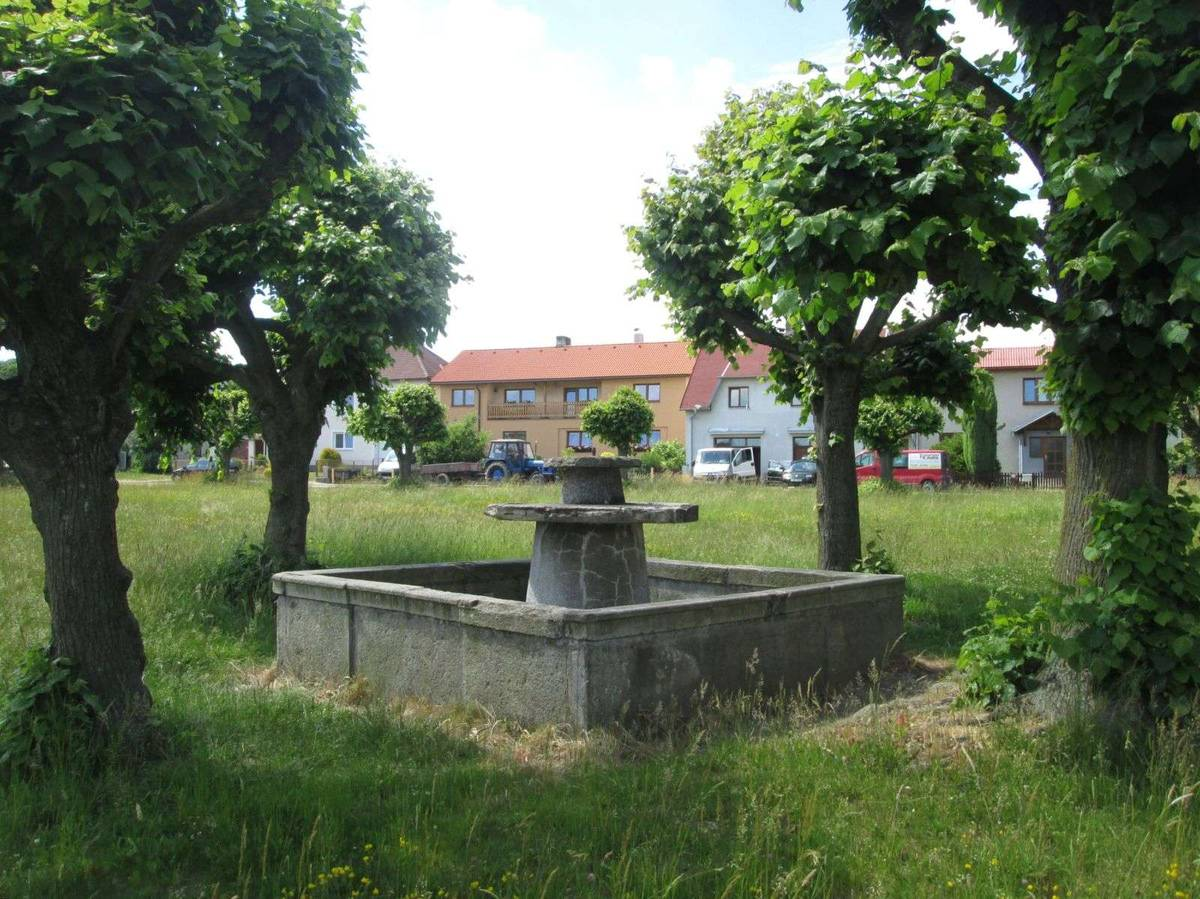
- Centre of Božejov

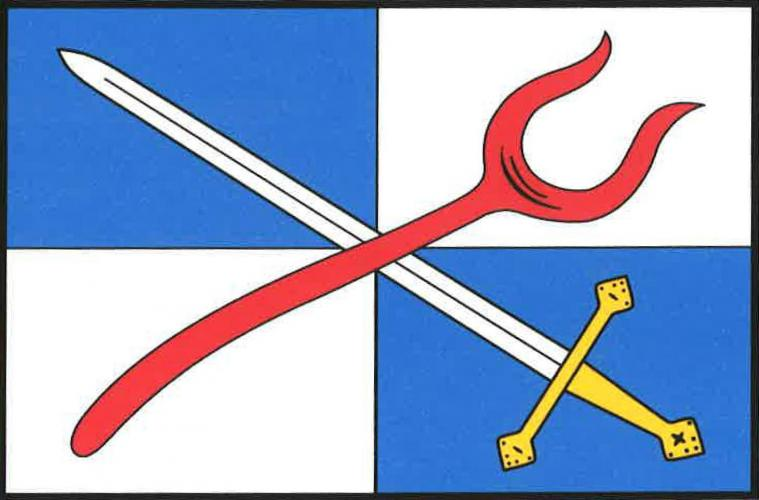
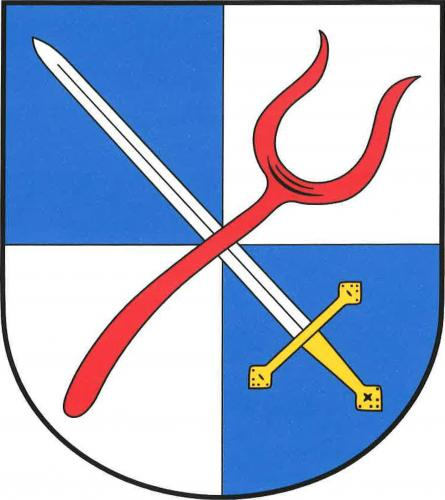
- Flag Coat of arms

- Location in the Czech Republic
- Coordinates: 49°21′44″N 15°9′21″E
- Country: Czech Republic
- Region: Vysočina
- District: Pelhřimov
- First mentioned: 1352

Area
  - Total: 9.32 km^{2} (3.60 sq mi)
- Elevation: 602 m (1,975 ft)

Population (2026-01-01)
  - Total: 624
  - Density: 67.0/km^{2} (173/sq mi)
- Time zone: UTC+1 (CET)
  - Summer (DST): UTC+2 (CEST)
- Postal code: 394 61
- Website: www.bozejov.cz

Božejov (Czech pronunciation: [ˈboʒɛjof]) is a market town in Pelhřimov District in the Vysočina Region of the Czech Republic. It has about 600 inhabitants.

== Administrative division ==
Božejov consists of two municipal parts (in brackets population according to the 2021 census):

- Božejov (611)
- Nová Ves (20)

== Etymology ==
The name is derived from the personal name Božej, meaning "Božej's (court)".

== Geography ==
Božejov is located about 9 kilometres (6 mi) southwest of Pelhřimov and 30 km (19 mi) west of Jihlava. It lies in the Křemešník Highlands. The highest point is the Troják hill at 704 m (2,310 ft) above sea level. The upper course of the Želivka River (called the Hejlovka) flows along the northwestern municipal border. The area is rich in small fishponds and streams.

== History ==
The first written mention of Božejov is from 1352, however, the settlement was probably established before 1200. Between 1680 and 1837, the Voračiský of Paběnice family owned Božejov and the market town coat of arms was derived from them.

== Demographics ==
Historical population

Year	Pop.	±%
1869	768	—
1880	758	−1.3%
1890	724	−4.5%
1900	702	−3.0%
1910	712	+1.4%

Year	Pop.	±%
1921	659	−7.4%
1930	647	−1.8%
1950	519	−19.8%
1961	522	+0.6%
1970	505	−3.3%

Year	Pop.	±%
1980	618	+22.4%
1991	652	+5.5%
2001	654	+0.3%
2011	634	−3.1%
2021	631	−0.5%

Source: Censuses

== Transport ==
The I/34 road (part of the European route E551, the section from Jindřichův Hradec to Pelhřimov) runs through the municipal territory.

== Sights ==
The main landmark of Božejov is the Church of Saint George. It is a large early Baroque building with a medieval core. The tower dates from 1642.

== Notable people ==
- Lukáš Masopust (born 1993), footballer
