= Adam Číž =

Czech basketball player

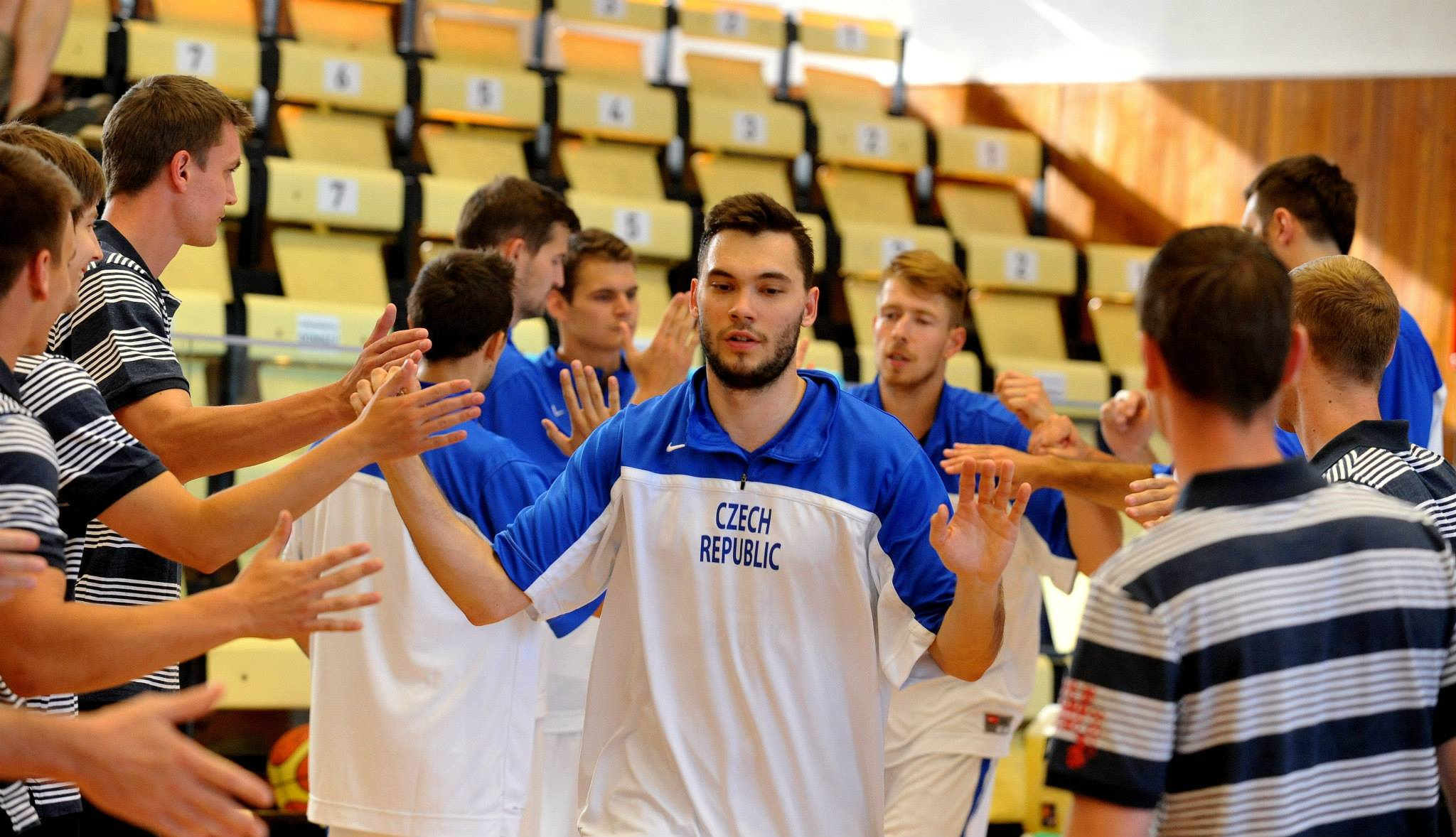

Adam Číž (born 23 August 1991, in Ostrava, Czech Republic) is a Czech professional basketball player for the BK NH Ostrava and he starts at the point guard position. Adam is a longtime captain of his team, which plays in the highest competition in the Czech Republic named Kooperativa NBL. Thanks to his nickname "Olovo" (or "the Lead") and his notorious toughness, he was able to gain respect through the basketball world.

== Career ==
Adam is also a member of the extended team of the Czech republic national basketball team.

In the year 2015/2016, in the regular season he averaged 35,4 minutes, 14.0 points, 3.7 rebounds, 4.7 assists and effectivity 14.6 per game and he was also the most valuable player of his team.
