= Tom Czyz =

American law enforcement officer and security company executive

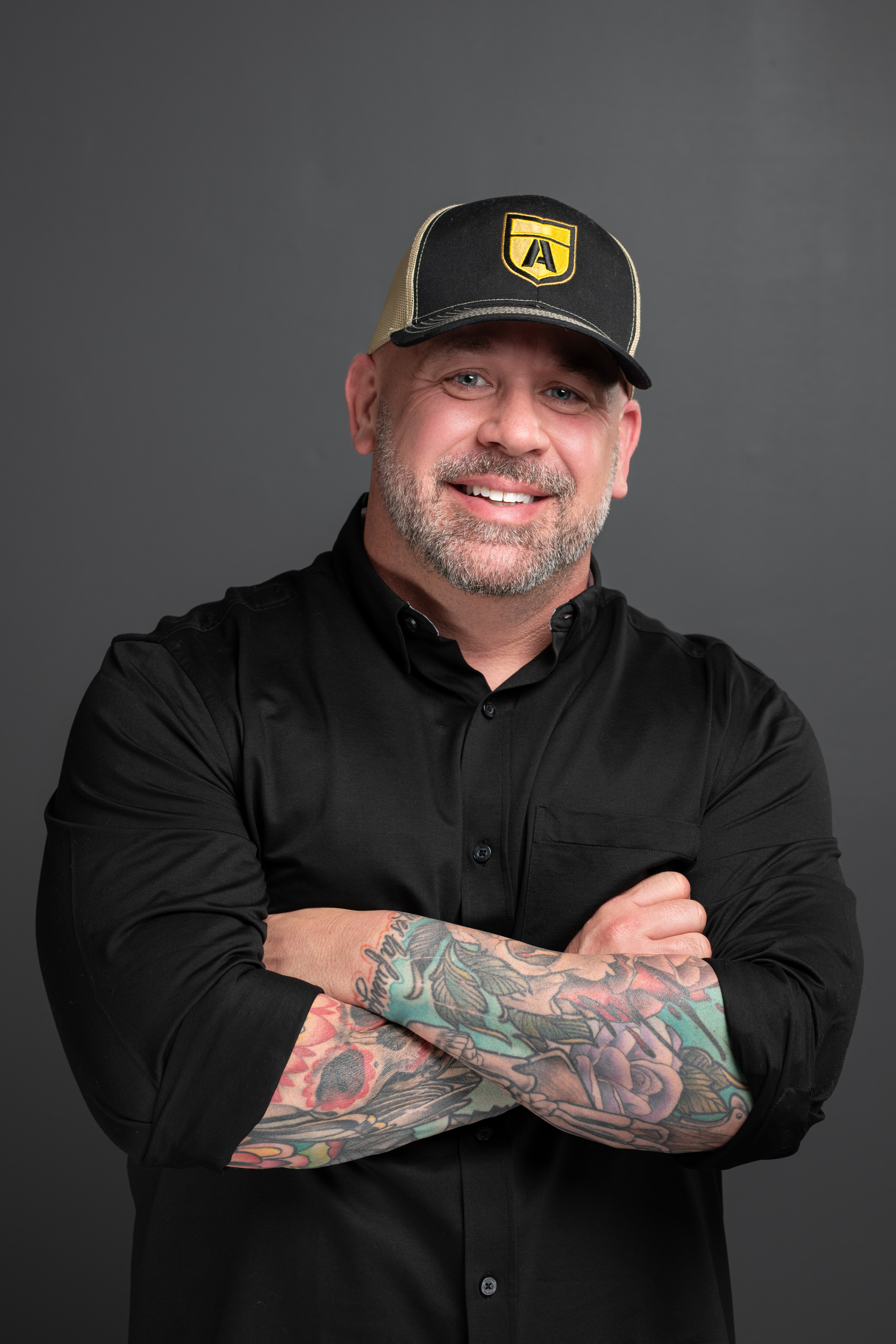
- Born: Thomas Czyz; Syracuse, New York
- Occupations: Active shooter expert, SWAT team operator
- Known for: Founder and CEO of Armoured One
- Notable work: Staying One Step Ahead: Ending the Story of Active Shooter in America’s Schools (2024)
- Spouse: Maria Czyz
- Parents: Randy Czyz (father); Maryann Czyz (mother)
- Website: www.armouredone.com

Tom Czyz is an American former homicide detective, police officer, and SWAT team operator. He is the founder and chief executive officer of Armoured One, a safety and security company with its focuses on active shooter training, security assessments, security glass and security film. He is an active shooter expert who advises and conducts training programs for teachers and administrators at schools K-12, universities and businesses across the country. Tom is the son of Pastor Randy and Maryann Czyz who pastor Word of Life Assembly of God in Baldwinsville, New York.

== Early life ==
Tom was born in Syracuse, New York and currently lives in Baldwinsville. He is a graduate of Baker High School in Baldwinsville, NY. Tom grew up in downstate NY in Highland Falls. Tom's father was a chaplain at West Point, NY for the Army.

== Career ==
Tom started his career as a police office for the Baldwinsville Police Department. In 2009 he transferred to the Onondaga County Sheriff's Department as a major crimes detective and SWAT Team Operator. He served for a total 18 years before medical retiring from an injury on duty. He is now a retired major crimes detective and SWAT Team operator. On December 14, 2012, Tom founded Armoured One with a team of active shooter experts from SWAT Team members, elite military personnel, and federal agents which include the Secret Service, FBI and Homeland Security. Tom and his team evaluates the security of schools, sells ASTM F3561 Shooter Attack Certified glass and window film plus he delivers active shooter keynote speeches and training seminars. The idea of Armoured One came up when he realized after the Sandy Hook attack in 2012 that he could not keep his own kids safe while they were at school.

His team travels across the country and teaches faculty and staff on what to do in the event of a school shooting.

== Books ==
In September 2024, Tom published the book Staying One Step Ahead: Ending the Story of Active Shooter in America’s Schools, a guide aimed at improving school safety and response protocols. Tom brings extensive experience from the world of active shootings, including independent investigations at over sixty school shootings since 2012. In the book, he shares the unvarnished truth about how schools and law enforcement can protect children and staff.

Czyz, Tom (September 4, 2024). Staying One Step Ahead: Ending the Story of Active Shooter in America's Schools. Advantage Media Group. ISBN 979-8891880436.

== See also ==
- John P. St. John (police officer)
- Detective
