= Číž =

Číž Csíz
- Municipality
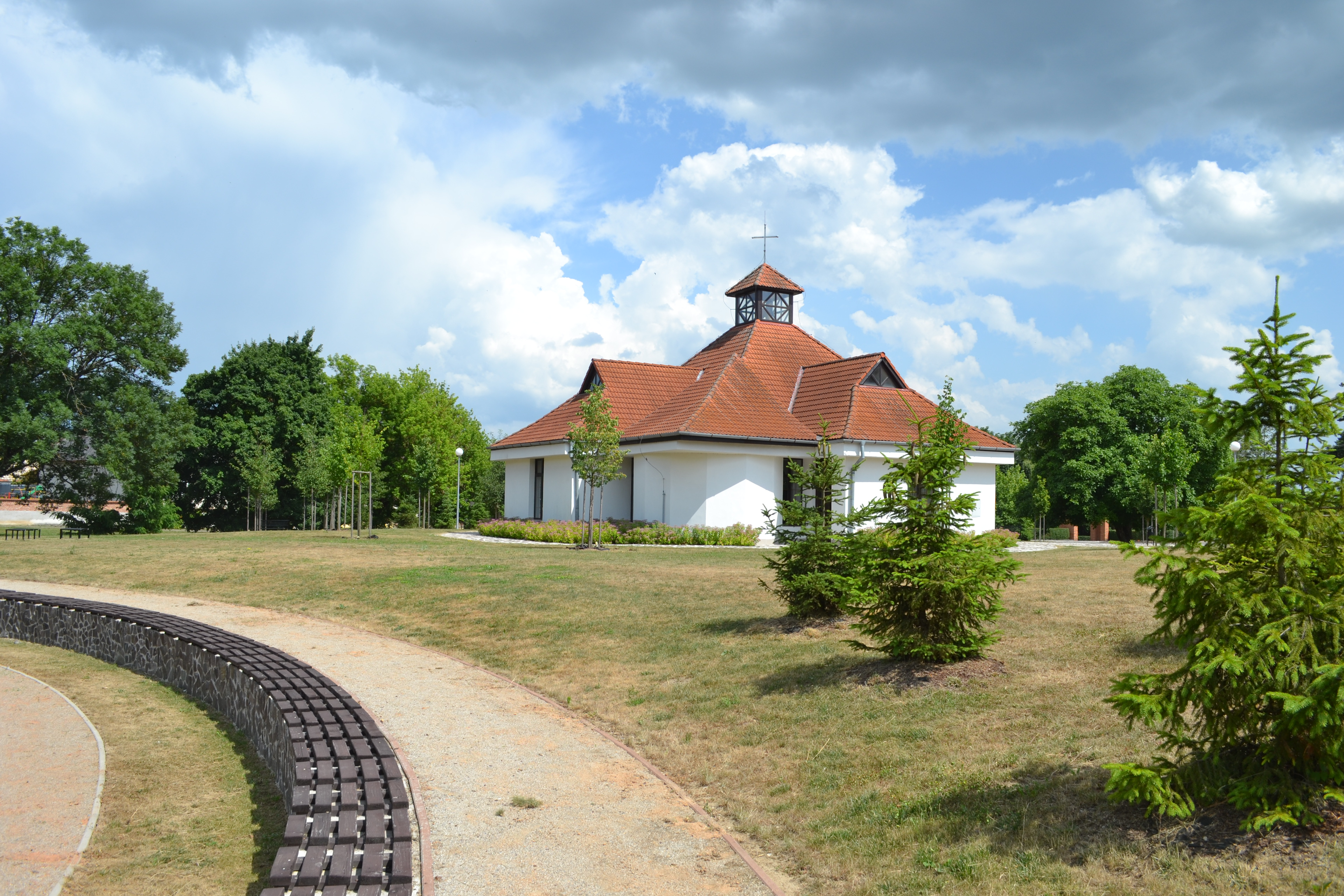
- Parish Church of St. Gorazd

- Flag Coat of arms

- Location of Číž in the Banská Bystrica Region Location of Číž in Slovakia
- Coordinates: 48.32°N 20.28°E
- Country: Slovakia
- Region: Banská Bystrica Region
- District: Rimavská Sobota District
- First mentioned: 1274

Area
  - Total: 6.14 km^{2} (2.37 sq mi)
- Elevation: 170 m (560 ft)

Population (2025)
  - Total: 685
- Time zone: UTC+1 (CET)
  - Summer (DST): UTC+2 (CEST)
- Postal code: 980 43
- Area code: +421 47
- Vehicle registration plate (until 2022): RS
- Website: www.obecciz.sk

Číž (Hungarian: Csíz) is a spa village and municipality in the Rimavská Sobota District of the Banská Bystrica Region of southern Slovakia.

== Geography ==
The municipality lies at an altitude of 170 metres (560 ft) and covers an area of 6.14 km^{2} (2.37 sq mi) (2025).

== History ==
In historical records, the village was first mentioned in 1274 (as Chyz). It first belonged to the Tukovci (Tuky) family and later to several zeman families. In 1566 and 1682, the village was destroyed by the Turks. From 1938 to 1945, Číž was occupied by Hungary under the First Vienna Award.

== Population ==
Population statistic (10 years)
Year	1995	2005	2015	2025
Count	670	707	641	685
Difference		+5.52%	−9.33%	+6.86%

Population statistic
Year	2024	2025
Count	683	685
Difference		+0.29%

It has a population of 685 people (31 December 2025).

=== Ethnicity ===
Census 2021 (1+ %)
Ethnicity	Number	Fraction
Hungarian	506	73.76%
Slovak	177	25.8%
Romani	91	13.26%
Not found out	22	3.2%
Total	686	

In year 2021 was 686 people by ethnicity 506 as Hungarian, 177 as Slovak, 91 as Romani, 22 as Not found out, 2 as German, 1 as Jewish, 1 as Czech, 1 as Russian and 1 as Other.

Note on population: The difference values of population numbers in the table "Population statistic" and in the sections "Ethnicity" & "Religion" is caused by the use of various statistical methods.

=== Religion ===
Census 2021 (1+ %)
Religion	Number	Fraction
Roman Catholic Church	308	44.9%
Calvinist Church	159	23.18%
None	156	22.74%
Evangelical Church	36	5.25%
Not found out	21	3.06%
Total	686	

In year 2021 was 686 people by religion 308 from Roman Catholic Church, 159 from Calvinist Church, 156 from None, 36 from Evangelical Church, 21 from Not found out, 1 from Jewish community, 1 from Old Catholic Church, 1 from Jehovah's Witnesses, 1 from Christian Congregations in Slovakia, 1 from Islam and 1 from Greek Catholic Church.

== Genealogical resources ==
The records for genealogical research are available at the state archive "Štátný archív in Banská Bystrica, Slovakia"

- Roman Catholic church records (births/marriages/deaths): 1740-1896 (parish B)

== See also ==
- List of municipalities and towns in Slovakia
