= List of newspapers in Tunisia =

The following list is a non-exhaustive one of physical and electronic newspapers in Tunisia:

== Printed versions ==
- Akhbar Al Joumhouria (weekly)
- Alchourouk (Arabic, daily)
- Assabah (daily)
- Assarih (Arabic, daily)
- Esshafa (daily, state-owned)
- La Presse de Tunisie (French, daily, state-owned)
- Le Maghreb (daily)
- Le Temps (daily)

== Electronic only ==
- AlKabar Plus
- Kapitalis
- Business News
- Mabapost (English, French, Arabic)
- Nawaat
- Tunibusiness
- Tunisia News
- Tunisie Numerique

== Defunct ==
- Al Amal
- L'Action Tunisienne
- Al-Hadhira
- L'Alba (Italian)
- La Dépêche tunisienne
- La Gazette d'Israël
- La Justice
- Erraï
- Es-Sabah
- Il Liberatore (Italian)
- Le Renouveau
- Le Réveil juif
- Tunis-Socialiste
- Le Tunisien

== See also ==
- Media of Tunisia
- Television in Tunisia
