= List of schools in Syria =

This is a list of primary and secondary schools in the Asian country of Syria. Tertiary schools are presented separately in the list of universities in Syria.

== Aleppo ==
Schools in the city of Aleppo include:

=== Private schools ===
- AGBU Armenian Central High School
- Al-Awdeh High School
- Al-Kalimah High School
- Al-Marefa High School
- Al-Mumayazoon High School
- Al-Shahbaa High School
- Aleppo College
- Cilician Armenian High School
- Collège des Freres Maristes
- Collège Janne d'Arc
- École Amal
- George & Matilde Salem High School
- Grtasirats Armenian High School
- Ibn Hayan High School
- International School of Aleppo
- Karen Jeppe Armenian College
- Lycée Farah Privé
- Lycée Franciscaines Missionnaires de Marie
- Lycée français d'Alep
- Lycée Immaculée Conception d'Alep
- Mechitarian School of Aleppo
- National School of Aleppo
- Shams al-Assil School
- The British Syrian School

=== State-owned schools ===
- Abd al-Rahman al-Kawakibi High School
- Al-Amin School
- Al-Hikmeh School
- Al-Kindi High School
- Al-Maʿarri High School
- Al-Mamoun High School
- Al-Mutanabbi High School
- Al-Quds High School
- Basil al-Assad High School
- Dimashq School
- Djamila Bouhired School
- Huda Shaarawi High School
- Ibn al-Baitar High School
- Ibn Sina High School
- Ibn Zaydún High School
- Ibrahim Hananu High School
- Martyrs' High School
- Mazen Dabbagh High School
- Michael Kashour School
- Musa bin Nusair School
- Nablus High School
- Orouba High School
- Zaki al-Arsuzi High School

== Rif Dimashq ==
- Syria Stars High School

=== Al-Hamah ===
Schools in the village of Al-Hamah include:

- Omar Bin Abdul Aziz School

== Damascus ==
Schools in the city of Damascus include:

- Al-Bashaer School
- Al-Rayat High School
- Al-Riyadah Alelmeyah High School
- Al-Watanieh National School
- Ahmed Asaa'd Kadek School
- Al-Awael Typical High School
- Al-Bassel High School for Outstanding Students
- Damascus Community School
- Hassan ibn Thabit School
- International Montessori School
- International School of Choueifat
- Jawdat Alhashimi Secondary School
- Little Village School
- Lycée Charles de Gaulle
- Mohamed Ahmed Gera School
- Pakistan International School of Damascus
- Saa'd Haj Ali School
- Syrian Modern School
- The Britan Syrian School
- AL Saade High School
- Dar Al Hekmah High School

== Homs ==
Schools in the city of Homs include:

- High School for Outstanding Students
- Al Ghassaniah Orthodox Private School
- Al Khairia School
- International School of Choueifat
- National Evangelical School

== Latakia ==
Schools in the city of Latakia include:

- Al Sham Oasis Private School (Arabic: واحة الشام)
- National Orthodox College (الكلية الوطنية)
- Jules Jammal High School (Arabic: جول جمال)

== Tartus ==
Schools in the city of Tartus include:

=== Private ===
- Al-Andalus Private school
- Al-Khulood Private School
- Phoenix Private School

=== State-owned schools ===
- Ibrahim Hanano Elementary

== See also ==
- Education in Syria
