= Al Amal =

Amal (with al / el definite article) means (the) Hope (Arabic: أمل) or (the) Work (Arabic: عمل) in Arabic.

Amal, al-Amal, el-Amal, or less frequently, alAmal, elAmal, Alamal, Elamal, variation, may refer to:

== Media ==
- Al Amal (Lebanon) (Arabic: العمل), a Lebanese newspaper, organ of the Phalange Party (Kataeb)
- Al Amal (Tunisia) (Arabic: العمل) a Tunisian newspaper
- Al-'Amal (Aden) (Arabic: العمل), an Aden (presently Yemen) newspaper, organ of the Aden Trade Union Congress

== Politics ==
- Al-'Amal (Egyptian party), the Egyptian Islamic Labour Party
- Al Amal (Tunisian party), a Tunisian political party

== Sports ==
- Alamal SC Atbara (Arabic: نادي الأمل الرياضي عطبره), a soccer team from Atbara, Sudan
- Al-Amal FC, a soccer team in Al-Bukayriyah, Saudi Arabia
- Al-Amal Club Stadium (Arabic: ملعب الأمل), a multiuse stadium in Al-Bukairiyah, Saudi Arabia
- Stade Al-Amal Atbara (English: Al-Amal Stadium Atbara), a multiuse stadium in Atbarah, Sudan
- Complexe Al Amal (English: Al Amal Complex), a tennis complex in Casablanca, Morocco

== Other uses ==
- École Amal (Arabic: ثانوية الأمل), a K-12 private school in Aleppo, Syria
- Farmacias El Amal, a pharmacy chain from Puerto Rico
- Al-Amal, also named Emirates Mars Mission, a Mars exploration probe

== See also ==
- Alamal (disambiguation)
- Amal (disambiguation)
- Hope (disambiguation)
- Work (disambiguation)
- Al (disambiguation)
- El (disambiguation)
