= Alamal =

Amal or el Amal or al Amal means (the) hope (أمل) or (the) work (عمل) in Arabic.

Amal, alAmal, elAmal, Alamal, Elamal, al-Amal, el-Amal, or variation, may refer to:

== Buildings ==
- Al-Amal Club Stadium, a multiuse stadium in Al-Bukairiyah, Saudi Arabia
- Stade Al-Amal Atbara, a multiuse stadium in Atbarah, Sudan
- Complexe Al Amal, a tennis complex in Casablanca, Morocco
- Al Amal Private School-Aleppo or École Amal, K-12 private school in Aleppo, Syria

== Businesses ==
- Alamal SC Atbara, a soccer team from Atbara, Sudan
- Al-Amal FC, a soccer team in Al-Bukayriyah, Saudi Arabia
- Farmacias El Amal, a pharmacy chain from Puerto Rico

== Newspapers ==
- Al Amal (Lebanon), a newspaper from Beirut, Lebanon
- Al Amal (Tunisia), a newspaper from Tunisia
- Al-'Amal (Aden), a newspaper of the Aden Trade Union Congress from Aden, Yemen

== Other uses ==
- Al-'Amal (Egyptian party), the Egyptian Islamic Labour Party
- Emirates Mars Mission, also called al Amal or Hope; a space probe

== See also ==
- Amal (disambiguation)
- Al Amal (disambiguation)
- Hope (disambiguation)
- Work (disambiguation)
- Al (disambiguation)
- El (disambiguation)
