= EMAL =

EMAL may refer to:

- Emal, an Afghani male given name
- Earl Emal, a fictional character from Seirei Gensouki: Spirit Chronicles
- Emirates Aluminum (EMAL), predecessor to Emirates Global Aluminium (EGA)
- EMAL (computer) (Polish: Elektronowa Maszyna Automatycznie Licząca, lit. 'Electronic Automatic Counting Machine'), a line of early experimental Polish computers, see XYZ (computer)

== See also ==
- The dictionary definition of e-mål at Wiktionary
- EMALS
- Email
- Amal (disambiguation)
