= La Gazette d'Israël =

La Gazette d'Israël was a Tunisian francophonic newspaper for the Jewish community, founded in October 1938 by E. Ganem in Tunis. Its editor-in-chief was Henri Emmanuel.

== History ==
=== Context ===
The weekly newspaper was created mainly to create an opposing political force against the conservative and nationalist journals Le Réveil Juif and Kadima that dominated the Jewish media sphere at that time.

It is considered as an organ of the Revisionist Zionist system in Tunisia that until the end of World War II was not really interested in the question of the Aliyah and the holy land, while focusing manly on local issues such as the learning of Hebrew within the Tunisian community, the socio-economic situation of the Jewish district in the medina of Tunis, or the rights of the Jewish people as Tunisian citizens.

The last issue of La Gazette d'Israël was published in 1951.

=== Directors ===
The journal was managed by:

- David Boccara
- Raymond Cohen
- Victor Haouzi
- André Scemmama

== La Gazette d'Israël in numbers ==
Depending on the issue, the journal's number of pages varied between two and four.

Between 1938 (year of creation) and July 1939, 2000 copies were printed. Between December 1945 and September 1951, 15000 copies were published.

== See also ==
- La Justice
- Le Réveil Juif
