= Oulad Aissa, Tunisia =

Mountainous region of Tunisia, North Africa

Coordinates: 36°32′12″N 10°13′35″E

Oulad Aissa, Tunisia is a place in Tunisia, North Africa that is located at 36°32'12.0"N 10°13'35.0"E. It is north of Zaghouan, and 20 km south of Tunis. The area is mountainous.
