= Television in Tunisia =

Television in Tunisia is predominantly accessed via free-to-air satellite and digital terrestrial television (TNT). The state broadcaster, Télévision Tunisienne (created in 2007 following the split of the former ERTT), operates three public channels: El Watania 1, El Watania 2, and Watania Sports. Following the 2011 revolution, the television sector liberalized significantly, leading to the launch of numerous private commercial and associative channels.

== History ==
Television was officially introduced to Tunisia on 31 May 1966, with the launch of state-owned Radio-Télévision Tunisienne (now El Watania 1), broadcast from its first transmitter in Djebel Zaghouan. The service originally broadcast in both Arabic and French. By 1971, terrestrial television coverage reached all of Tunisia.

A second public channel, Canal 21 (later rebranded as El Watania 2), launched in November 1994. Tunisia's first private channel, Hannibal TV, began broadcasting in February 2005, followed by Nessma TV in 2007. In April 2020, Télévision Tunisienne temporarily operated an educational channel, El Watania 3, during the COVID-19 pandemic, and in March 2026 it launched the public sports channel Watania Sports.

== Major channels ==
=== Public (Télévision Tunisienne) ===
- El Watania 1 (generalist, news, sports)
- El Watania 2 (cultural, drama, regional programming)
- Watania Sports (sports; launched March 2026)

=== Private ===
- El Hiwar El Tounsi
- Attessia TV
- Nessma El Jadida
- Carthage+
- Hannibal TV
- Tunisna TV
- Telvza TV
- Al Janoubia TV
- Al Insen TV
- Jawhara TV
- M Tunisia
- Zitouna TV (unlicensed in Tunisia; broadcasts from abroad)

== Most-viewed channels ==
Historical viewing shares from March 2015 (prior to the launch of Attessia TV and Carthage+):

Position	Channel	Owner / Group	Share of total viewing (%)
1	El Hiwar El Tounsi	Asma Fehri	26.7%
2	Nessma TV	Karoui & Karoui World	18.4%
3	El Watania 1	Télévision Tunisienne	15.6%
4	Hannibal TV	Tarek Kadada	8.1%
5	El Watania 2	Télévision Tunisienne	7.8%

== See also ==
- Media of Tunisia
- List of newspapers in Tunisia
