= Zaghouan Aqueduct =

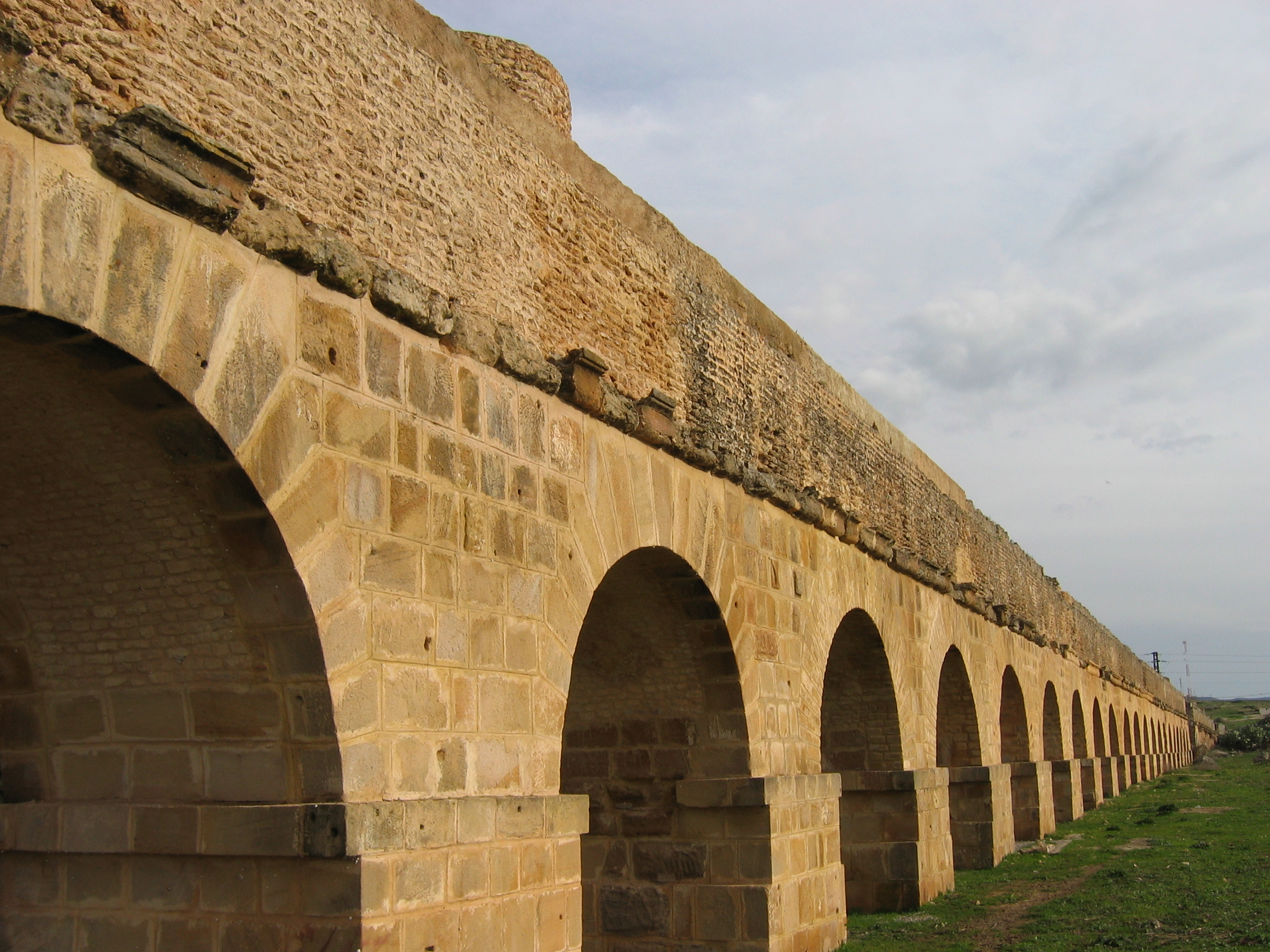
- Coordinates: 36°36′57.8″N 10°08′3.1″E
- Begins: Zaghouan
- Ends: Carthage (Tunis)

Characteristics
- Total length: 132 km (82 mi)

History
- Construction start: First half of 2nd century AD

Location
- Interactive map of Zaghouan Aqueduct

The Zaghouan Aqueduct or Aqueduct of Carthage is an ancient Roman aqueduct, which supplied the city of Carthage, Tunisia with water. From its source in Zaghouan it flows a total of 132 km, making it among the longest aqueducts in the Roman Empire.

Some of its length (40 ha area) is also classified as an Important Bird Area (TN013) as the cavities and holes in the aqueduct are used as nesting and roosting sites by falcons and other species.

== Date ==
The date of the construction of the aqueduct is not entirely clear. Sources mention a visit by the Emperor Hadrian in 128, with which a five-year-long drought is meant to have come to an end. The water shortage resulting from the drought might have convinced him that the people should not rely only on rainwater anymore. A second event that might have inspired it was the opening of the Baths of Antonius in Carthage in 162. These facilities on the same scale as the Imperial baths in Rome demanded a steady supply of water, which could not be fulfilled with rainwater.

== Sources ==
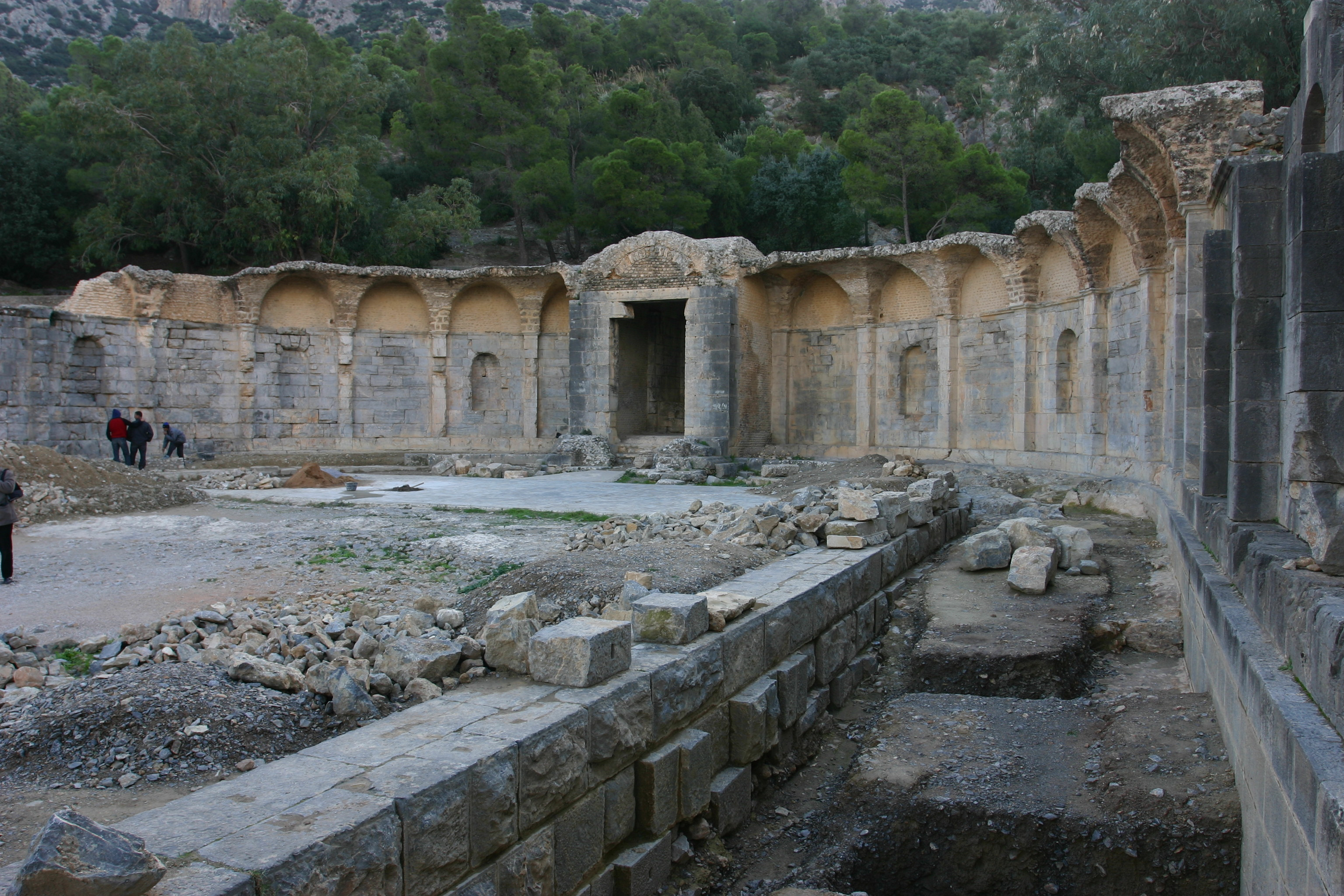
Remains of the sacred spring at Zaghouan

The aqueduct draws on several sources which ran dry at different times. The first and most important source is located near the town of Zaghouan in the Djebel Zaghouan, a mountain range about 60 km south of Carthage. In Roman times a sacred fountain structure was built over the spring, which became one of the most important in ancient North Africa.

=== Description ===
The sacred fountain is located on an artificial terrace. It is open on the north side, and on the southern side there is an open space enclosed by a 4-metre-wide (13 ft), crescent-shaped portico. In the center of the portico is a cella from which the spring sprang.

The outer wall had a core of Roman concrete covered with coarse limestone bossages. This wall continued from the ends of the crescent-shaped portico and was divided into 26 sections be engaged columns. In every second section, there is a niche for statues, which do not survive. Opposite each engaged column is a full column, which together once supported a vaulted peristyle. The vaults are made of porous travertine covered in marble, while the columns are sandstone. The exterior of the vault was sealed with waterproof Opus signinum and left without further protection. The floor of the portico was decorated with mosaic. The cella, the most important part of the building was built from limestone and clad in marble.

=== Intake ===
There were five springs in the area of the sacred fountain. These were in the area of the artificial terrace in their original, underground bed and gathered in a basin under the terrace. From this basin, the water then flowed into the pipe of the aqueduct. As well as feeding the aqueduct intake, the basin also served to clean the water - while the water sat in the basin, impurities would settle on the bottom.

=== Second source ===
In Severan times, a second source was attached to the aqueduct. This was located in the region of Djouggar. A sacred fountain was built over this spring too, but it never reached the significance of the one at Zaghouan.

== Water channel ==
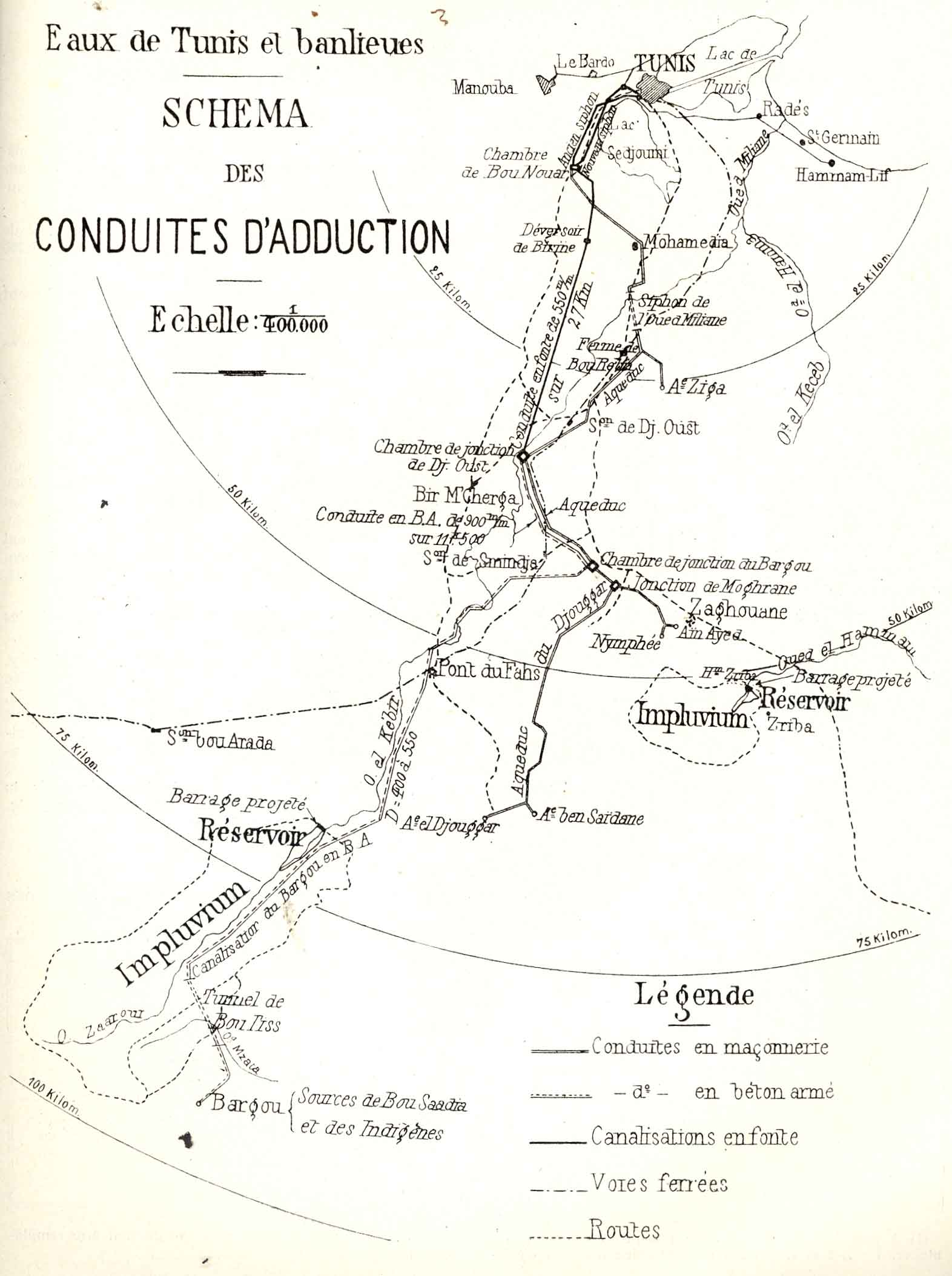
Map of the channels running from Zaghouan and Jouggar to Tunis (1928)

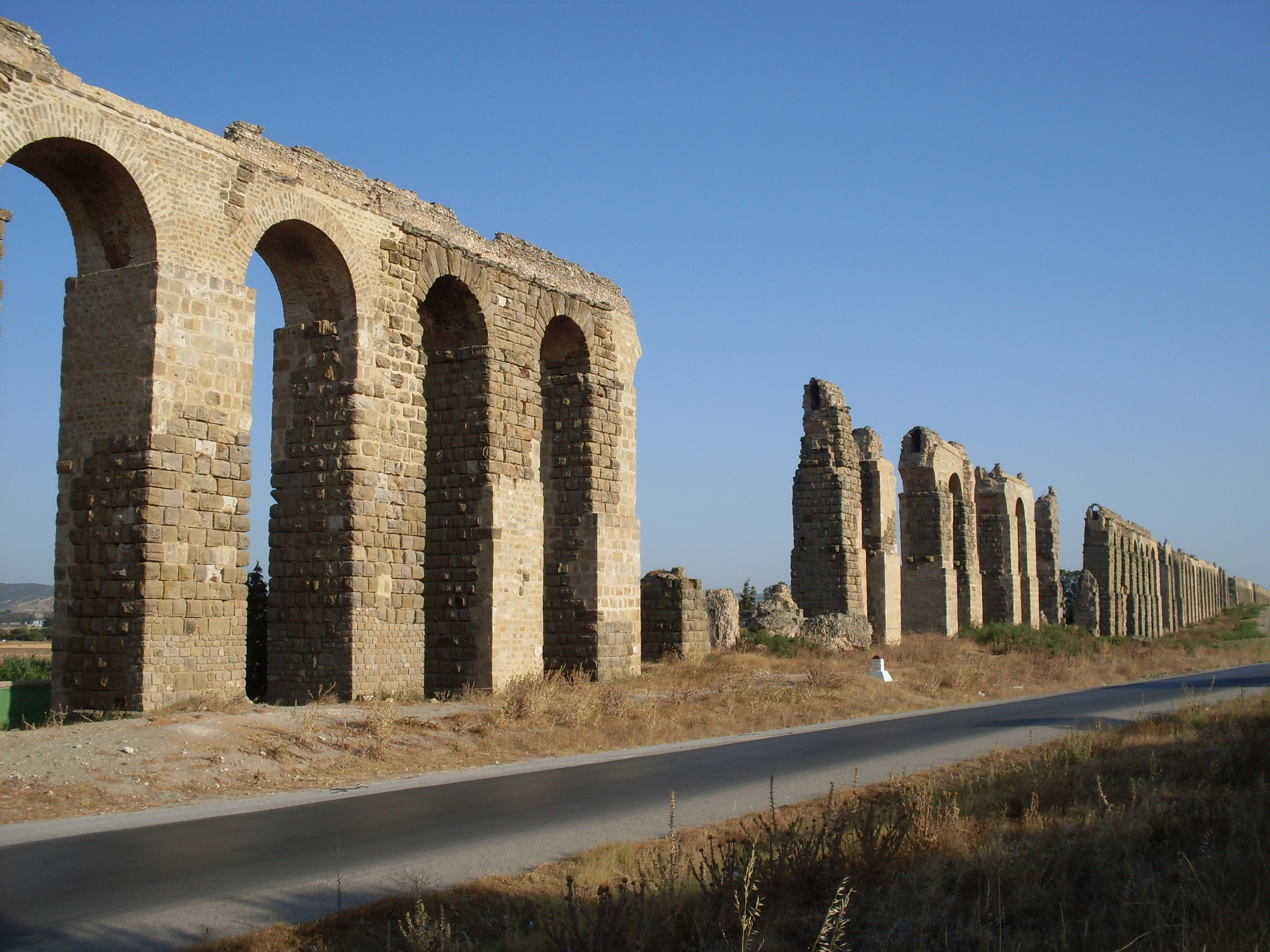
Restored section on the plain of La Soukra, shortly before Carthage

=== Technical data ===
The aqueduct is a masterpiece of Roman engineering. In the journey from Zaghouan to Carthage, it travels a little over 90 km and drops only 264 m in height, which is an average decline of 0.3%. However, 130 m of the height difference occurs in the first 6 km from Zaghouan to Moghrane. For the rest of the journey to Carthage, the decline averages only 0.15%. In Moghrane the aqueduct met the later channel coming from Djouggar, another 33 km away. Including all its tributary channels, the aqueduct has a length of 132 km and is among the longest in the Roman empire.

The channel discharged between 200 and 370 L of water per second or between 17 and 32 million liters per day. The flow rate was around 3.5 and 5.5 km per hour. Therefore, the water made the journey from Zaghouan to Carthage in between a day and a half, to two days.

=== Course ===
The channel was built such that it had a steady, if not uniform, fall so that the water would travel the route by the force of gravity alone. In order to minimize the building work, the channel was laid on or a little under the Earth's surface where possible. In order to avoid unnecessary loss of height, the channel follows the contours of hills. In three places it was not possible for the channel to remain at ground level, so the engineers erected imposing arcades. They are:

- The plain of Oudna: 5 km, including a 125-metre-long (410 ft) bridge on a double arcade with a height of 33 m. This bridge was demolished in 1859 in order to reuse the stone for the construction of a new bridge.
- The plain of Miliane: 2 km, the arcade reaches up to 20 m in height.
- The plain of La Soukra, before Carthage: 10 km, the arcade reaches up to 20 m in height.

=== Cross-section ===
In cross-section, the channel measures about 90 cm in width and 130 cm in height. It was closed on top by a vault. The walls were made from Roman cement and were clad with sandstone bossage. The part of the channel which came in contact with water was further clad in waterproof opus signinum. The screed also served to smooth the channel's rate of decline. Ventilation was provided by small, square openings in the roof. At regular intervals on the base of the channel, there were circular depressions, which served to purify the water, since detritus would settle in them. To continue to operate, these had to be cleaned out regularly, so the channel required ongoing care and attention

== Cisterns ==
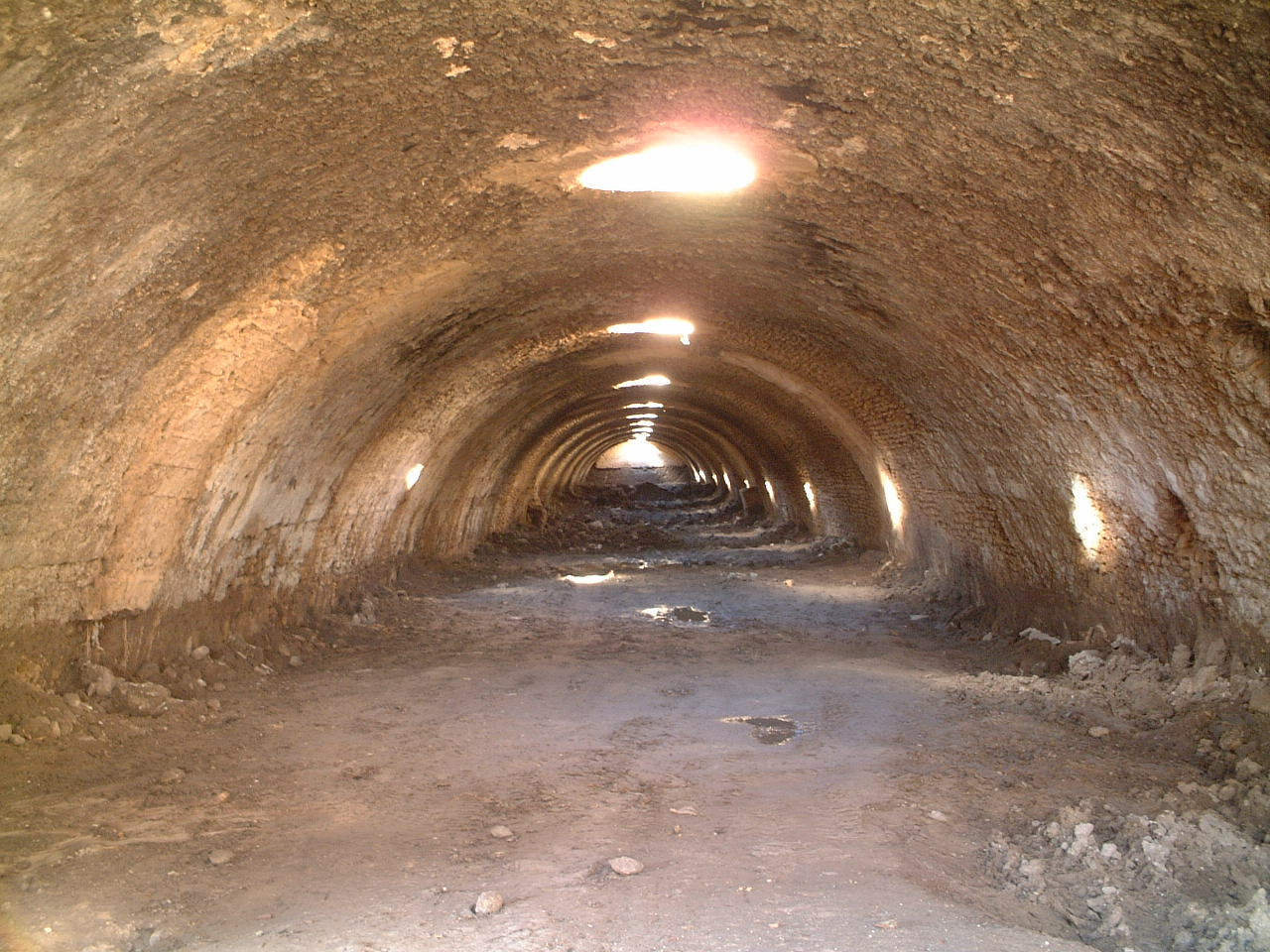
View of a vault of the cistern at La Malga

The distribution of the water within Carthage is not yet entirely clear. It seems that the channel discharged into two cisterns and the water was further distributed from these. To date, however, archaeological excavations have found no sure signs of discharge into the cisterns.

=== Cisterns of La Malga ===
The cisterns of La Malga form the largest cisterns surviving from the ancient world anywhere. They held approximately 51 million liters. Based on the nature of the mortar, they are dated to the first century AD. It is not yet clear how these cisterns were used in that period, since the aqueduct had not yet been built and this enormous volume could never have been filled by rainwater alone.

=== Cistern of Bordj Djedid ===
The cistern of Bordj Djedid is made up of 18 barrel-shaped basins arranged in parallel and held between 25 and 30 million liters. It was responsible for supplying the Baths of Antonius. The construction date is unknown, but modifications have been detected in connection with the construction of the Baths of Antonius, implying that the cistern preceded the baths.

== Later usage ==
Since the water supply was essential for the city, the aqueduct was destroyed during the Vandal siege of 439, the Eastern Roman reconquest under Justinian and finally at the conquest of Carthage by the Arabs in 698, but each time it was subsequently restored. In the thirteenth century, one of the Hafsid rulers added a branch leading to his palace in Manouba in order to supply water for his garden. From the sixteenth century, the aqueduct deteriorated rapidly and was employed as a stone quarry.

In 1859 a French engineer received the task of restoring the water channel in order to supply Tunis with water. While the majority of the channels at ground level could be reused, the parts of the channel on pillars were mostly destroyed and a modern pressure pipe system was installed. Since it was put into operation in 1862, the channel has remained in use and today it supplies an average of 12,000,000 L per day in winter and 3,000,000 in summer.

== Important Bird Area ==
The cavities and holes in the aqueduct are used as nesting and roosting sites by the lesser kestrel Falco naumanni (30 pairs), but also by the Lanner falcon Falco biarmicus and the common kestrel Falco tinnunculus as well as the European roller Coracias garrulus, rock sparrows Petronia petronia, spotless starlings Sturnus unicolor and common ravens Corvus corax. The site is of particular significance for the lesser krestel as it regularly holds significant numbers the species, (which is a species of global conservation concern).

The protected area extends over 40 ha as a band stretching near the Milliana river along the aqueduct 20-m-high pillars and arches in which many cavities and holes used by birds have developed. The surrounding area consists of cereal fields and is a hunting reserve.

== Gallery ==
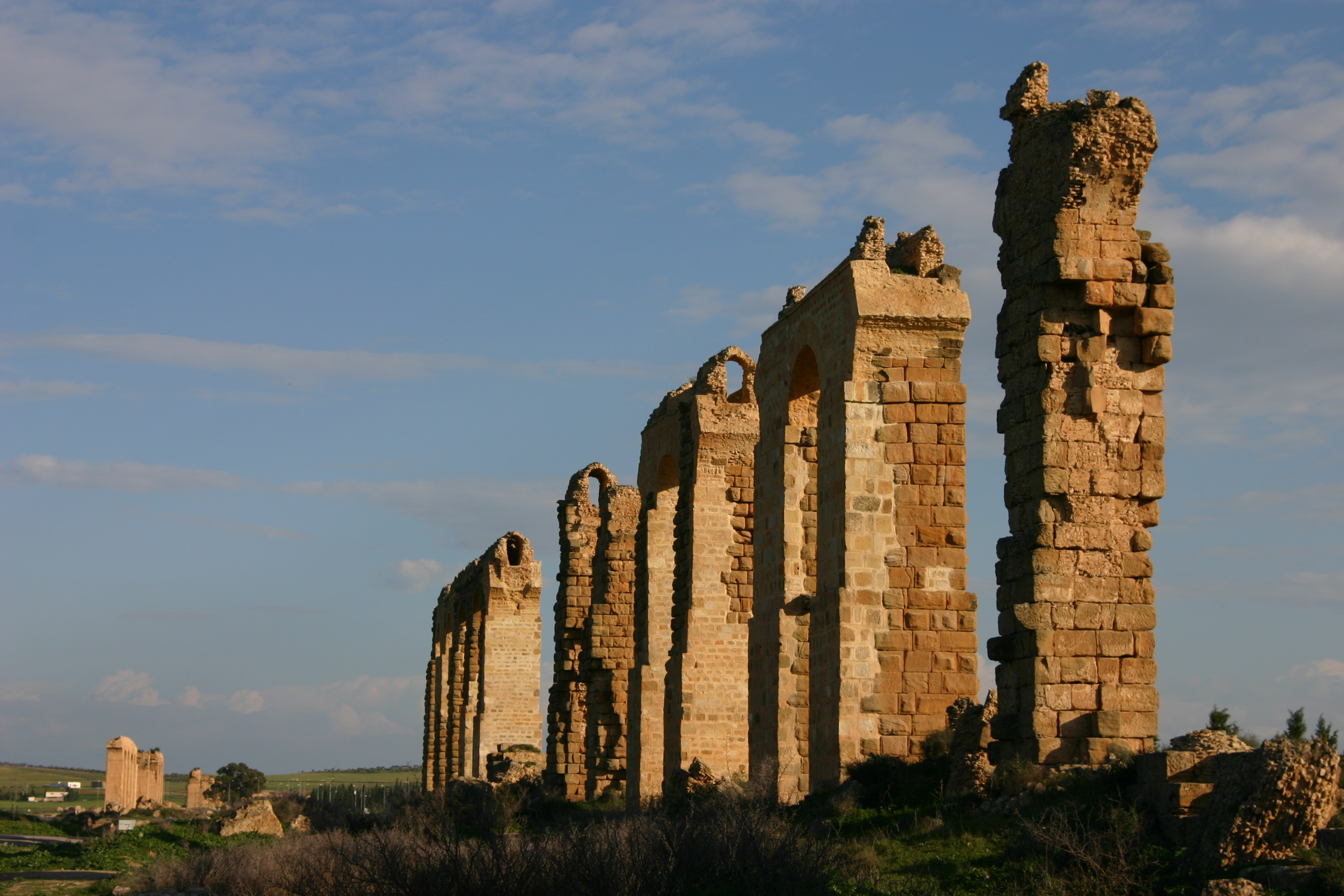
Remains of pillars in the plain of La Soukra

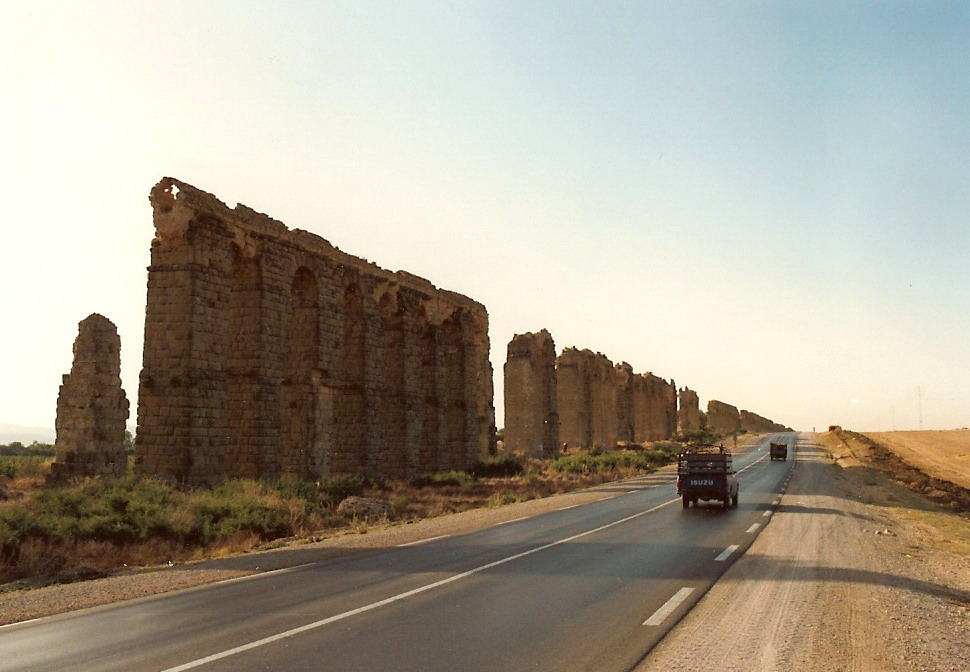
Remains of pillars at Mohamedia

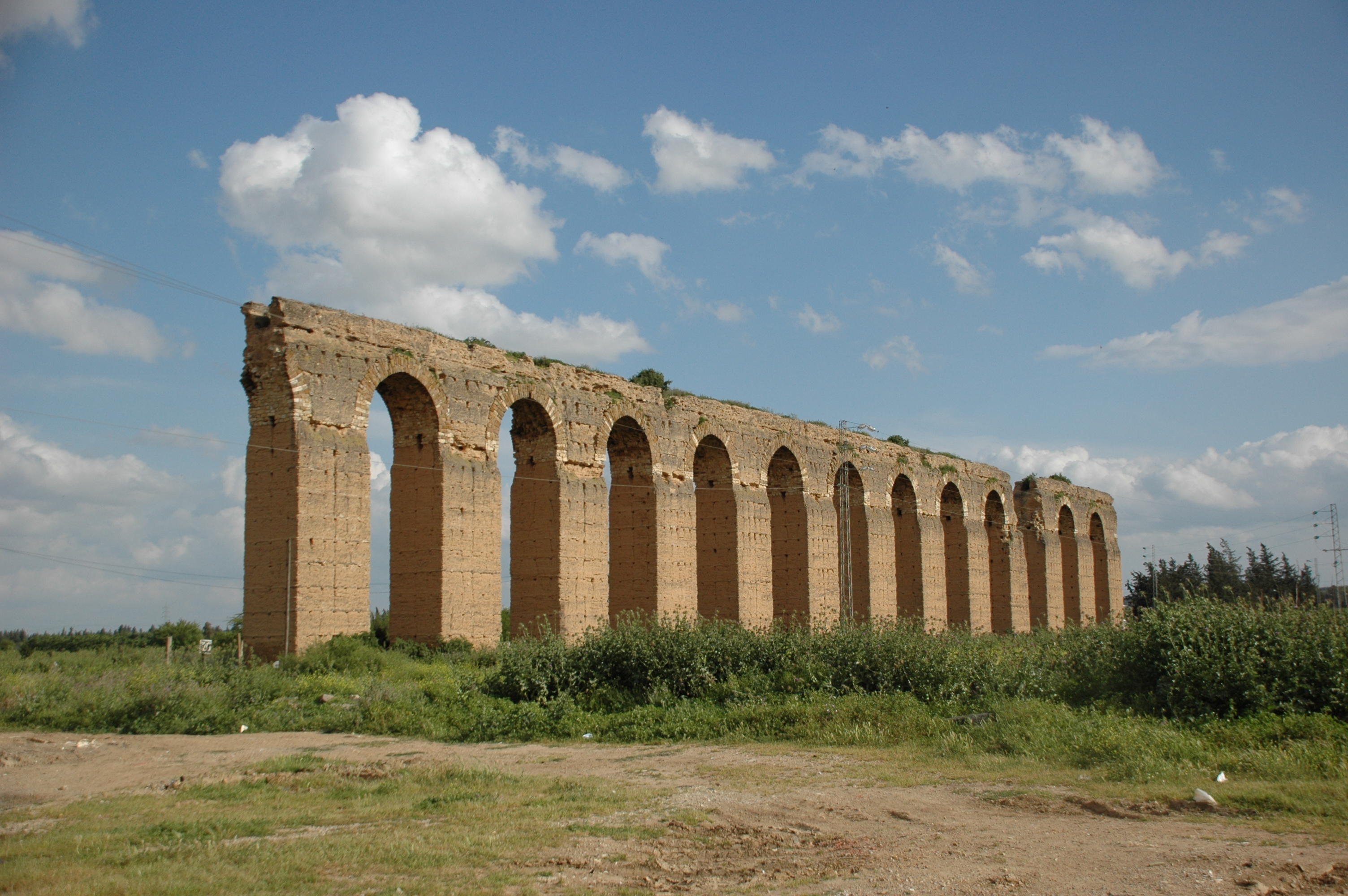
Pillar restored in Maghrebi style

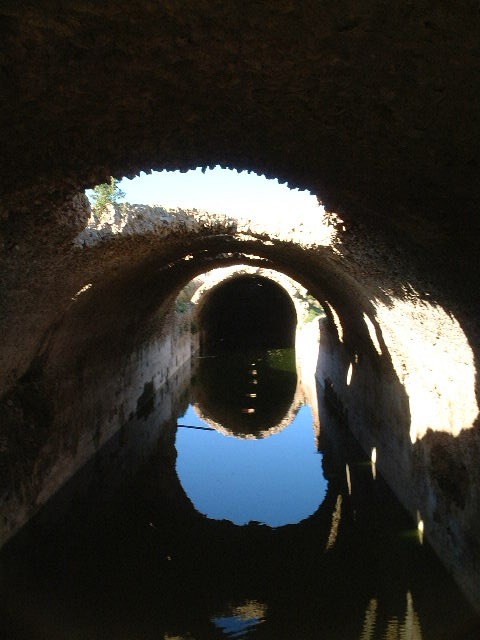
A vault of the Cistern of La Malga

== See also ==
- List of aqueducts in the Roman Empire
- List of Roman aqueducts by date
- Ancient Roman technology
- Roman engineering
