= SAKO (programming language) =

- Paradigm: Multi-paradigm: structured, imperative (procedural), array
- Designed by: Leon Łukaszewicz, Antoni Mazurkiewicz, Jan Borowiec, Jowita Koncewicz, Maria Łącka, Stefan Sawicki, Jerzy Swianiewicz, Piotr Szorc, Alfred Szurman and Andrzej Wiśniewski
- Developer: Polish Academy of Sciences
- First appeared: 1960; 65 years ago

Influenced by
- Fortran

SAKO (PL: System Automatycznego KOdowania - EN: An Automatic Coding System) is a Polish language-based programming language written between 1959 and 1960 by a team from the ZAM division of the Polish Academy of Sciences. Originally developed for the XYZ and ZAM-2 computers, it was also ported over to the ZAM-21, ZAM-41 and the Mińsk-22.

General features of the SAKO language:

- commands similar to sentences used in natural language
- shortening the time required to learn the principles of programming
- ease of use, which reduced coding time
- transparent program code, lowering the probability of making a mistake

It had a static address allocation. It was possible to insert code in SAS macro assembler. The compilation proceeded in two stages:

1. From SAKO to simplified SAS macro assembler (SAS-W).
2. From SAS-W to machine language.

The most characteristic feature of SAKO are Polish commands, e.g. CZYTAJ, SKOCZ DO. It was designed primarily for programming numerical calculations.

== "Hello, world" example ==
TEKST:  
HELLO, WORLD
LINIA
STOP NASTEPNY
KONIEC
