= La Presse de Tunisie =

French-language daily newspaper published in Tunis, Tunisia

- Type: Daily newspaper
- Format: Broadsheet
- Publisher: Mohamed Gontara
- Editor: Jawhar Chatty
- Founded: 1934; 92 years ago
- Language: French
- Headquarters: Tunis, Tunisia
- Price: 1.5 TND
- ISSN: 0330-9991
- Website: La Presse

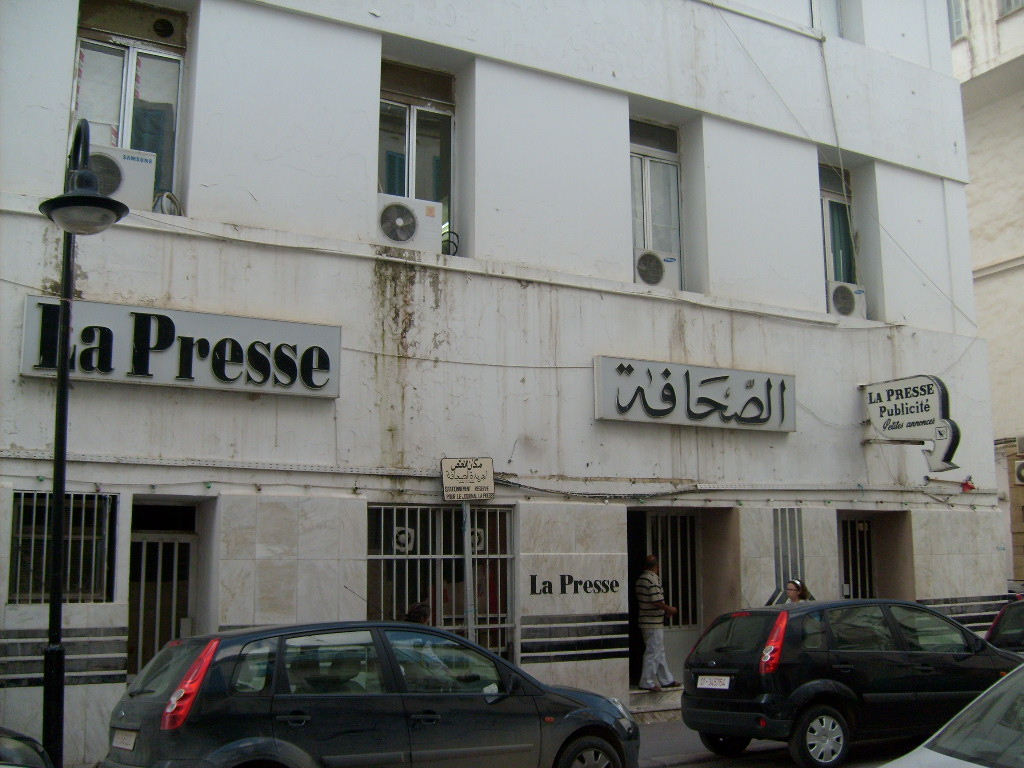
headquarters

La Presse, founded in 1934, is a large-circulation French-language daily newspaper published in Tunis, Tunisia.

== History ==
La Presse de Tunisie was founded in 1934 by Henri Smadja, a Tunisian and French Jewish doctor and lawyer, born in Tunisia, who became the owner of the daily newspaper Combat. The paper, based in Tunis, was close to the Constitutional Democratic Rally. Its sister paper is Arabic newspaper Assahafah. Before the 2010-2011 Tunisian protests La Presse de Tunisie was published by a state-owned publishing company.

As a result of these protests, the newspaper transformed from being seen as propaganda for Zine El Abidine Ben Ali's government to having editorial independence from the government. However, the owner of the daily is the government of Tunisia, more specifically the state-owned company SNIPE.

In addition, the president of the paper, Mohammad Nejib Ouerghi, worked for state-owned newspapers before the deportation of Zine El Abidine Ben Ali.

== See also ==
- List of newspapers in Tunisia
