= Abdullah Asnag =

Yemeni trade union leader

Abdullah Asnag (born 1933) was a Yemeni trade union leader. He was the head of the Aden Trade Union Congress. He was also president of the Peoples Socialist Party.
