= Aden Trade Union Congress =

Former trade union in South Yemen

ATUC
- Aden Trade Union Congress
- Merged into: Yemeni Confederation of Labor Unions
- Founded: 1956
- Dissolved: 1990
- Location(s): Aden Colony, State of Aden and South Yemen
- Key people: Abdullah Asnag
- Affiliations: WFTU

The Aden Trade Union Congress (ATUC or TUC) was a trade union in the Aden Colony, a British protectorate in Yemen.

== History ==
The ATUC was founded in 1956 during serious labour unrest in the area. Its organ was Al-'Amal (1957).

The Secretary General of the trade union was Abdullah Asnag, a pro-independence Arab nationalist and admirer of Nasser who also advocated union with Yemen. Supported by the UAR the ATUC rose in importance when the political disturbances and the violence reached a head and political parties ceased to function. By 1959 it was the only entity representing nationalist aspirations in Aden and it used its leverage to boycott elections as the main grouping of the People's Union. In November 1960 the ATUC boycotted the Aden municipal elections.

When Aden Colony became part of the Federation of South Arabia as the State of Aden the unrest continued. In the federation the ATUC had a large influence in the new assembly and to prevent it seizing control of the federation in 1962 the former Colony of Aden had joined the Federation of South Arabia so that Aden's pro-British assembly members could counter the ATUC's influence.

On 30 November 1967 the State of Aden became part of the independent People's Democratic Republic of Yemen, also known as South Yemen, and the ATUC became the main trade union of that state.

When South Yemen united with the Yemen Arab Republic, also known as North Yemen, on 22 May 1990, the Aden Trade Union Congress merged with the General Confederation of Workers' Trade Unions in order to form the Yemeni Confederation of Labor Unions.

The ATUC was affiliated to the World Federation of Trade Unions.

The ATUC's political arm was the People's Socialist party. The party modeled itself on the UK Labour Party and supported political means to accomplish its goals of British withdrawal, independence, and union with North Yemen. Its Arab nationalist orientation and reformist views commended it both to Egypt and to the left wing of Britain's Labour Party.

== See also ==
- History of Yemen
