= Tunisia News =

Tunisian newspaper

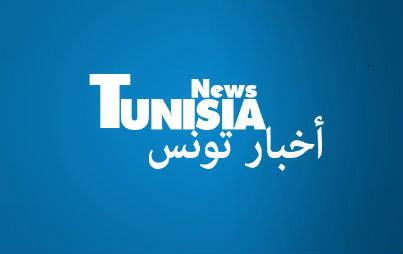
Tunisia news

Tunisia News is an English language weekly newspaper in Tunisia. It was founded by former Tunisian Minister of Agriculture, Environment and Water Resources Mohamed Lahbib Haddad.

== See also ==
- List of newspapers in Tunisia
