= Yemeni Confederation of Labor Unions =

Yemeni trade union center

YCLU
- Yemeni Confederation of Labor Unions
- Founded: 1990
- Location: Yemen
- Key people: Yahya al-Kahlan
- Affiliations: WFTU

The Yemeni Confederation of Labor Unions (YCLU) is the sole national trade union center in Yemen. It was formed in 1990 by the merger of the Aden Trade Union Congress and the General Confederation of Workers' Trade Unions.

The YCLU is affiliated to the World Federation of Trade Unions. In 2002, the Yemeni Confederation of Labor Unions had 350,000 members in 14 unions.

The war in Yemen has negatively impacted trade unions and workers in Yemen. In 2017, Ali Belkhadr, the Head of the General Federation of Trade Unions of Yemen, called on international financial organizations and the United Nations to pressure the warring parties to agree on a mechanism to pay the salaries of workers.
