= L'Alba =

Tunisian fascist newspaper

l'Alba
- Type: Weekly
- Founder(s): Giuseppe Colombo, R.A. Oliva
- Founded: 5 September 1935
- Ceased publication: 14 November 1935
- Political alignment: Fascist
- Language: Italian language
- Headquarters: Tunis

L'Alba was an Italian-language fascist weekly newspaper published in Tunis, Tunisia. It was founded by Giuseppe Colombo and R. A. Oliva, with the first issue published on 5 September 1935.

Regarding the war against Ethiopia, l'Alba boasted of having two companies of blackshirts from Tunisia, "Numidie" and "Zama", at the battle-fields. The publication attacked freemasons and anti-fascists, while appealing to Italians to buy products from their own nation. The British consulate found the diatribes in l'Alba insulting to Great Britain and Malta, and lodged a formal complaint against the publication. It was subsequently shut down by French colonial authorities - with the last issue published on 14 November 1935.

== See also ==
- Italian Tunisians
