= International School of Aleppo =

Coordinates: 36°11′40″N 37°7′10″E

- Aleppo; Syria

Information
- Type: Private
- Founded: 1977
- Closed: 2011 (due to Syrian Civil War)
- President: Shirley B. Davis (until 2011)
- Grades: K-12
- Enrollment: 385
- Average class size: 20
- Language: English, Spanish, and French
- Colors: Blue and green
- Mascot: Eagle
- Rivals: Lycee Francais D'Alep
- Publication: The Link, IISA Yearbook
- Website: icardaschool.org

International School of Aleppo (ISA) founded in 1977, was an English language school in Aleppo and the only International Baccalaureate World School in Syria. It offered the IB Primary Years Programme and IB Diploma Programme. The school's other major programs included International General Certificate of Secondary Education for ninth and tenth-graders. As of September 2025, the school is no longer open due to the lasting effects of the Syrian Civil War.

The ISA was a co-educational day school sponsored by the International Center for Agricultural Research in the Dry Areas (ICARDA). ISA offered a high quality, internationally acceptable program, primarily for the children of ICARDA employees. At the time of its closure, there were 385 students enrolled in grades K-12 representing 37 countries.

This school had a high range of facilities and a very strong athletic department. The campus had 14 buses, various administrative buildings and many green parks. The school had one soccer field, a tennis and badminton court, a volleyball court and a basketball court.

The elementary school had a swimming program as well as many other after-school extra-curriculars. The secondary school also offered various extra-curricular and other opportunities outside school. For instance, students in Grade 6–12 participated in "Regional Studies Trips" where they traveled to other regions in Syria and around the Middle East to learn about new cultures.

== Basic information ==
- Grades: Preschool to 12
- Location: Aleppo, Syria
- Accreditation: Middle States Association of Colleges and Schools in the United States
