= Djebel Zaghouan =

Mountain in Tunisia

Coordinates: 36°21′07″N 10°06′44″E

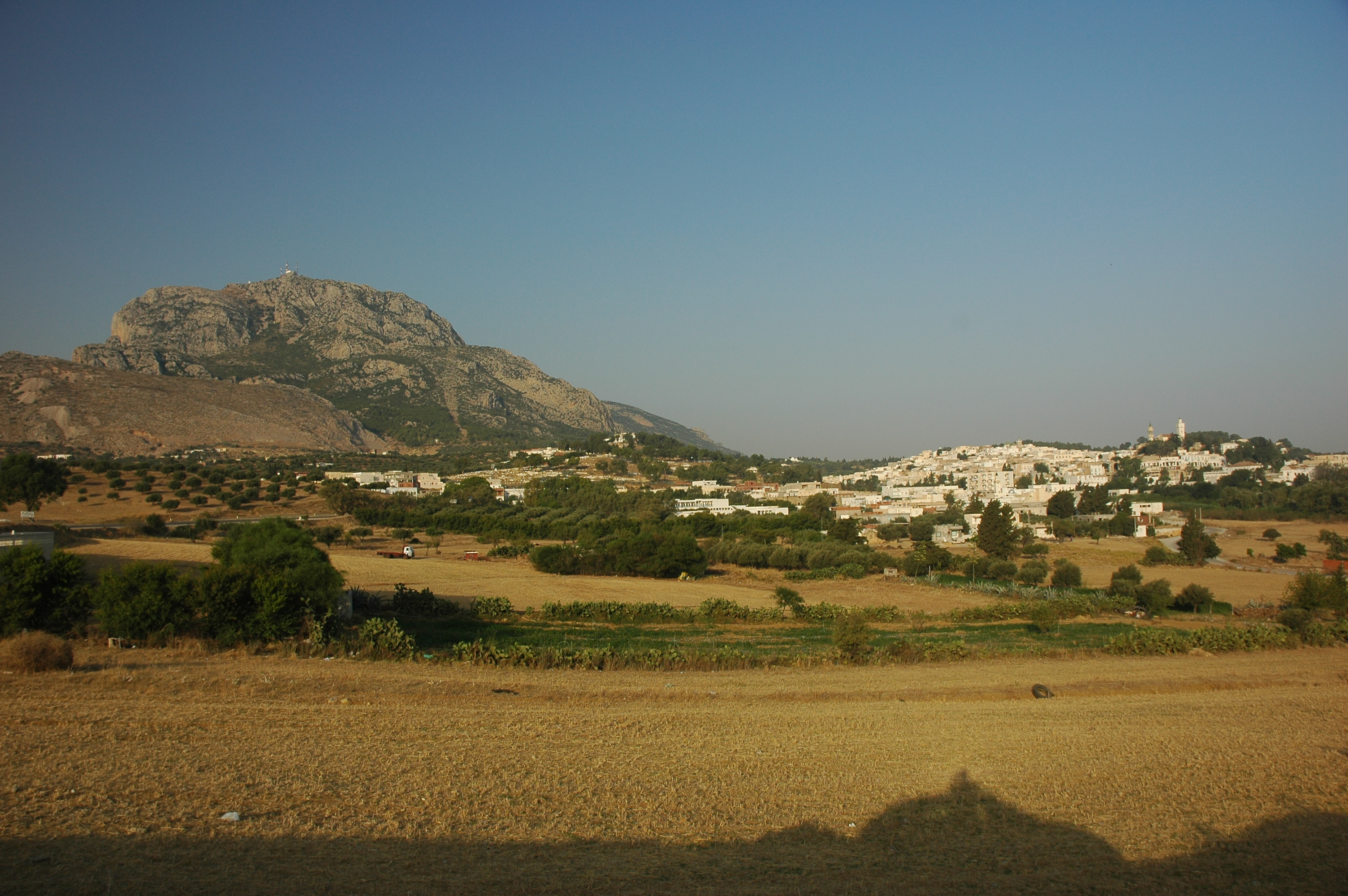
Djebel Zaghouan in Tunisia

Djebel Zaghouan (Arabic: جبل زغوان) is a mountain and the highest point in Eastern Tunisia at 1,295 m. The mountain is located in an area of a National Park.

The town of Zaghouan is located below on its northern slope. The mountain is the site of a Roman temple known as the Temple des Eaux (Temple of Water), which marks the site of an aqueduct which used to take water to the city of Carthage over 100 km away.

== Appearance in Literature ==
The temple is the subject of a posthumous poem, Temple and Fountain at Zagwhan, by Letitia Elizabeth Landon to illustrate a plate, which appeared in Fisher's Drawing Room Scrap Book, 1841.

== Gallery ==
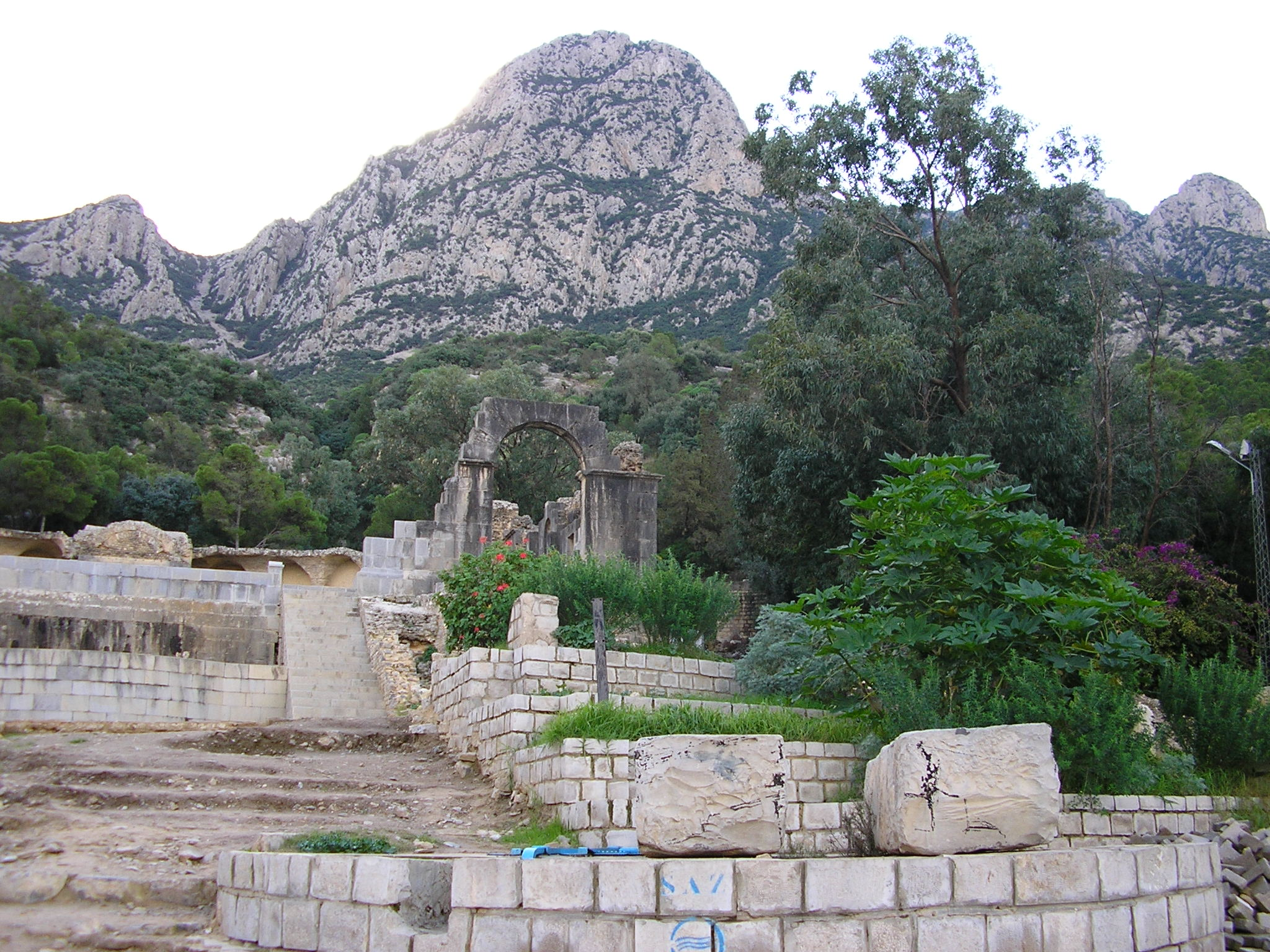
Djebel Zaghouan behind the water temple

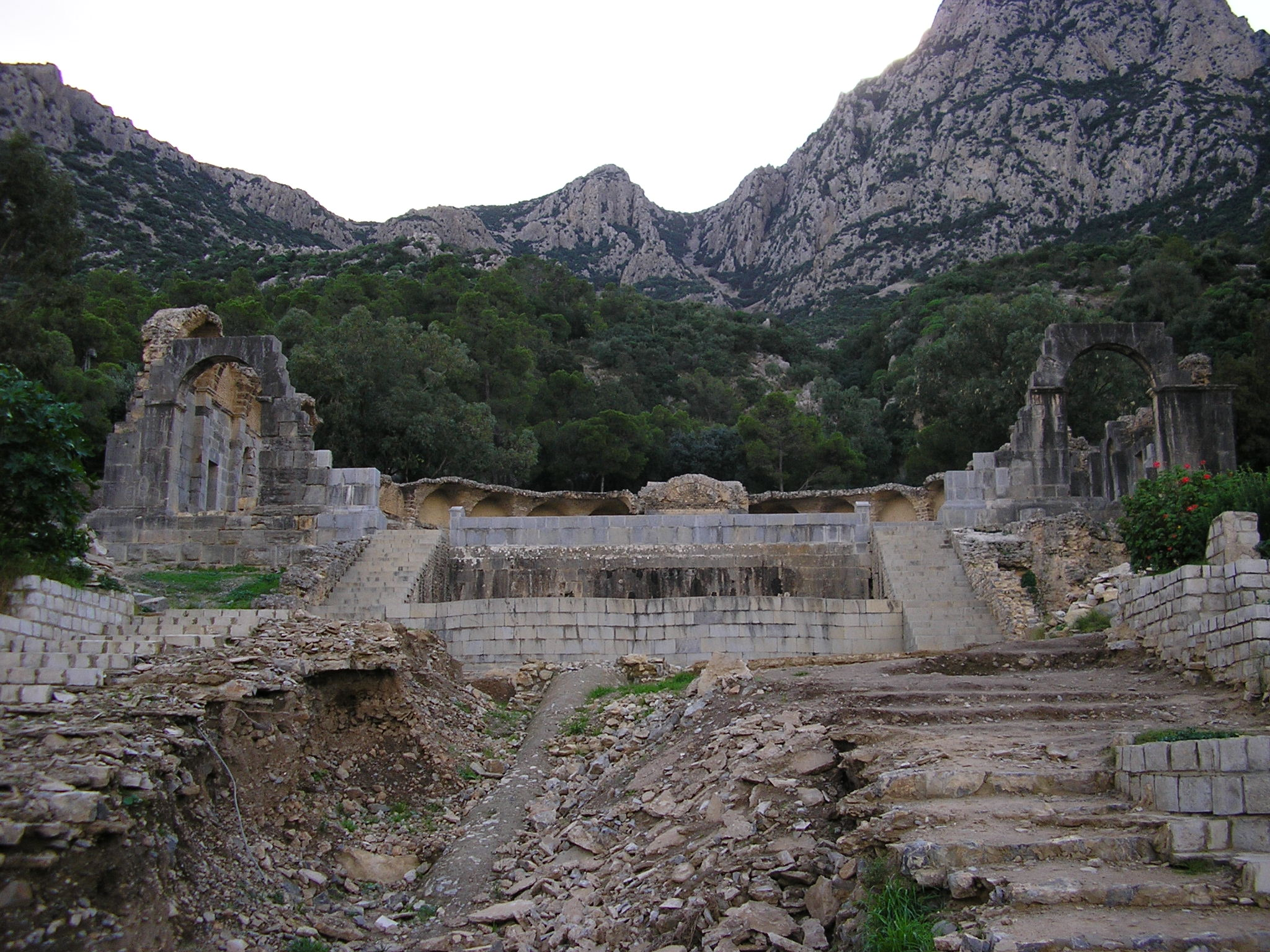
A part of the temple

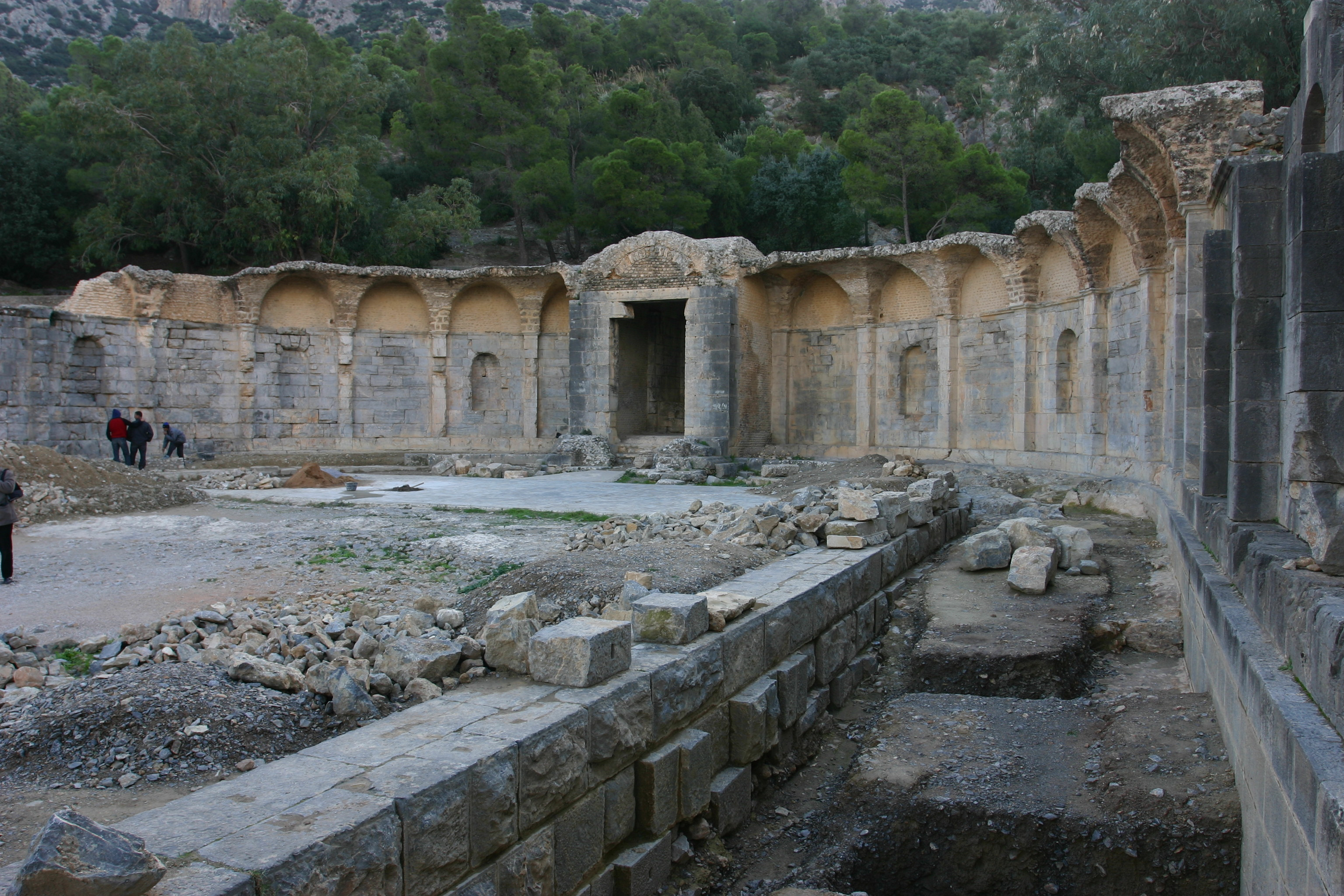
Temple ruins
