= XYZ (computer) =

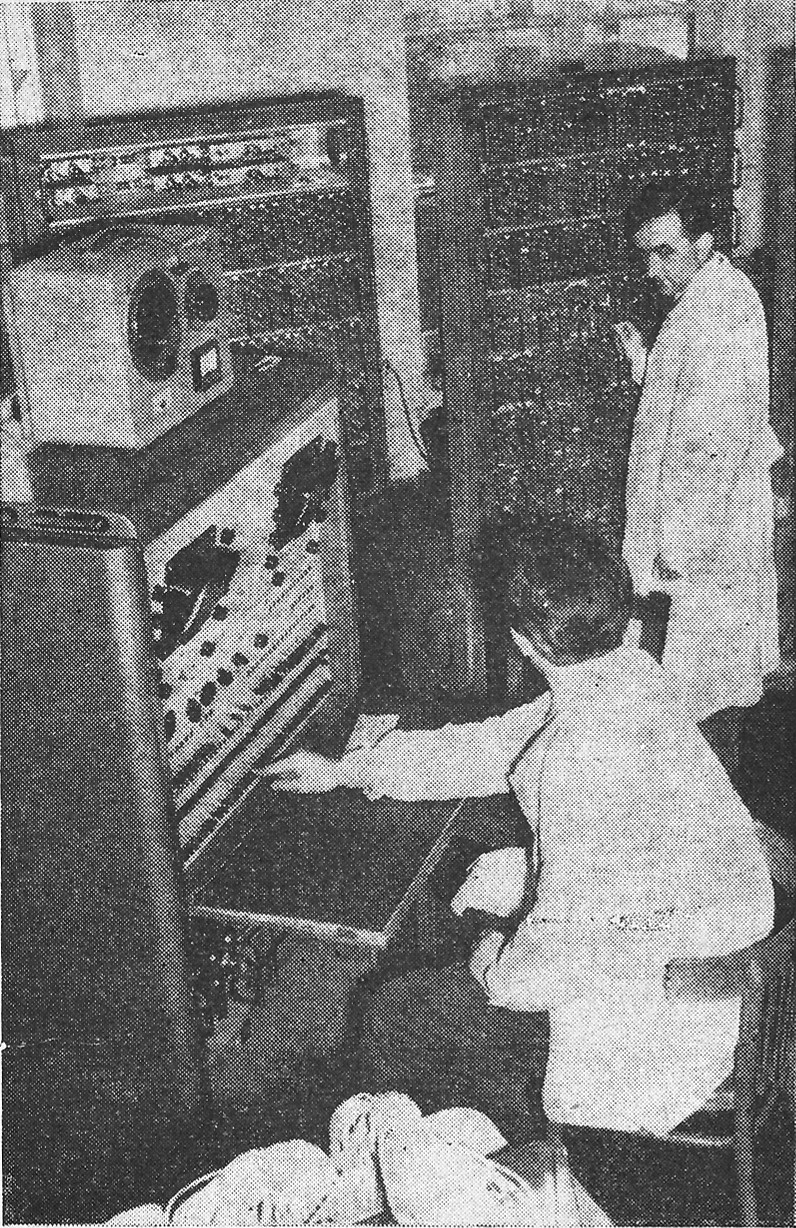
XYZ computer

XYZ was the first Universal Digital Machine from the family of early computers built and launched in Poland in 1958. It was ahead of EMAL2 by a few months, while the earlier EMAL was not fully launched.

== Construction ==
XYZ computer was built and launched in Warsaw at ul. Śniadeckich 8, at the premises of the Bureau of Calculations and Programs of the Mathematical Apparatus Department of the Polish Academy of Sciences (later the Institute of Mathematical Machines). The team was led by professor Leon Łukaszewicz.

XYZ was a laboratory model of a utility machine; the ZAM-2 series was created on the basis of this computer.

The logical organisation was modelled on the simplified IBM 701, but the electronics were based on the dynamic flip-flops of the M-20 machine, requiring twice as few lamps. The design of the flip-flops and gates was derived from EMAL, but the vacuum diodes were replaced with germanium ones. The working memory was also derived from the EMAL machine after the improvement. It was a dynamic serial computer that computed in binary arithmetic.

The machine initially had no permanent memory, only RAM based structurally on ultrasound delay in a mercury-filled tubes. It was later expanded with a drum memory, an input-output system implemented through a primitive control console and a card reproducer (later a tape reader/perforator).

The basic fields of use of XYZ were mathematical calculations, and artillery conversion factors for the needs of the army. Programmer Bogdan Miś wrote a program for entertainment on it in 1960 - a tic-tac-toe game, using an oscilloscope to present the course of the game. XYZ led to his own win or a draw, because the program includes all the strategies for its conduct. Another demonstrative program written for XYZ was an animation of a dog peeing on a tree (also shown on the oscilloscope screen) created for the visit of the film crew, creating material about the first Polish computer.

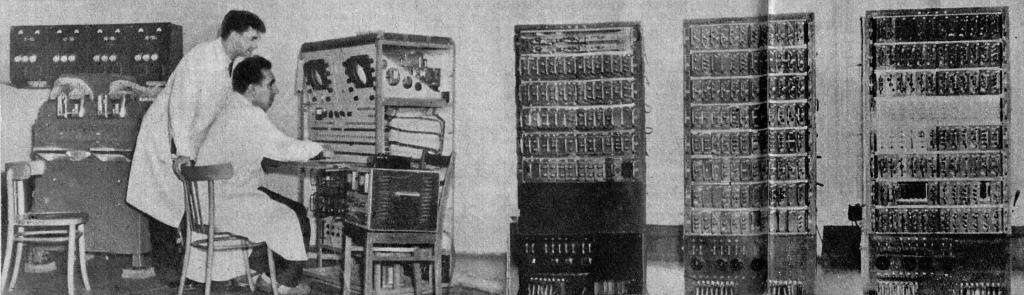

== Specifications ==
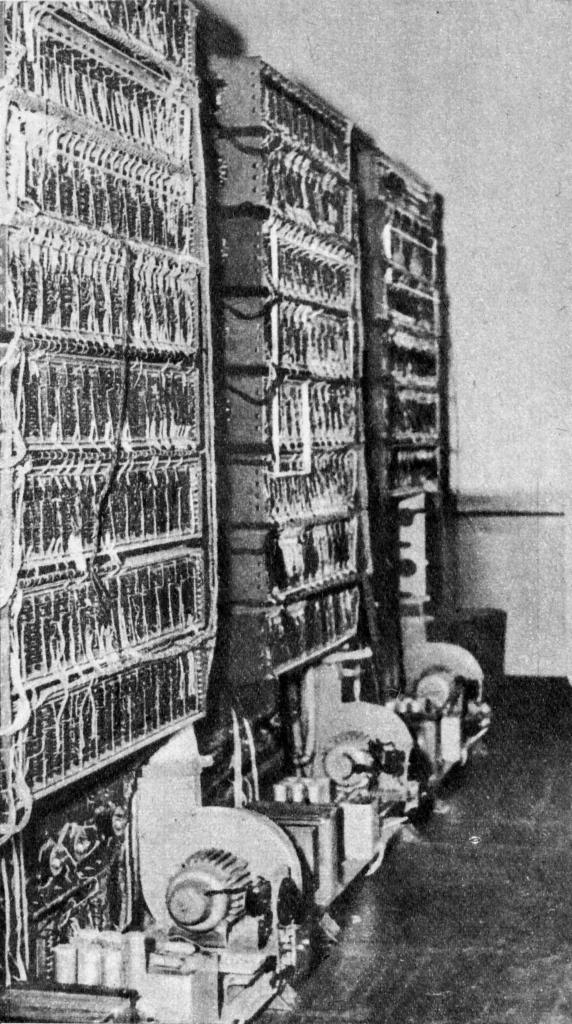
Back of the arithmometer and XYZ computer control unit

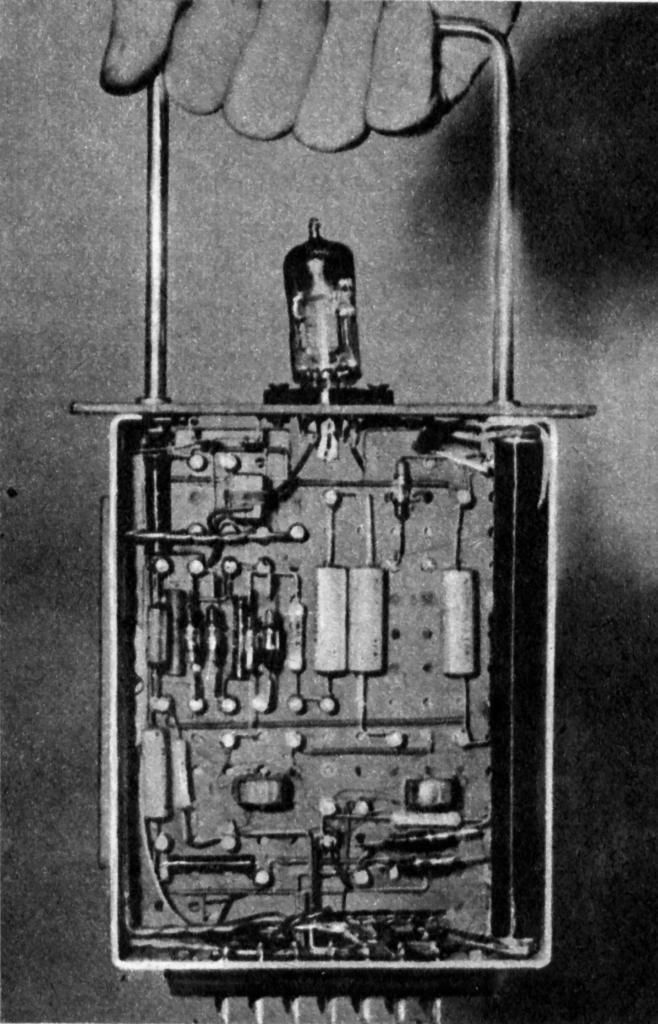
A plug-in circuit module with two latches, from the XYZ Computer

- Organization:
  - single-address, dynamic serial computer with circuit control
  - binary arithmetic, notation of numbers sign-module
  - word length: 36 bits
- speed:
  - 650–4500 additions per second (approximately 1000 average)
  - 250–500 multiplications per second (350 average)
  - Clock generator: approx. 680 kHz
- memory:
  - mercury working memory:
    - capacity: 2.25 KiB - 512 words (32 pipes of 576 bits)
    - average access time : 0.4 ms
  - drum
    - fixed heads
    - capacity: 36 KiB (64 tracks of 128 words)
    - average access time: 20 ms
- External devices: reader and perforator card
- Technology: 400 electron tubes and 2000 diodes

== Programming languages ==
- internal language of the machine
- simple PROBIN assembler
- SAS macroassembler
- SAKO
