= Es-Sabah =

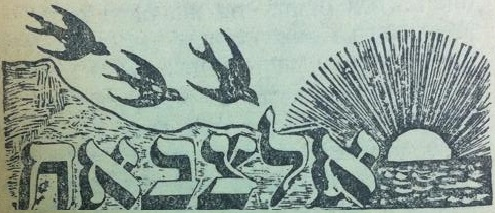
- Type: Daily
- Founder: Jacob Cohen
- Founded: 1 November 1904
- Ceased publication: 14 May 1940
- Political alignment: Zionist
- Language: Judeo-Arabic
- Headquarters: 51, avenue de Paris, Tunis36°48′12.1″N 10°10′50.5″E

Es-Sabah ('The Morning') was a Judeo-Arabic daily newspaper, printed in the Hebrew alphabet, published from Tunis, Tunisia.

== History and profile ==
Es-Sabah was founded and directed by Jacob Cohen. The first issue came out on 1 November 1904. It was the most popular Jewish newspaper in the country at one point. The issues contained between four and sixteen pages. Politically, it served as an organ for philanthropic Zionism.

Es-Sabah carried the byline Es-Sabah, seul quotidien israélite du Nord-Africain, le plus fort tirage des journaux israélites de Tunisie ("Es-Sabah, the only Jewish daily in North Africa, with the highest circulation of the Jewish papers in Tunisia").

By the 1930s Es-Sabah was the last remaining Judeo-Arabic newspaper in the country. At the turn of the century, however, Tunisia had hosted a vivid Judeo-Arabic press. As of 1937 Simon Cohen was the director of Es-Sabah. Es-Sabah, along with other Jewish publications in Tunisia, was suppressed by the Vichy regime in October 1940. The last issue of Es-Sabah was published on 14 May 1940.
