= Assarih =

Tunisian daily satirical newspaper and streaming site

- Format: Small format broadsheet
- Publisher: Salah El Hajja
- Founded: 1995; 30 years ago
- Language: Arabic
- Ceased publication: 2018 (print)
- Headquarters: Tunis, Tunisia
- Website: www.assarih.com

Assarih (Arabic: الصريح) is a Tunisian daily newspaper in Arabic founded on 3 January 1995 by Salah El Hajja. It became a daily from 2 October 2002 and ceased to appear in print on 2 April 2018 while remaining active on the Internet.
