= Lycée français d'Alep =

Coordinates: 36°06′53″N 36°58′42″E

- Mission laïque française

Location
- Cordoba Hills, Kafr Joum; Aleppo; Syria

Information
- Type: Private school
- Established: 1997
- Founder: Mission laïque française
- Principal: George hallak
- Grades: 1 - 12
- Athletics: football, basketball, tennis, badminton, swimming
- Affiliations: Mission laïque française
- Languages: French, Arabic, English
- Website: https://web.archive.org/*/http://www.lyceefrancaisdalep.com/

The Lycée français d'Alep (Arabic: المدرسة الفرنسية بحلب), known also as Lycée français international, MLF lycée d'Alep, École française or the French school, is a French lycée in the city of Aleppo, Syria, founded in 1997 by the Mission laïque française, an organization which also helped found other lycées worldwide.

The school is located at Cordoba Hills neighborhood, near the village of Kafr Joum, 15 kilometres (9.3 mi) south-west of Aleppo city, near the Aleppo-Damascus highway. It is a large educational complex consisting of several buildings and sports facilities. The Lycée français d'Alep, along with the Lycée Charles de Gaulle in Damas (opened in 2008) and the lycée français de Tartus (opened in 2017) are the only French schools in Syria which are accredited by the French Ministry of National Education.

== History ==
The school closed in 2012 and the campus was destroyed as a result of the Syrian civil war. In 2014, the school had a partial reopening in a private residence, with students taking CNED correspondence classes. At the time 8 students were French.

== Programme ==
As a French accredited institution, the school follows the official teaching programmes of the French Republic. The school offers a complete education programme of 15 years which starts with a preliminary 3 years of kindergarten classes and ends by achieving a French baccalaureate degree with two options: "Economic & Social (ES)" and "Scientific (S)". The baccalaureate allows graduates to continue their studying in French universities all over the world as well as some other American, Canadian, European and Middle Eastern universities.

== See also ==
- International School of Aleppo
- Mission laïque française
