= Imperial baths =

Imperial baths were the great bathing establishments built by the Romans during the period of classical antiquity including:

- Baths of Caracalla
- Baths of Diocletian
- Trier Imperial Baths
