= List of Seirei Gensouki: Spirit Chronicles characters =

Seirei Gensouki: Spirit Chronicles is a light novel series written by Yuri Kitayama and illustrated by Riv.

== Main characters ==
=== Haruto Amakawa (天川 春人, Amakawa Haruto) / Rio (リオ) ===
Voiced by: Yoshitsugu Matsuoka, Ayaka Suwa (young) (Japanese); Kieran Regan, Fionn Kinsella (young) (English)
Haruto Amakawa was a Japanese college student who died in an unfortunate bus accident and reincarnated as Rio, an orphan from the slums of the Beltrum Kingdom's capital, Beltrum. Rio grew up swearing to avenge his mother's death, though his personality later shifted due to him regaining his memories as Haruto. He saved the kidnapped Princess Flora, and as a reward, was allowed to enroll in the Beltrum Kingdom Royal Institute. Unlike other magic users, Rio mastered Spiritual Arts and levitation. Later, due to a false accusation, he became a fugitive before he could graduate and was forced to flee the country. Rio traveled far east to his mother's homeland, Yagumo Region, to find his roots and stabilize his mixed personality. There, Rio meets his grandparents and cousin, learning of his royal heritage from the Karasuki Kingdom. Years later, he returned to the west with a new identity under Haruto's name, aiming to take his revenge on his parents' enemies. His most striking feature is his black hair, which is extremely rare among the population. Rio is recognized as a transcendent being by the World during an invasion instigated by Saint Erika.

=== Celia Claire (セリア = クレール, Seria Kurēru) ===
Voiced by: Akane Fujita (Japanese); Madeline Dorroh (English)
Celia was Rio's teacher and his only companion when he was studying at the Beltrum Royal Academy. On his first day of school, she taught him how to read and write numbers. She and Rio spent a lot of time together in her laboratory. She gradually fell in love with Rio. When Rio returned to Beltrum to visit her, he found out that Celia was being forced to become Charles Arbor's seventh wife. After Rio saved her, they lived in Rock House for a time, and Celia learned how to perceive magic power and some fundamentals of spirit magic. Celia is currently in the midst of traveling to the Restoration along with the First Princess Christina and her royal guard.

=== Aishia (アイシア) ===
Voiced by: Yūki Kuwahara (Japanese); Morgan Garrett (English)
Aishia is Rio's contracted spirit. She is willing to do anything for the sake of Haruto's happiness. Rio learned that she is an upper high-class spirit after he met the Spirit of the giant tree, Dryas. Aishia is a divine creation of Lina to give emotional and physical support for Rio as he carries the gentle nature of the once misunderstood and tireless legendary warrior Ryuo.

=== Suzune Endo (遠藤 涼音, Endō Suzune) / Latifa (ラティーファ, Ratīfa) ===
Voiced by: Tomori Kusunoki (Japanese); Julia Gu (English)
Suzune was an elementary school student who died on the same bus with Haruto and Rikka, and reincarnated as a young fox beastkin girl named Latifa. Originally an enemy of Rio who was enslaved by Duke Huguenot with a collar of submission and trained to be a merciless assassin, she was defeated and set free by Rio, later opting to follow him on his journey due to him resembling Haruto on the bus, until he would reunite her with her kin folk. She is extremely attached to Rio, having become his adoptive little sister, though it is strongly implied that she has romantic feelings for Rio (partially due to her past as Suzune), and she is very jealous of other girls when they interact with Rio.

=== Miharu Ayase (綾瀬 美春, Ayase Miharu) ===
Voiced by: Sayaka Harada (Japanese); Sarah Anne Williams (English)
Miharu Ayase is Haruto's first love and childhood friend. She long waited to be reunited with Haruto after his parents' divorce. Rio found Miharu and company in the forest, was confused about how to interact with her again as his moral values were different from those when he was Haruto. He also detested the idea of involving Miharu in his revenge quest. Later, Aishia bestowed a dream upon Miharu about Haruto and Rio's past before they reunited. This spurred Miharu to approach Rio more aggressively compared to her usual shy and timid personality. She later told Takahisa that she is in love with Haruto as his past self and as Rio. Takahisa attempts to kidnap Miharu but Rio saved her. Miharu is revealed to be the opposite reincarnation of Rio's past companion, Lina the Seventh Goddess.

=== Christina Beltrum (クリスティーナ = ベルトラム, Kurisutīna Berutoramu) ===
Voiced by: Sayumi Suzushiro (Japanese); Madeleine Morris (English)
Rio first meets Princess Christina in the slums when she was searching for her abducted sister Flora. The princess did not know how to interact with the common folk and slapped him because she thought he was the kidnapper. During their time at the academy, she avoided talking to him and didn't oppose when he was framed for a crime. Years later, Rio met with her at the banquet in the Galarc Kingdom, and despite being watched by the Arbor faction, she secretly thanked him for saving her sister in Amande. After, Rio met with her again as he accompanied Celia. Christina had escaped the Arbor faction and asked him for help in getting to Rodania. Seeing the trust between Rio and Celia, she suspects Haruto to be Rio, and her suspicions are later confirmed by Reiss.

=== Flora Beltrum (フローラ = ベルトラム, Furōra Berutoramu) ===
Voiced by: Kaede Hondo (Japanese); Madeleine Morris (English)
The second princess of the Beltrum Kingdom and younger sister of Christina Beltrum. She is kind by nature and loved by the people. She was enrolled in the Royal Institute one year below Rio. Due to the false charges against him, Rio is extremely wary of Flora. At the same time, he has no grudge toward her personally as he knows she did not frame him. Flora is the first inhabitant of the Beltrum Kingdom to recognize Rio despite his disguise. During the academy arc, Flora was sad seeing the treatment Rio received from the nobles and always wanted to talk to him. Flora has great admiration for Rio.

=== Satsuki Sumeragi (皇 沙月, Sumeragi Satsuki) ===
Voiced by: Haruka Tomatsu (Japanese); Katie Wetch (English)
A Japanese high school student who got summoned to another world as a Hero descended in the Galarc Kingdom. Though at first, she refused to act as a hero, she later agreed to do it as long as the kingdom agreed in helping her find a way for her to return home to Japan. However, Satsuki soon becomes quite depressed and lost her positivity, she spent her time in solitude, nevertheless, she deals with all the nobles that are trying to curry her favor aiming for her authority and knowing that the kingdom, in reality, wants her to stay, Satsuki has become quite cold and cautious. After reuniting with Miharu and the Sendo siblings with the help of Haruto, Satsuki gradually regained her confidence.

=== Rikka Minamoto (源 立夏, Minamoto Rikka) / Liselotte Cretia (リーゼロッテ = クレティア, Rīzerotte Kuretia) ===
Voiced by: Nao Tōyama (Japanese); Jenny Yokobori (English)
Liselotte Cretia is the youngest child and only daughter of Duke Cretia, a prominent Noble household in Galarc Kingdom. She graduated from the royal academy after skipping grades several times and founded an international enterprise at the age of 15. She is the governor of Amande, one of the most prosperous cities in the Galarc Kingdom. Liselotte possesses the memories of Rikka Minamoto, a high school girl from Japan that also died in the accident with Haruto and Suzune. She first encountered Rio when he visited her business while he was a fugitive. He was unaware that the clerk serving him was Liselotte herself. Liselotte produced modern items with the intention of encountering other reincarnated people, and Rio was suspicious of this. Liselotte views Haruto as a capable man, unlike any noble she has met, and is awed by him. After Haruto received his title, Liselotte attempted to connect with him. She accompanied Haruto when he escorted Christina to Galarc. Liselotte finally confessed to her reincarnation, and Haruto told her that he trusted her more than anyone else in Galarc and he intends to keep their relationship more casual, which makes her happy.

== Nobles ==
=== Roanna Fontaine (ロアナ = フォンティーヌ, Roana Fontīnu) ===
Voiced by: Sayaka Kaneko (Japanese); Courtney Meeker (English)
Roana Fontaine is a noble girl of the Duke Fontaine house from Beltrum, a house famed for magic research and high aptitude for magic. During her childhood, she was Christina and Flora's playmate and friend, but she always kept a respectful distance due to the difference in status between them. During her time at the academy together with Christina, she became the class representative and her school grades were always just under Christina's and Rio's. She always kept her distance from Rio, and when she met him again as Haruto she respected him as her and Flora's savior. They treat each other cordially but they are not close. Later she escapes the kingdom together with Princess Flora and joins the founded Restoration group as the hero's attendant and now as Hiroaki's fiancée.

=== Alfred Emerle (アルフレッド = エマール, Arufureddo Emāru) ===
Voiced by: Kenji Hamada (Japanese); Gabe Kunda (English)
Earl Emal's second son, renowned as the strongest knight in Beltrum and titled "The King's Sword", commands the royal guard after taking over from Helmut Arbor. Tasked with leading the forces to rescue Celia, he fights Rio but ultimately retreats after being outmatched. Later, he's ordered by the king to protect Christina after her escape, though he struggles with conflicting duties, uncertain whether to bring her back or ensure her safe passage to Rodania, risking his loyalty and family's safety. He hesitates to fight Christina's group seriously and is eventually defeated and captured by Rio. The next day, he shares with Rio the events leading to the fall of the Orgueille house.

=== Charles Arbor (シャルル = アルボー, Sharuru Arubō) ===
Voiced by: Atsushi Tamaru (Japanese); Blythe Melin (English)
The son of Duke Helmut Arbor. He was the royal guard's vice commander until Flora's kidnapping, he tried to force Rio to falsely confess to being Flora's kidnapper and torturing him just a way to protect his position or avoid embarrassment. Flora woke up on time and caught Charles, confirming Rio as her savior. Enraged by his intentions, Charles is demoted from the royal guard. He would then use a secret pact with Reiss to take control of a new knight order and try forcing Celia to marry him after accusing her father of treason. Currently, he is made a prisoner of war after being captured by Haruto, unaware that he is Rio.

=== Lucius Orgueille (ルシウス = オルグィーユ, Rushiusu Orugwīyu) ===
Voiced by: Kohsuke Toriumi (Japanese); Matt Shipman (English)
A major antagonist. The man who murdered Rio's mother. Lucius was the heir of the Orgueille household with an undeniable sword talent, but was very low-ranked and unappreciated by other nobles, which led to his family's downfall. Alfred describes Lucius as someone who lacks consciousness and can be his rival. Lucius left young Rio alive in the slums expecting to see him again that proved to be a fatal mistake when the adult Rio easily killed him.

=== Reiss Vulfe (レイス = ヴォルフ, Reisu Vorufu) ===
Voiced by Kōji Yusa;Connor Colquhoun (English)
The series' primary antagonist, Reiss is an ambassador from the Proxia Empire and since has conspired to start a war in the Strahl region for unknown reasons. He used several aliases to execute his goal. His plans are usually derailed by Rio's interference. One of his associates is Lucius. Charles Arbor is easily deceived by Reiss's flattery. Reiss possesses knowledge from thousands of years ago.

=== Gustave Huguenot (ギュスターヴ = ユグノー, Gyusutāvu Yugunō) ===
Voiced by: Seiro Ogino
Head of the Huguenot family, a highly ambitious noble in his forties seeking to control the Bertram Kingdom from behind the scenes. His first son Stewart pressured him to frame Rio as a threat to the kingdom and sent his own daughter, Latifa, as an assassin after him. Driven by hunger for influence, Gustave aims to make Flora and Hiroaki puppet rulers, with him effectively controlling the kingdom. Though not desiring the throne himself, Gustave works tirelessly to shape the kingdom's policies for his own benefit. Despite Christina's warnings about provoking Rio, Gustave initially planned to exploit Celia to recruit Rio's group. However, realizing Rio's powerful connections and influence over allies like Liselotte and the Galarc Kingdom, he reconsidered his approach. After Flora and Elise Brandt tell Gustave that Stewart had lied about Rio being a criminal at the royal academy, he disowns Stewart as he brought shame to the family for his incompetence. While wary, Gustave remains determined to secure Rio's allegiance to Restoration, understanding the potential risks of making him an enemy.

=== Aria Governess (アリア = ガヴァネス, Aria Gavanesu) ===
Voiced by: Ayahi Takagaki (Japanese); Madeleine Norton (English)
Liselotte's head maid, chief vassal, and her most trusted aide, whom she serves as her great chamberlain and personal escort, the strongest of all of her retainers. She has great fighting ability and is known as "The Reaping Princess" for her ability to wield a magic sword. Aria was good friends with Celia in her days at the academy.

== Summoned ==
=== Aki Sendo (千堂 亜紀, Sendō Aki) ===
Voiced by: Marika Kōno (Japanese); Emi Lo (English)
In Japan, she is Haruto's half-sister and always felt special with him and Miharu. After her mother's husband discovered that Aki wasn't his daughter, he divorced her mother and took Haruto with him. They lived alone for several years until her mother got remarried to Takahisa and Masato's father. Aki's begging for Haruto's return never came and her devotion for him turned to hatred. On her first day at middle school when Aki was going back home along with Miharu and Masato, she got dragged into Satsuki and Takahisa's hero summoning. She, Miharu, and Masato appeared on grassland near the border of the Galarc and Centostella Kingdom, they walked together until they had reached a highway, where they were spotted by a slave trader that tried to kidnap them, but they were quickly saved by Rio, Haruto's reincarnation. Aki respects Rio as her savior, but when she learns about Haruto's fate, and returning to Japan seemed impossible due to the timeline differences, she shut herself in her room.

=== Masato Sendo (千堂 雅人, Sendō Masato) ===
Voiced by: Aguri Ōnishi (Japanese); Madeleine Morris (English)
The second son of the man who married Haruto and Aki's mother after the divorce. On the first day of his sixth year at his elementary school, he was dragged into Takahisa and Satsuki's hero summoning. After being rescued by Rio he began to treat him as an older brother, although Masato was never told before that Haruto was his older stepbrother, as Aki considered it a taboo. He is invited to the Rock House where Rio explains everything to Miharu, Aki, and him. Masato spends his training with the inhabitants in Seirei no Tami. He later found out that Haruto is his stepbrother. Currently, he watches over Aki's rehabilitation.

=== Takahisa Sendo (千堂 貴久, Sendō Takahisa) ===
Voiced by: Tomohiro Ōno (Japanese); Jack Stansbury (English)
Takahisa is a Japanese high school student, along with his little brother Masato, and stepsister Aki. He is affiliated with Centostella to become the kingdom's Hero after being caught in a summoning together with his senior Satsuki. Takahisa started off as an upright person with a strong sense of moral justice and overprotective until coming to the other world he is shown to be insecure and possessive. He is determined to reunite with his siblings, and Miharu, whom he has a crush on, despite Satsuki's claims that they are safer where they are now. Takahisa did not pay any mind to Miharu's feelings for Rio or the fact that he had another stepbrother, Haruto.

=== Rui Shigekura (重倉 瑠衣, Shigekura Rui) ===
Rui is the Hero belonging to the Beltrum Kingdom. He is half-Japanese and half-American and the heir of a CEO company, and accompanied by his senpai Rei, classmate Kouta, and his girlfriend Akane before being summoned and dragged to the Stralh region. Just after the summoning he slowly understood the other world's language, something that eventually drives Kouta away due to inferiority complex, causing Rui to question his friendships. Rui somewhat has a collaborative and cordial relationship with military men and the other heroes. Rui would join the search party of Christina the Restoration representative.

=== Hiroaki Sakata (坂田 弘明, Sakata Hiroaki) ===
Voiced by: Hiroyuki Yoshino (Japanese); James Marler (English)
Hiroaki is a hikikomori and a college ronin despite having good grades from his high school. He expended in full reading novels, playing RPGs, one day he was summoned to the Stralh region as a Hero. Upon his meeting with Flora, and receiving an explanation from her and Duke Huguenot, Hiroaki comes to the conclusion that he is this "world's protagonist" and by inflating his ego he basically takes his time in picking up ladies. He was made part of Huguenot's entourage while he visited different influential people from the Galarc Kingdom in the search for support to his faction like Liselotte and King François. His poor performance leads Rio into proving him that daily training is necessary, and his new status does not make a Hero a map-bomb.

=== Renji Kikuchi (菊地 蓮司, Kikuchi Renji) ===
Unlike the other summoned heroes, Renji cuts ties with the Rubia Kingdom and became an adventurer affiliated with the Proxia Empire. He has a bit of the chuuni syndrome. Arrogant of the magic he is bestowed on, Renji doesn't hesitate to harm those who make fun of him. After getting brutally beaten by Lucius, Silvie the First Princess reprimands Renji of his superego, though he doesn't wish to make Silvie his enemy. When fulfilling his debt to Reiss, Renji cooperates with mercenaries until a knight (Rio) confronted them and killed Lucius, making Renji see how reckless he had always been. He soon thinks about making up with Silvie and her country.

=== Erika Sakuraba (桜葉 絵梨花, Sakuraba Erika) ===
Amongst the heroes that were summoned, Erika has the topmost position who leads the country's republic that she founded after engineering a revolt by releasing civilians from tyranny royalists and turned against them. She is regarded as a saint, possessing a divine mace; however, on her end prospects the inhabitants of the other world as convicts for robbing of her life back in Japan. Erika was a university lecturer in Japan with a lover, and due to being separated from all that, developed multiple personality disorder. Because of this, Erika takes action in provoking democrats and royalists into surrendering their power when it is necessary for world progress. If these were to fail, Erika would go so far as to kidnap important figures like Liselotte, and Rio gets involved to stop her.

== Seirei no Tami ==
=== Sara (サラ) ===
Voiced by: Hiyori Nitta (Japanese); Anjali Kunapaneni (English)
Sara is a silver wolf beastkin girl and a descendant of one of the village elders. She is head elder-to-be, thanks to possessing a contract with a mid-class spirit, a member of her village's warrior group, and one of Dryas' priestesses. When Rio began his life in the village she was ordered to live with him and Latifa, as a way of compensating Rio for the misunderstanding when he entered the village's barrier. She helped Latifa adapt to life in the village. At the same time that Rio was learning to use the spirit arts from Orphia and Ursula, she and Alma taught Latifa spirit arts, the spirit folk's language, and traditions to prepare her for normal lessons with the rest of the village's children. After being defeated by Rio after his mock battle with Uzuma, she began to learn martial arts from him. Years later, Sara, Orphia and Alma aided Miharu's group in adapting to the village and later to transport them back to the Stralh region. There they protected the Rock House, Celia, Aki, and Masato while Rio was away. After Rio and Miharu's return, they helped Rio to escort Christina's group to Rodania. She has a crush on Rio.

=== Alma (アルマ, Aruma) ===
Voiced by: Asuka Nishi (Japanese); Christina Costello (English)
Alma is an elder dwarf girl and a descendant of one of the three current head elders. She is a chief elder-to-be due to having a contract with a mid-class spirit, a member of her village's warriors group, and one of Dryas' priestesses. When Rio began to live in the village she was ordered, along with Sara and Orphia, to live with him and Latifa, and to help him and Latifa with whatever they may need. She and Sara taught Latifa spirit arts, the spirit folk's language, and traditions and prepared her for normal lessons with the rest of the village's children. After seeing how Rio defeated Uzuma she began to learn martial arts from him. Years later when Rio came back to the village she helped Miharu's group adapt to life there. Later she, Sara, and Orphia helped Rio transport them back to the Stralh region. There, the three protected the Rock House. After Rio and Miharu's return, they helped Christina's group escape from Cretia and escorted them to Rodania.

=== Orphia (オーフィア, Ōfia) ===
Voiced by: Yukina Shuto (Japanese); Jad Saxton (English)
Orphia is a high elf girl and a descendant of one of the village elders. When Rio began to live in the village she was ordered, along with Sara and Alma, to live with him and Latifa, and to help him and Latifa with whatever they may need. She and Ursula taught Rio the proper way to use spirit arts. Years later, when Rio came back to the village she helped Miharu's group adapt to life there. Later she, Sara, and Alma helped Rio transport them back to the Stralh region. There, the three protected the Rock House. After Rio and Miharu's return, they helped Christina's group escape from Cretia and escorted them to Rodania.
