= Zaghouan =

Zaghouan زغوان Zaghwan
- Town
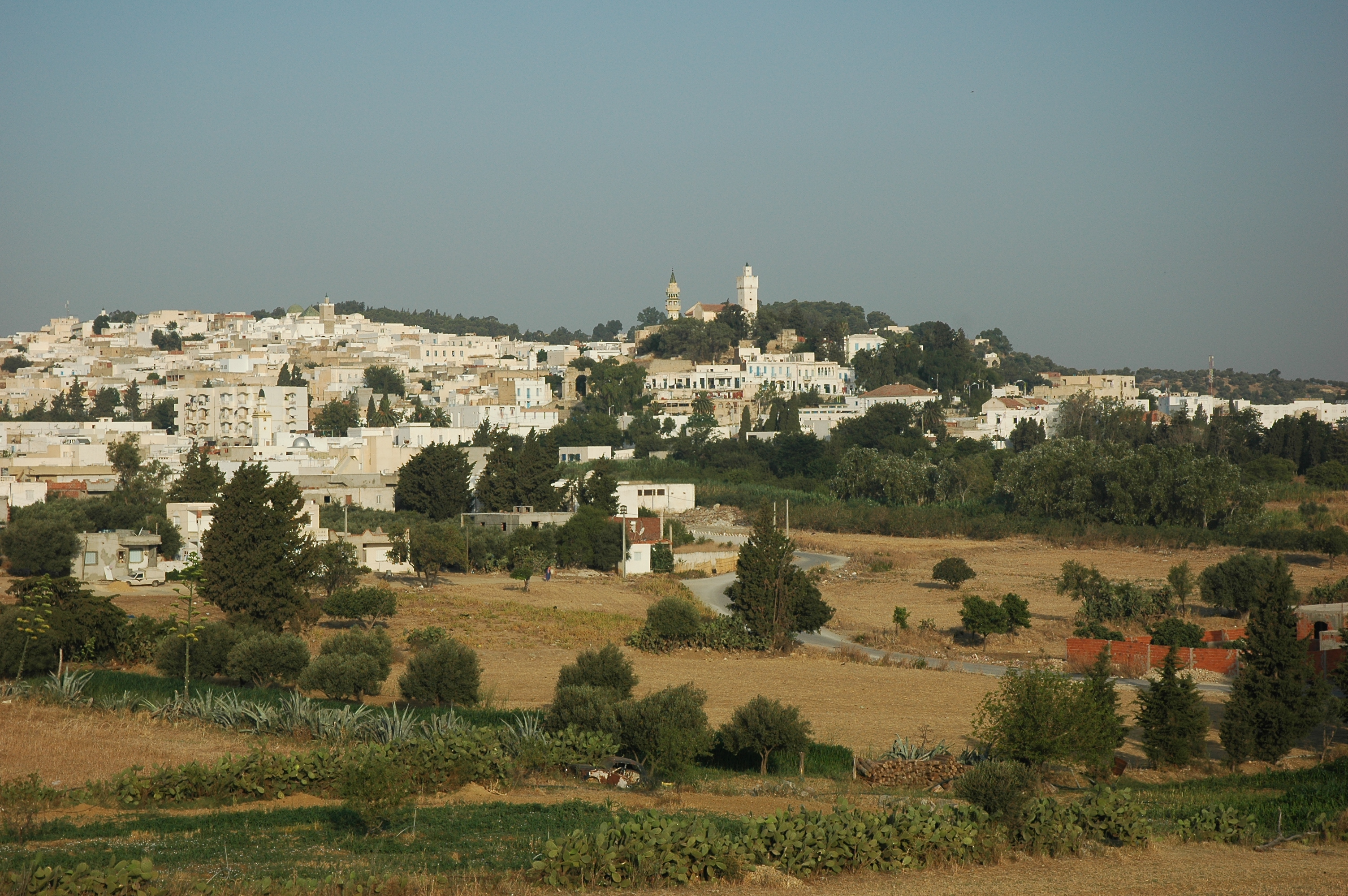
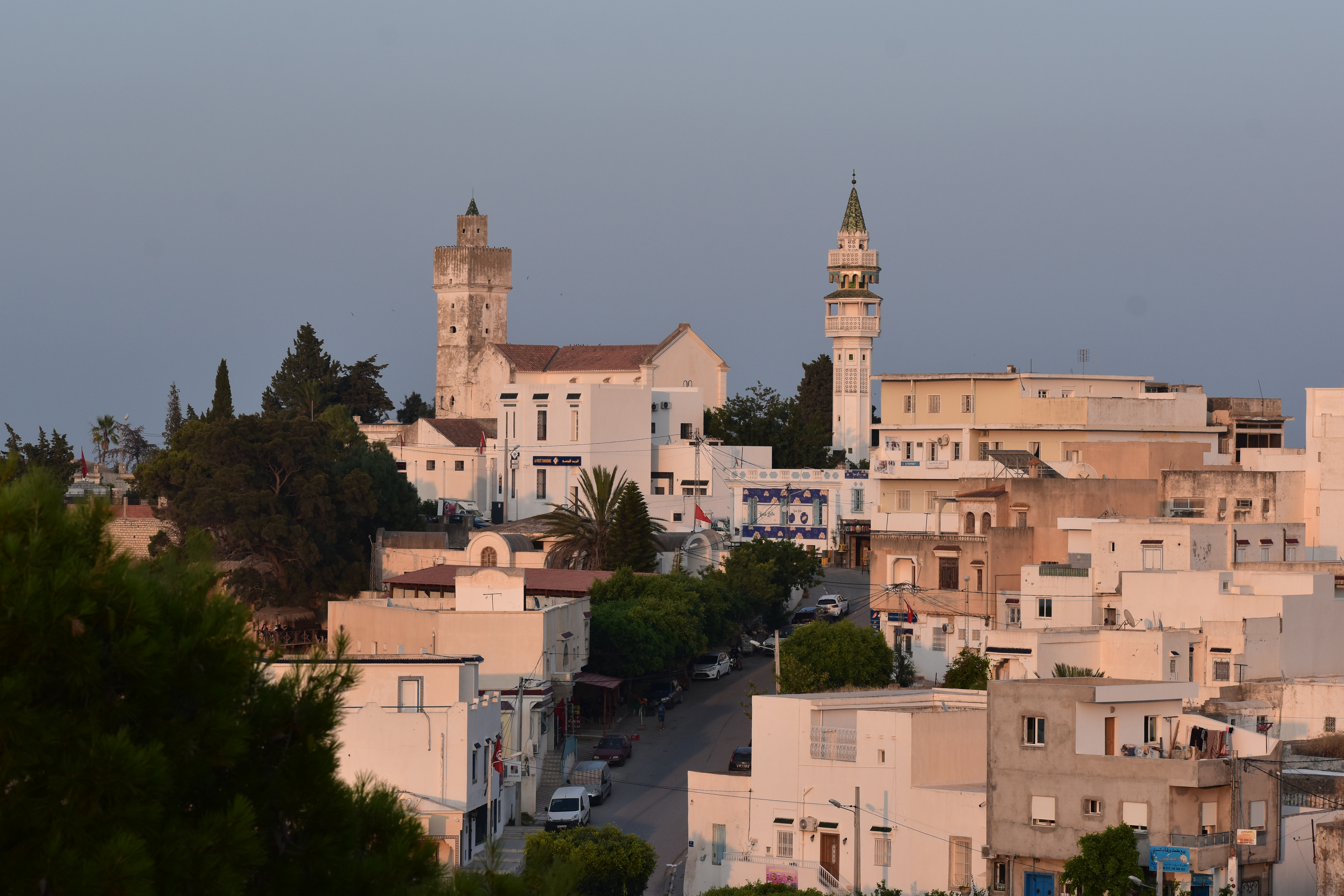
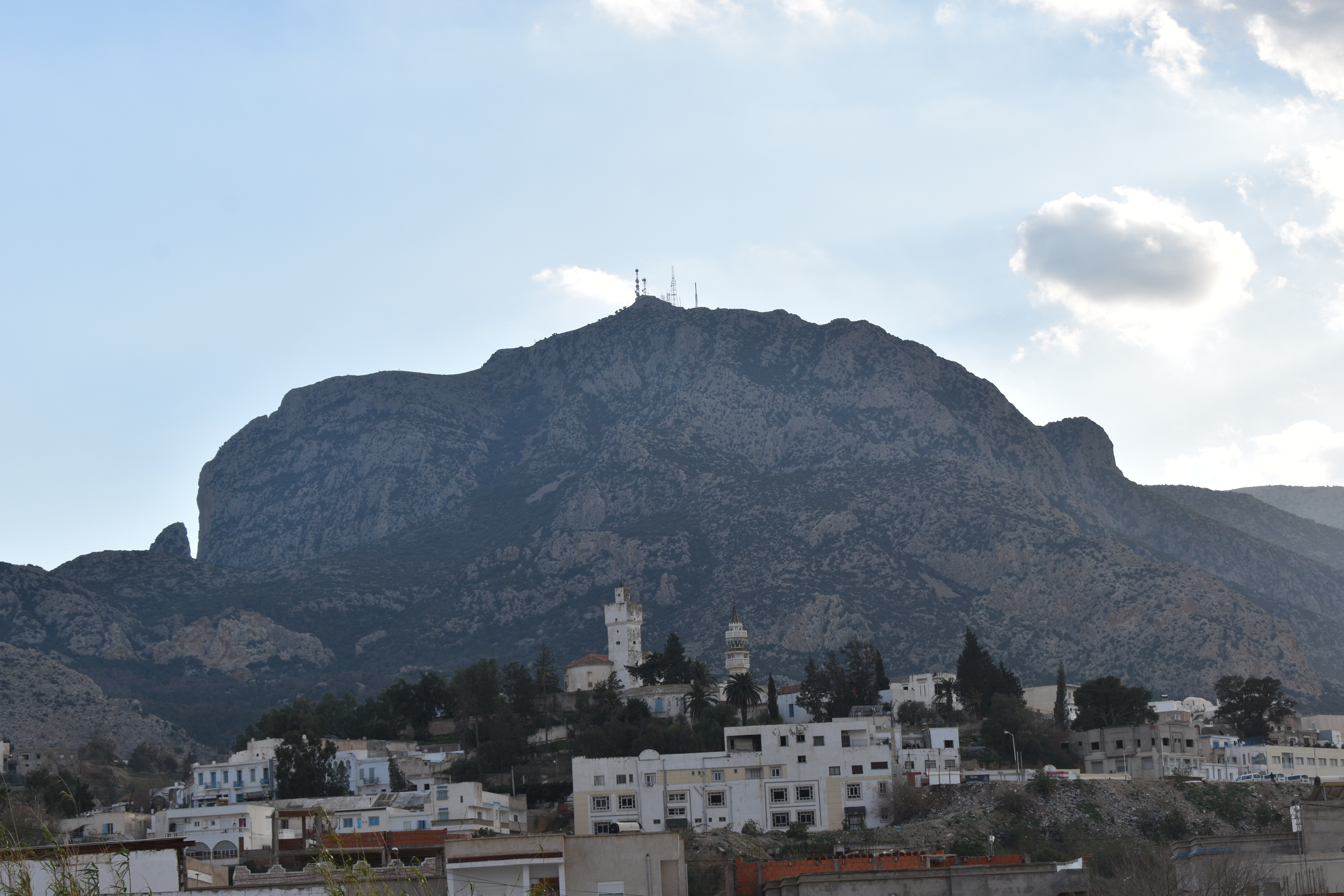
- The city of Zaghouan Skyline of Zaghouan, entrance to the old town Zaghouan's mountain behind the old city

- Location in Tunisia
- Coordinates: 36°24′20″N 10°08′35″E
- Country: Tunisia
- Governorate: Zaghouan Governorate
- Delegation(s): Zaghouan

Government
  - Mayor: Tarek Zoughari (Independent)

Population (2022)
  - Total: 22,637
- Time zone: UTC+1 (CET)

Zaghouan or Zaghwan (Arabic: زغوان, romanized: Zaġwān, pronounced [zaʁˈwɛːn]; Andalusian Arabic: إِسْطَوَان, romanized: Isṭawán) is a town in the northern half of Tunisia.

Situated on a low ridge of the Dorsale Mountains, the town has a mild climate and presents a green aspect. Cold water from here was taken by the Zaghouan Aqueduct to Carthage. The town is famous for its roses, originally cultivated by Muslim refugees from Spain in the seventeenth century. The town is located around 60 km due south of Tunis and around 50 km inland (west) from the Gulf of Hammamet and has an estimated population of around 20,837 (2014). It is the capital of the Zaghouan Governorate.

On the mountain south of the city is the Roman Water Temple Djebel Zaghouan (Temple de Eaux), source of an aqueduct which used to take water to the city of Carthage over 100 km away. The ruins here are illustrated in Fisher's Drawing Room Scrap Book, 1840, as 'Temple and Fountain of Zagwhan', the painting being by Sir Greenville Temple with a poetical illustration by Letitia Elizabeth Landon.

== Ecclesiastical history ==
=== Etymology ===
The etymology of "Zaghouan" is thought to derive from the Andalusian Arabic إِسْطَوَان (Isṭawán), which in turn comes from the Arabic أُسْطُوَانَة (usṭuwānah) meaning 'pillar'. This origin is linked to the settlement of Andalusian Moors in the area at the beginning of the 17th century. In Spanish, the term zaguán refers to a hallway or vestibule, typically serving as a transitional space between the exterior and interior of a building.

However, Zaghouan is the presumed site of the ancient city of Zica or Ziqua, which may have been the source of the modern name. The city was among the many of sufficient importance in the Roman province of Africa Proconsularis to become a suffragan diocese of the Metropolitan of Carthage, in the papal sway, yet was to fade completely, probably at the seventh century advent of Islam.

Its historically documented bishops were :

- Donatist schismatic Donatus attended the Council of Carthage in 411, where his heresy was condemned as such by the Catholic bishops, among whom Zica had no counterpart
- Vincentius intervened at the Council of Carthage in 484 called by king Huneric of the Vandal Kingdom, and was afterwards exiled like most Catholic bishops.

== Climate ==
Climate data for Zaghouan (1991–2020, extremes 1953–2017)
Month	Jan	Feb	Mar	Apr	May	Jun	Jul	Aug	Sep	Oct	Nov	Dec	Year
Record high °C (°F)	27.5 (81.5)	31.5 (88.7)	35.6 (96.1)	39.9 (103.8)	43.3 (109.9)	47.6 (117.7)	48.0 (118.4)	46.5 (115.7)	42.8 (109.0)	41.0 (105.8)	30.5 (86.9)	31.5 (88.7)	48.0 (118.4)
Mean daily maximum °C (°F)	15.8 (60.4)	16.3 (61.3)	19.2 (66.6)	22.3 (72.1)	27.3 (81.1)	32.5 (90.5)	35.7 (96.3)	36.0 (96.8)	31.0 (87.8)	26.6 (79.9)	21.0 (69.8)	16.9 (62.4)	25.1 (77.2)
Daily mean °C (°F)	10.8 (51.4)	10.9 (51.6)	13.2 (55.8)	16.0 (60.8)	20.2 (68.4)	24.7 (76.5)	27.6 (81.7)	28.2 (82.8)	24.7 (76.5)	20.7 (69.3)	15.7 (60.3)	11.9 (53.4)	18.7 (65.7)
Mean daily minimum °C (°F)	5.7 (42.3)	5.5 (41.9)	7.3 (45.1)	9.7 (49.5)	13.1 (55.6)	16.8 (62.2)	19.5 (67.1)	20.4 (68.7)	18.4 (65.1)	14.9 (58.8)	10.4 (50.7)	7.0 (44.6)	12.4 (54.3)
Record low °C (°F)	−3.0 (26.6)	−2.0 (28.4)	−2.2 (28.0)	0.4 (32.7)	3.0 (37.4)	6.5 (43.7)	9.5 (49.1)	10.4 (50.7)	7.3 (45.1)	5.0 (41.0)	0.1 (32.2)	−3.0 (26.6)	−3.0 (26.6)
Average precipitation mm (inches)	64.5 (2.54)	42.6 (1.68)	45.5 (1.79)	45.0 (1.77)	27.7 (1.09)	10.3 (0.41)	4.5 (0.18)	19.2 (0.76)	49.2 (1.94)	48.3 (1.90)	43.5 (1.71)	59.4 (2.34)	459.5 (18.09)
Average precipitation days (≥ 1.0 mm)	6.6	6.4	5.6	5.6	3.7	1.6	0.5	2.1	5.4	4.8	5.3	6.8	54.4
Average relative humidity (%)	75.0	75.0	71.8	66.9	62.9	56.4	50.8	53.4	62.8	67.6	70.8	72.7	65.5
Mean monthly sunshine hours	154.6	164.1	211.3	230.6	279.0	306.7	345.2	322.4	240.1	211.1	168.7	147.2	2,781
Source 1: Institut National de la Météorologie (humidity 1961-1990, sun 1981–2010) (Note: The Station ID for Zaghounan is 12929111.)
Source 2: NOAA

== Gallery ==
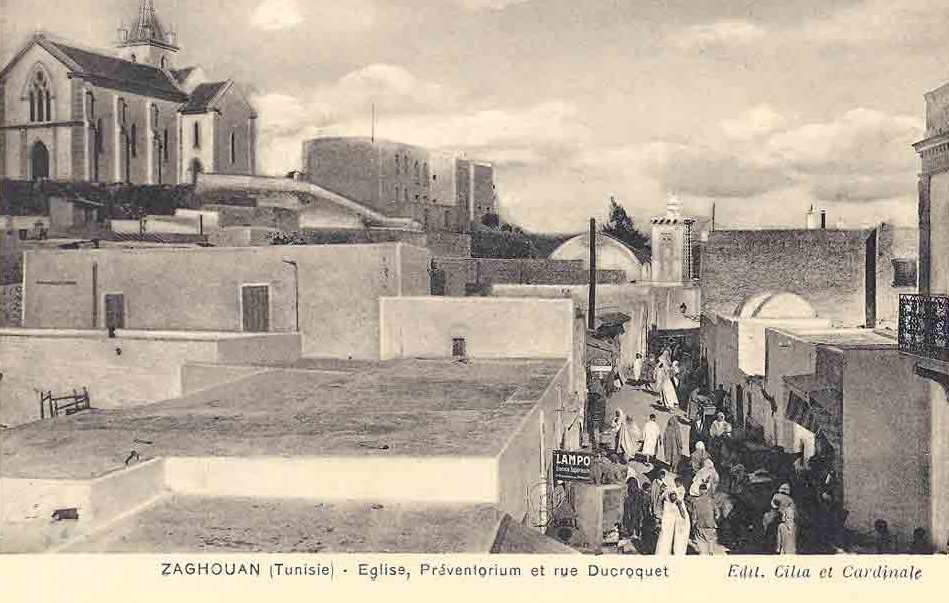
Postcard of Zaghouan in 1900

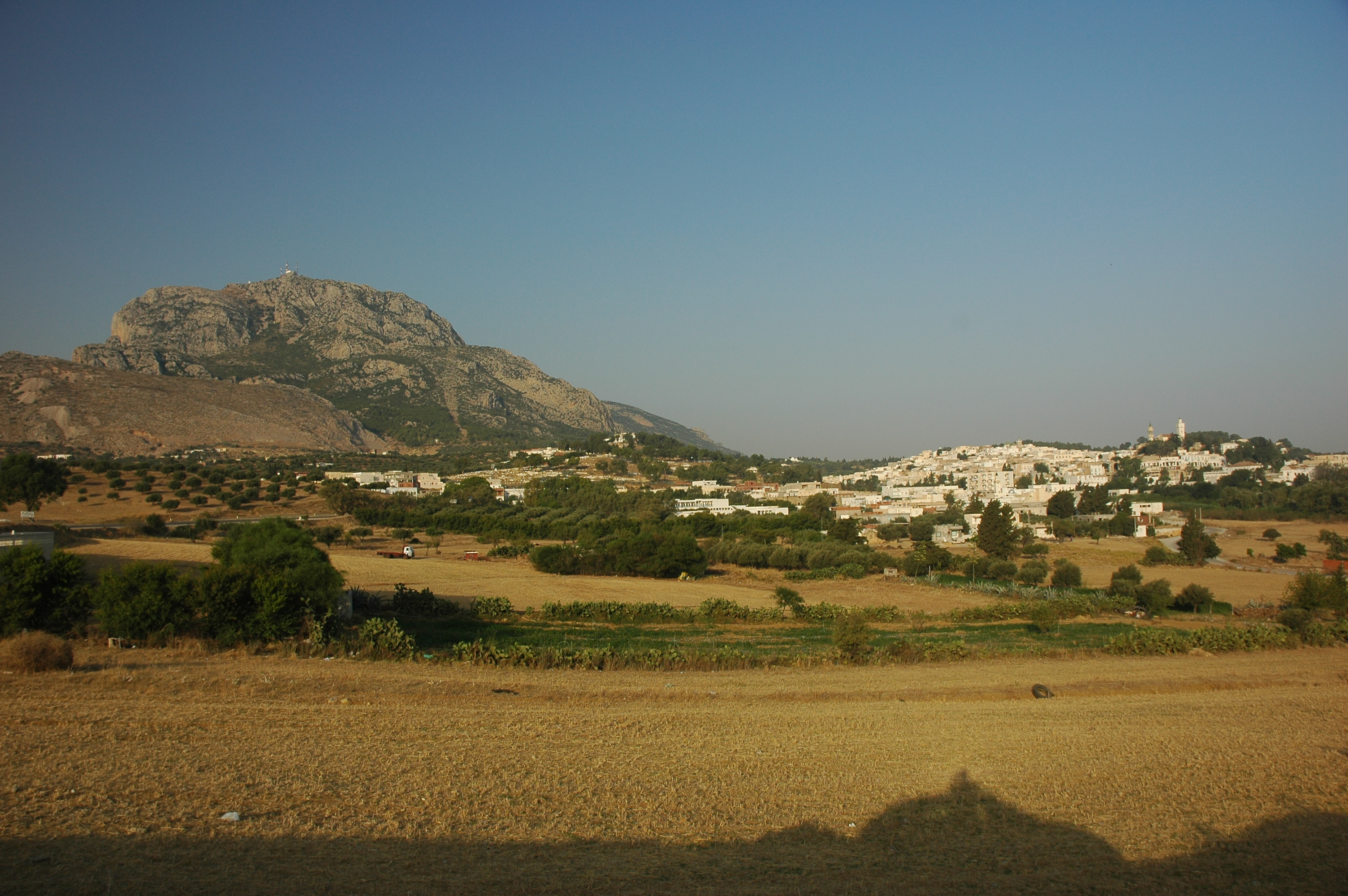
Zaghouan in Tunisia

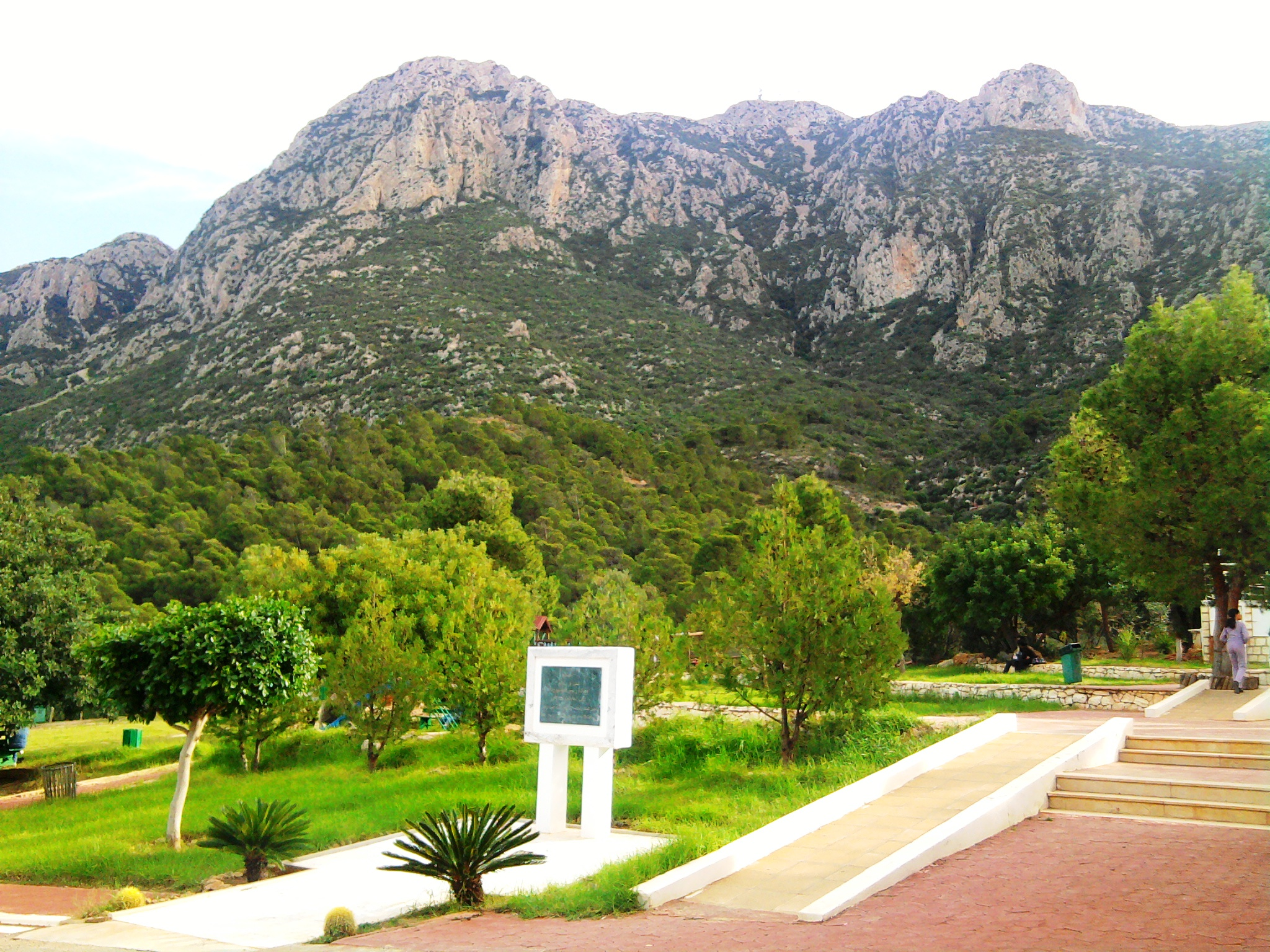
Tunisie Parc on Djebel Zaghouan

== See also ==
- List of Catholic dioceses in Tunisia

== Sources and external links ==
- GCatholic - (former &) titular see of Zica

Bibliography - Zica bishopric

- J. Mesnage, L'Afrique chrétienne, Paris 1912, pp. 237–238
