= Al-Mamoun High School =

High school in Aleppo, Syria

- ثانوية المأمون
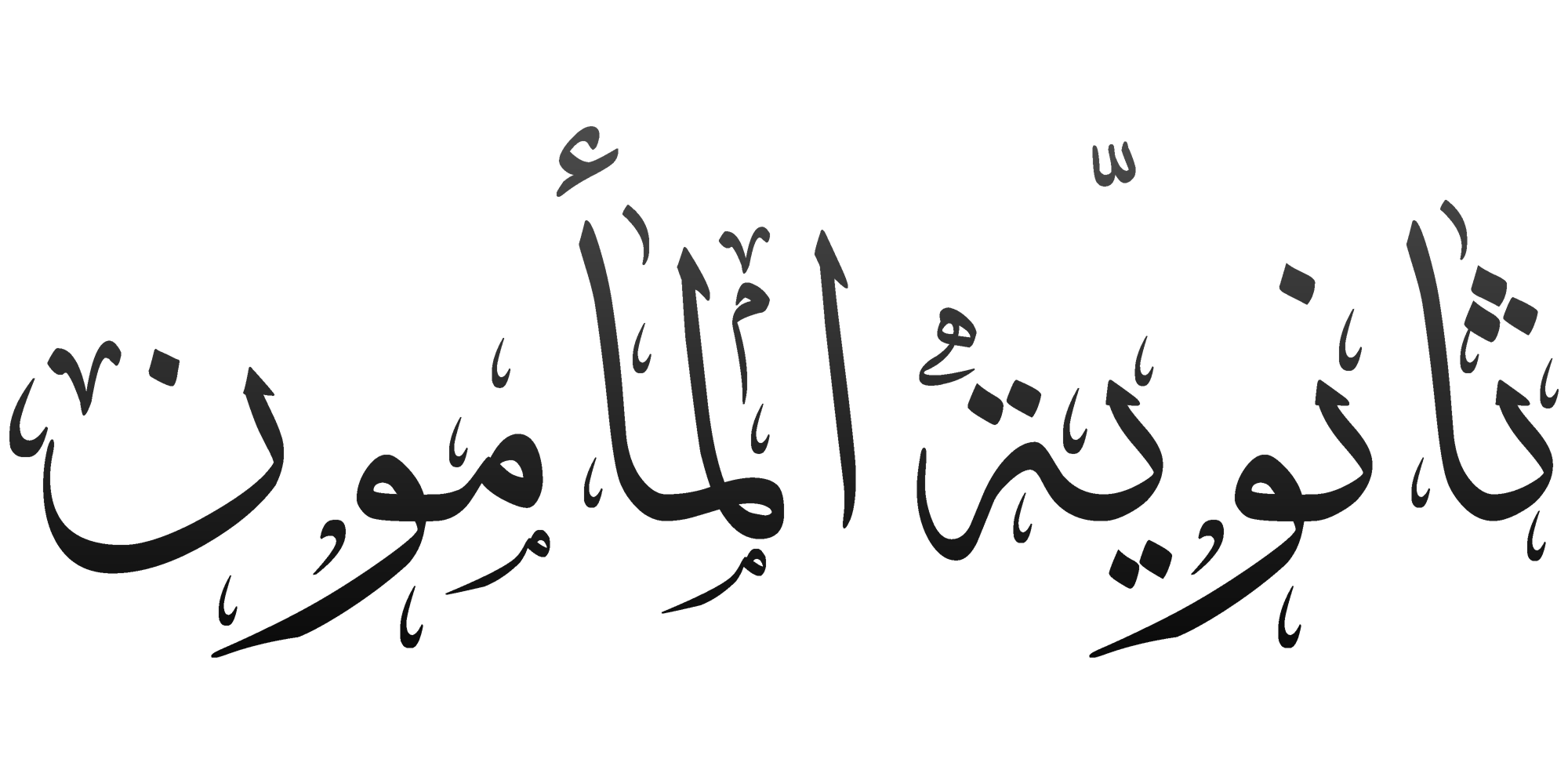

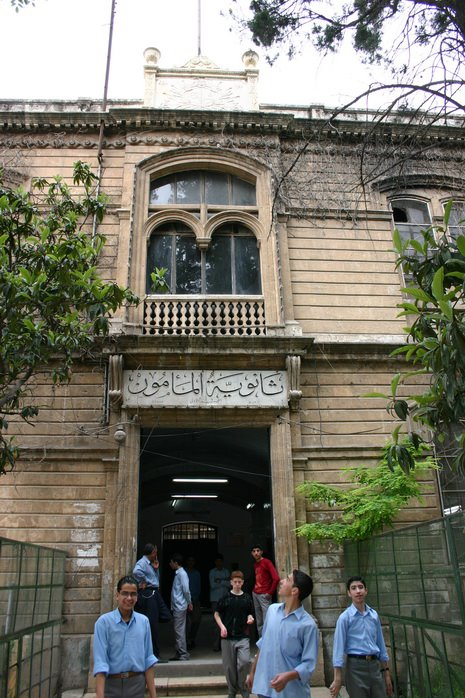
- Entrance of the main building of the school

Location
- 36.2034763°N 37.1422011°E

Information
- Type: Public High School
- Established: 1892
- Status: Open
- Principal: Hasan Salim
- Grades: 10–12
- Campus type: Urban

Al-Mamoun High School is an educational institution in Aleppo, Syria. Established in 1892, the school has a long history, producing notable figures in literature, science, and the arts. Its services still continue despite the Syrian Civil War.

== History ==
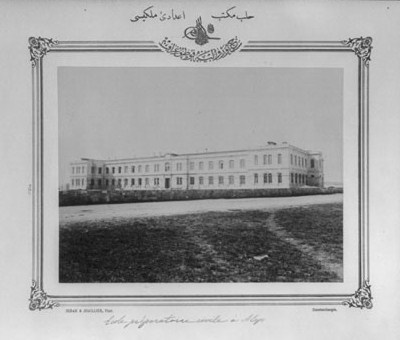

The school, originally named the Preparatory Center (Note: The word "مكتب" in Arabic generally means "office", but here it means a place of writing and books, so it is translated as "Center".)(Arabic: المكتب الإعدادي), was officially inaugurated on 23 September 1892. Located in the Jamilieh district of Aleppo, it was the first of its kind to teach modern sciences to students from Aleppo as well as other areas, including Antioch, Malatya, Hama, Latakia, and the Euphrates region. In 1912, the school was renamed the Sultani Center (Arabic: المكتب السلطاني). Later, in 1920, it became known as Aleppo Preparatory (Arabic: تجهيز حلب), merging with the Teachers' House in 1933. The current name, Al-Mamoun High School, was adopted in 1947 by the then-principal Abdel-Ghani Al-Joudeh after the Teachers' House was separated from it.

=== Student activism ===
Al-Mamoun has a history of activism, serving as a center for student movements. During the French Mandate, students organized protests against authorities and boycotted visits by French officials. The school also played a role in anti-separatist demonstrations following Syria's 1961 secession from the United Arab Republic.

== Architecture ==
Al-Mamoun's architectural style combines elements from Ottoman and local Syrian designs. Built on waqf land over three hectares, the original building was completed in 1892 under the supervision of a German engineer using stone, lime, and iron. It was designed like a latin "E" letter shape by a French architect. The structure reflects the grandeur and dignity of educational institutions of its time, with a spacious interior featuring high ceilings, large windows, and an iron gate bearing Sultan Abdul Hamid II’s seal. Its location on a western hillside near the Queiq River was chosen for its favorable climate and proximity to the city's center.

=== Facilities ===
Al-Mamoun has the capacity to accommodate approximately 2,000 students across 30 classrooms, including specialized science labs. The school also has a library with over 4,000 books covering a range of subjects, from science to literature and history. The school’s athletic facilities include fields for football and handball, as well as spaces suitable for multiple sports.

== Record of principals ==
The school commemorates its principals since 1919 by displaying their names, along with their respective tenures, on stone slabs located on the first floor. As of 2024, all individuals who have held the position of principal have been men.

== Notable alumni and educators ==
=== Alumni ===
Throughout its history, Al-Mamoun has educated numerous prominent figures, including:

- Abd al-Salam al-Ujayli, a doctor, novelist, and politician.
- Salah Duhni, filmmaker.
- Haitham Haqqi, filmmaker.
- Hassib Kayali, writer.

=== Educators ===
- Suleiman al-Issa, a poet who had also been the editor of the first student magazine published at the school in 1950.
