= Amal =

Amal may refer to:

- Amal (airline), a Malaysian charter subsidiary of Malaysia Aviation Group, focused on Hajj and Umrah travel
- Amal (given name), people named with the name
- Åmål, a small town in Sweden
- Amal Movement, a Lebanese political party
  - Amal Militia, Amal Movement's defunct militia
- Amal language of Papua New Guinea
- Amal (2007 film), directed by Richie Mehta
- Amal (2023 film), directed by Jawad Rhalib
- Amal (carburettor), a UK motorcycle carburetor
- Amal International School, Sri Lanka
- Amal Women's Training Center and Moroccan Restaurant, Marrakesh, Morocco
- Amal dynasty, a Goth dynasty which later became the royal dynasty of the Ostrogoths
- Amal Salam Zgharta FC, a Lebanese football club
- Al Amal orbiter on the Emirates Mars Mission
- Little Amal, a giant puppet

== See also ==
- Amahl and the Night Visitors, a 1951 opera in one act by Gian Carlo Menotti
- Alamal (disambiguation), for al-Amal, el-Amal, and variation
- EMAL (disambiguation)
