= La Justice (Tunisian newspaper) =

La Justice is a Tunisian francophonic Jewish newspaper founded in 1909 by Mardochée Smaja. The main goal behind this journal was the advocacy for political and juridic emancipation of the Jewish community in Tunisia and its right to the French neutralisation.

== History ==
The paper played a major role in giving visibility to the Jewish opinion. Comparing to the other newspapers of its kind, La Justice was considered as the journal of the modernist part of the Jewish activists. Most of its content was written by Tunisian intellectuals who studied in French universities.

When its members joined the executive board of the community's council in 1934, the newspaper became very popular and successful. Yet, like many others, its activity stopped after World War II with the arrival of the Vichy regime.

Among its editorial community members were Serge Moati, an SFIO activist, one of its editors-in-chief.

== Official positions ==
=== Internal policy ===
La Justice was a supporter of the concept of religion and the Tunisian politics separation, based in its argument on the Turkish Jews example, who refused to accept on 25 November 1925, the article 42 in the Lausanne Treaty according to which non-Muslim minorities in Turkey could benefit of some extra privileges related to their family and personal status. The Turkish Jews chose to keep the same rights and duties as all the other Turkish citizens. The article published in La Justice elaborating this point of view was called "An example to follow in Tunisia".

=== Zionism ===
The newspaper's position regarding Zionism changed with time. Initially, it provided the Zionist movement leaders with space to share their news and calls such as the ones for Keren Kayemet le-Israël, and the conferences of Keren Hayesod's emissaries who came to Tunisia. Yet, in the middle of the 20s, when it started to express directly its support for the Tunisian Jews' French neutralisation, tensions were created between La Justice's community and Zionism.

=== French neutralisation ===
La Justice was the main representative of the modernist part of Tunisian Jewish activists. It expressed clearly its attachment to France and advocated on several occasions for the right in French neutralization. This position created conflict with the Tunisian nationalists and even the Zionists for whom the French neutralization was a danger for the Jewish identity. Apart from the aim for political French belonging, the journal tried a create a cultural one as well for its readers. That is why it led many campaigns to encourage the community, or at least its French-speaking bourgeois minority, to play sports and scouting.
