= Al-'Amal (Aden) =

Yemeni newspaper

Al-'Amal (in Arabic العمل) was a weekly newspaper published in Aden from 1957. Al-'Amal was the organ of the Aden Trade Union Congress (ATUC). The newspaper was only allowed to print 1,500 copies weekly by the authorities. The newspaper carried the slogan 'Freedom, Bread and Peace'. After a year of existence, and had the same editor as al-Ba'ath. Al Amal was banned for having fomented dissent amongst workers.

ATUC later launched al-'Ummal (in Arabic العمال meaning The Workers) as its new organ.

Amin Al Aswadi served as the editor-in-chief of the newspaper.
