= Le Réveil juif =

- Type: Weekly newspaper
- Founder: Félix Allouche
- Editor-in-chief: Henri Maarek, Elie Louzon
- Founded: 1924
- Ceased publication: 1940
- Political alignment: Revisionist Zionist
- Language: French language
- Headquarters: Sfax, later Tunis

Le Réveil juif ("Jewish Awakening") was a French language revisionist Zionist weekly newspaper published from Sfax, Tunisia.

== History and profile ==
Le Réveil juif was founded in September 1924 by Félix Allouche. Issued on Fridays, it contained four pages.

It was one of the most important Zionist newspapers in North Africa and in Tunisia. These publications were a platform for the Jewish society to discuss their political and social views. They were also essential in the relationships between Jews, French people and Muslims.

The paper was distributed across Tunisia, Algeria, Morocco and Metropolitan France. Henri Maarek and Elie Louzon were editors-in-chief of the newspaper and its editing managers were Michel Loffreda, Jacques Taieb and Maurice Sitbon. A right-wing revisionist Zionist leader Zeev Jabotinsky published a series of articles in the weekly in 1928.

The publishing of Le Réveil juif was moved to Tunis in the mid-1930s.

Le Réveil juif, as well as other Jewish publications in Tunisia, was suppressed by the Vichy regime in October 1940.
