= École Amal =

Coordinates: 36°10′18″N 37°05′02″E

- ثانوية الأمل

Location
- Dahiet al-Thawra; Aleppo; Syria

Information
- Type: private school
- Established: 1968
- Founder: Father George Mani
- Grades: KG, 1 - 12
- Athletics: football, basketball, volleyball
- Affiliations: Melkite Greek Catholic Prelacy, Diocese of Aleppo
- Languages: Arabic, French and English

École Amal (Arabic: ثانوية الأمل) is a K-12 private school based in Dahiet al-Assad suburb of Aleppo, Syria. It is associated with the Melkite Greek Catholic diocese of Aleppo. It teaches the Syrian national curriculum. It currently has around 1500 students enrolled in grades one through twelve, and two kindergarten levels.

== History ==
École Amal was established in 1968 as a kindergarten by priest George Mani in al-Aziziyah district of Aleppo. In 1972, it was expanded to include primary education, and moved to the Sulaymaniyeh district. In 1977, the programme of the school was further expanded to include middle education (grades 7, 8 and 9). In 2000, it was relocated to its current location in Dahiet Al-Assad. The secondary education in the school was added in 2003 with the first class graduating in 2005.

After moving to their new location at Dahiet al-Assad suburb in 2000, the number of the students has grown rapidly. The second building of the school designated to accommodate the kindergarten and the primary school was completed in 2007.

The school has a small auditorium and a gymnasium. Another building is planned to be constructed for use as a monastery.
