= Al Amal (Tunisia) =

Tunisian newspaper (1934–1988)

- Type: Daily newspaper
- Founder: Neo Destour Party
- Founded: 1934
- Ceased publication: 1988
- Language: Arabic
- Headquarters: Tunis
- Country: Tunisia

Al Amal (Arabic: The Hope) was an Arabic daily newspaper published in Tunisia. It existed between 1934 and 1988.

== History and profile ==
Al Amal was established in 1934. The daily was the organ of the Neo Destour Party.

Al Amal had a sister publication, L'Action, a French daily. Both papers were headquartered in Tunis.

Al Amal folded in 1988 and was succeeded by Al Hurriya, another Arabic daily.
