= Spa architecture =

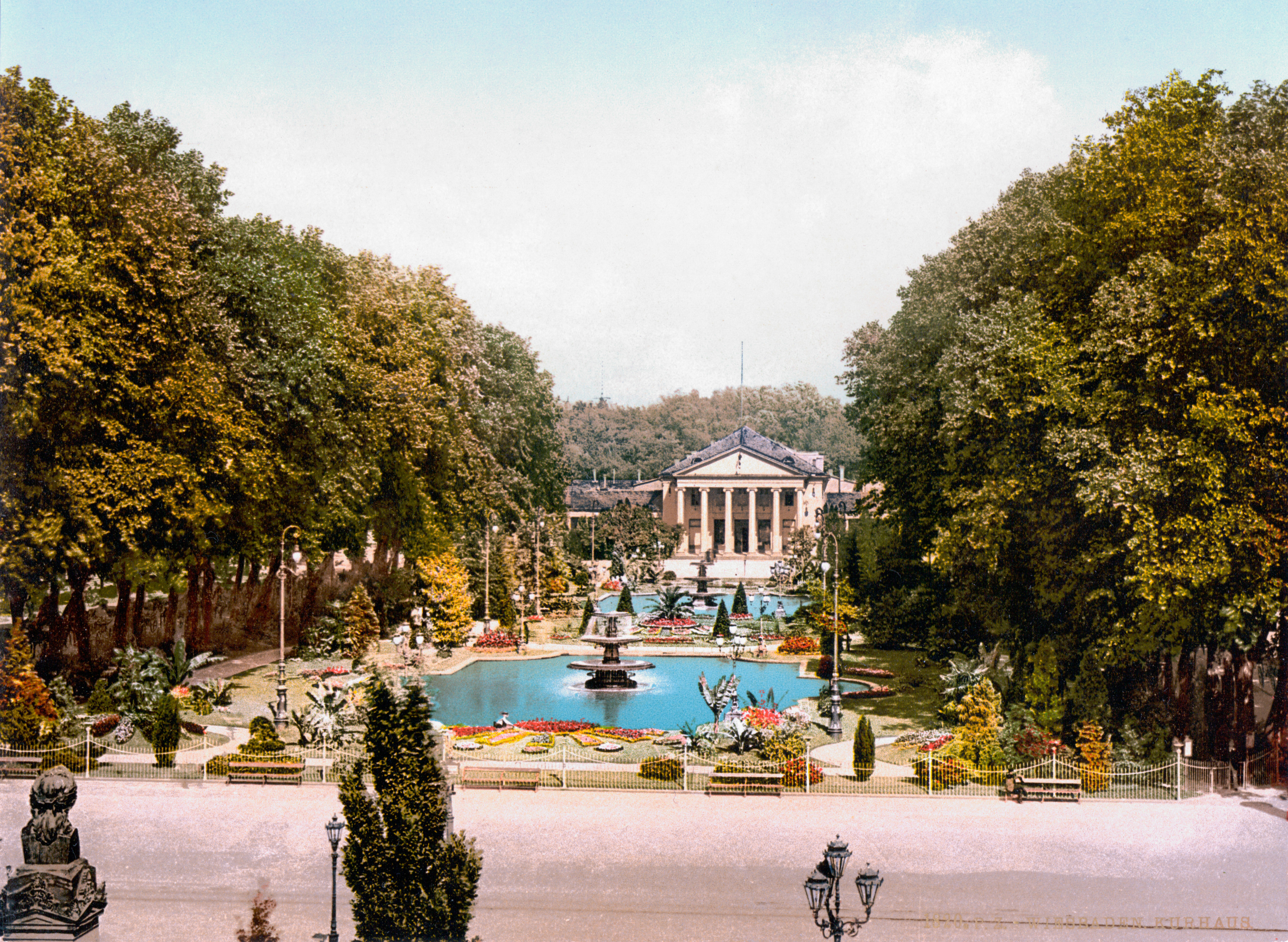
The old Kurhaus in Wiesbaden by Christian Zais

Spa architecture (German: Kurarchitektur) is the name given to buildings that provide facilities for relaxation, recuperation and health treatment in spas. The architecture of these buildings is called "spa architecture" even though it is not a uniform architectural style, but a collective term for a genre of buildings with a spa function.

This type of building first appeared in Europe in the 17th century and had its heyday in the 19th century. The term spa architecture relates especially to buildings in the healing spas inland; those on the coast, the seaside resorts, developed their own resort architecture (German: Bäderarchitektur). However, since the early 19th century there have been many parallels of architectonic expression between inland spas and coastal resort spas.

== Early predecessors in antiquity and the Middle Ages ==
There were spas even in classical antiquity. They owed their emergence to the healing properties of hot springs which were already known at that time. In the centre of Roman spas there were thermae or Roman baths, that were generally less symmetrical than the great imperial baths in their towns, such as the Baths of Diocletian and Caracalla, because they had to conform to the topography of the terrain in which the thermal springs were located. The most important Roman spa was Baiae in the Bay of Naples. In German the spas of Aachen, Wiesbaden, Baden-Baden and Badenweiler were founded in the first century A.D. In Switzerland, St. Moritz first boomed with the discovery of its healing spring by Paracelsus.

After this initial flowering, interest in bathing for healing purposes subsided for a while in Europe. No large bath complexes were built during the Middle Ages on the scale that had been seen in antiquity. The Crusaders brought Islamic spa culture back with them from the Orient. With the rise of the bourgeoisie in the towns during the 12th century, public baths were built; however they did not have their own unique architectural expression and, externally, could not be distinguished from residential town houses. The great period of public bathing culture in the Middle Ages ended with the Thirty Years' War.

== 15th to 18th centuries ==
Spa culture experienced a boom in Europe in the 15th and 16th centuries and became an important economic factor. When it gained further importance in the second of the 17th century, drinking of the waters became the fashion instead of the hitherto popular bathing culture. If a spa town could not keep pace with this development and carry out the costly building measures needed, it resorted to simpler immersion bathing facilities (the Armenbäder and Bauernbäder). Important ancient spas such as Baden-Baden and Wiesbaden were affected in this way.

In the Baroque era there were important new developments in the guise of aristocratic bathing facilities (the Fürstenbädern). Their origins could be found in the castles. The best preserved example in Germany is Brückenau. Prince-bishop Amand of Buseck began extending the town in 1747. On a terraced hill around three kilometres from the town a spa house (Kurhaus) was built. A lime avenue framed by a pavilion ran from the valley up to the palace-like building, forming a central axis. The prototype for the spa at Brückenau was the maison de plaisance of Château de Marly, which was built from 1679 to 1687 by Louis XIV.

The most important spa towns of the 18th century are not the relatively small princely baths, but Bath in England and Aachen in Germany. Both towns played a decisive part in the development of spa architecture in the 19th and early 20th centuries. Spa culture in Aachen recovered during the late 17th century from the consequences of the Thirty Years' War. A key influence here was the spa doctor, François Blondel who, through his books on balneology, made Aachen renown throughout Europe as a spa. Blondel's most important achievements were his promotion of drinking the spa waters and his assistance with the design of the new spa facilities.

Aachen developed into the leading fashionable spa on the continent and maintained this position until the French occupation period at the end of the 18th century. The most important spa building of the 18th century is the Neue Redoubt, which was built from 1782 to 1786 by the architect, Jakob Couven. As the centre of society life, the building is a direct forerunner of this type of spa house that became widespread during the 19th century.

== 19th century heyday ==
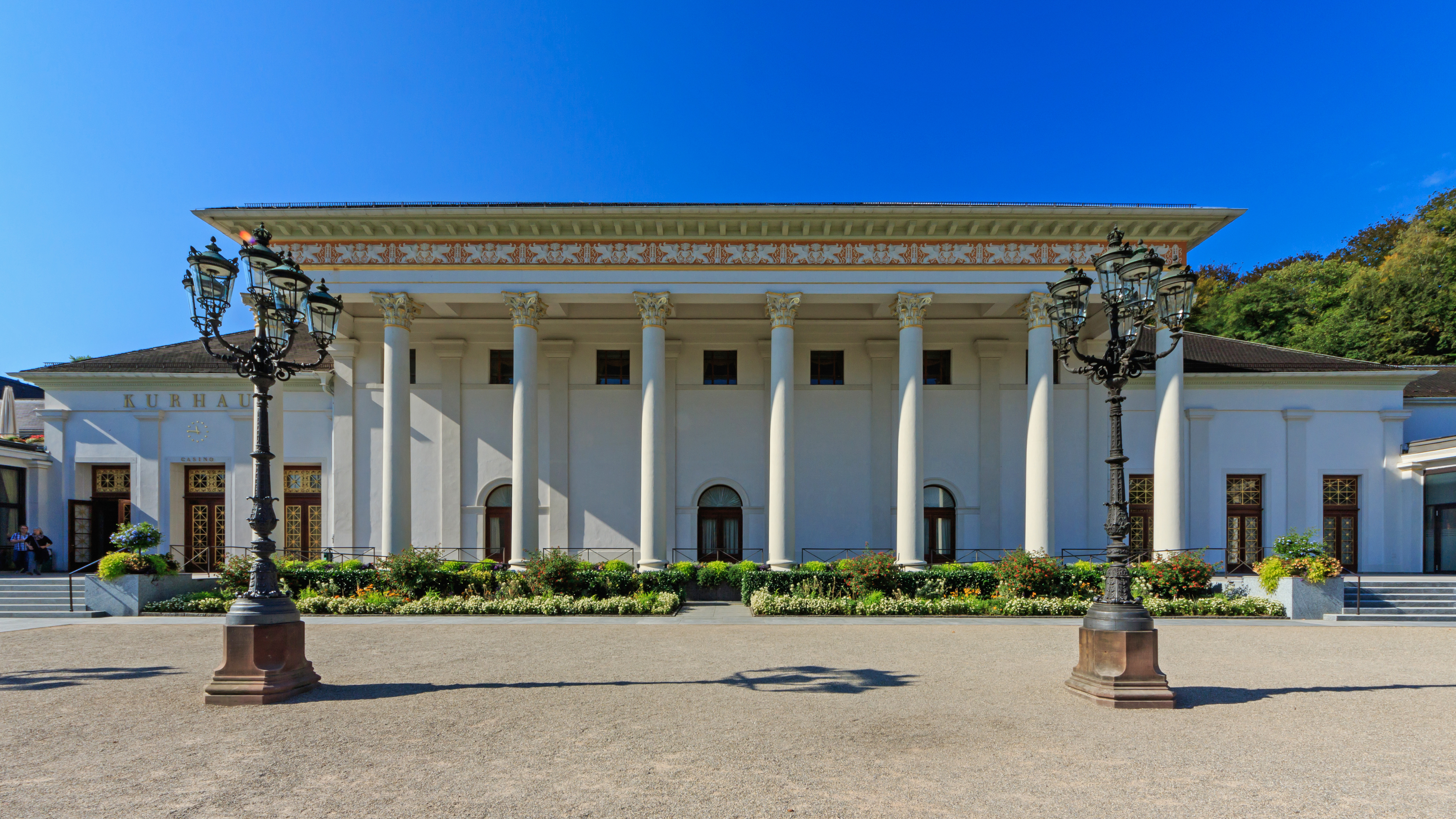
The Kurhaus of Baden-Baden

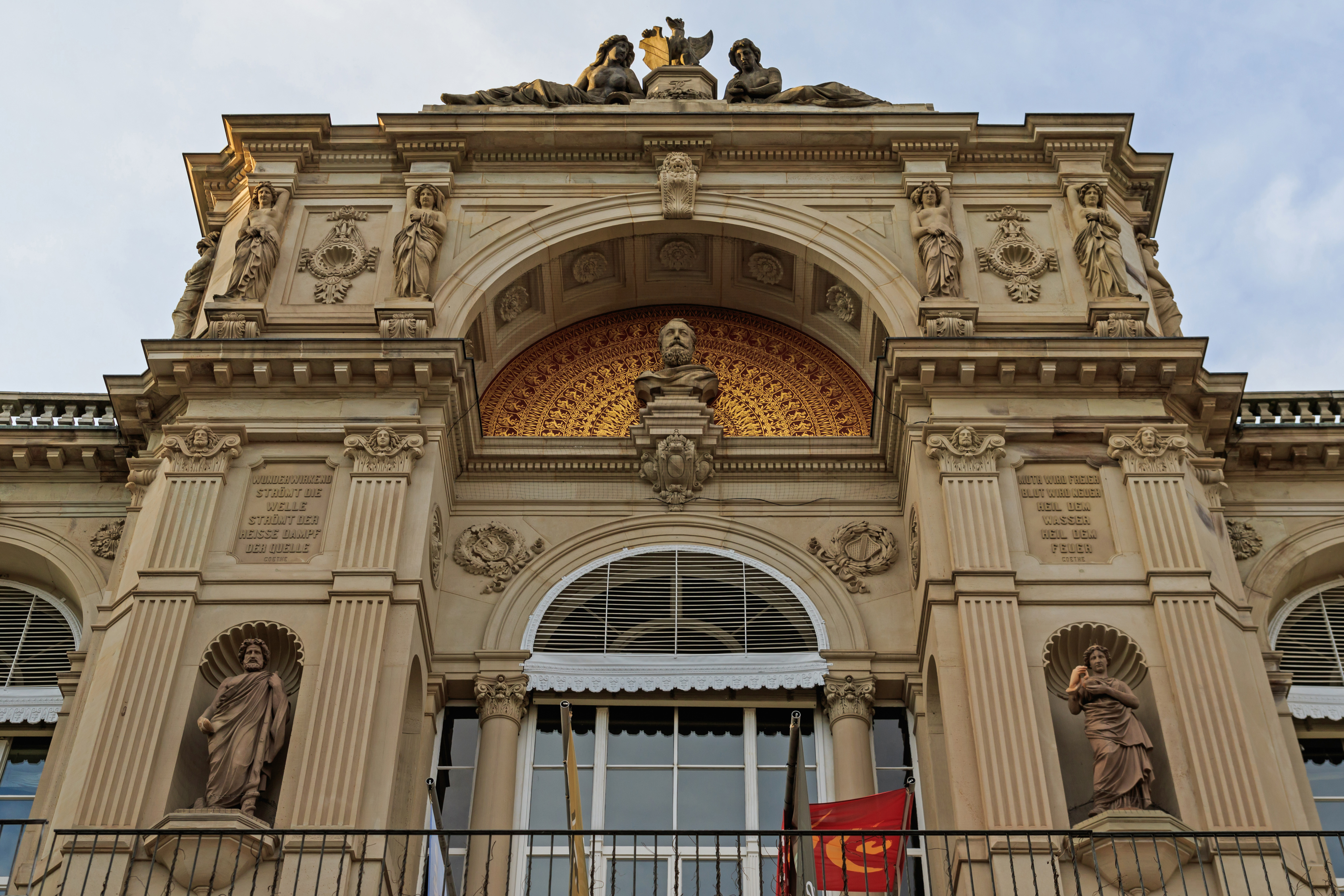
The Friedrichsbad in Baden-Baden

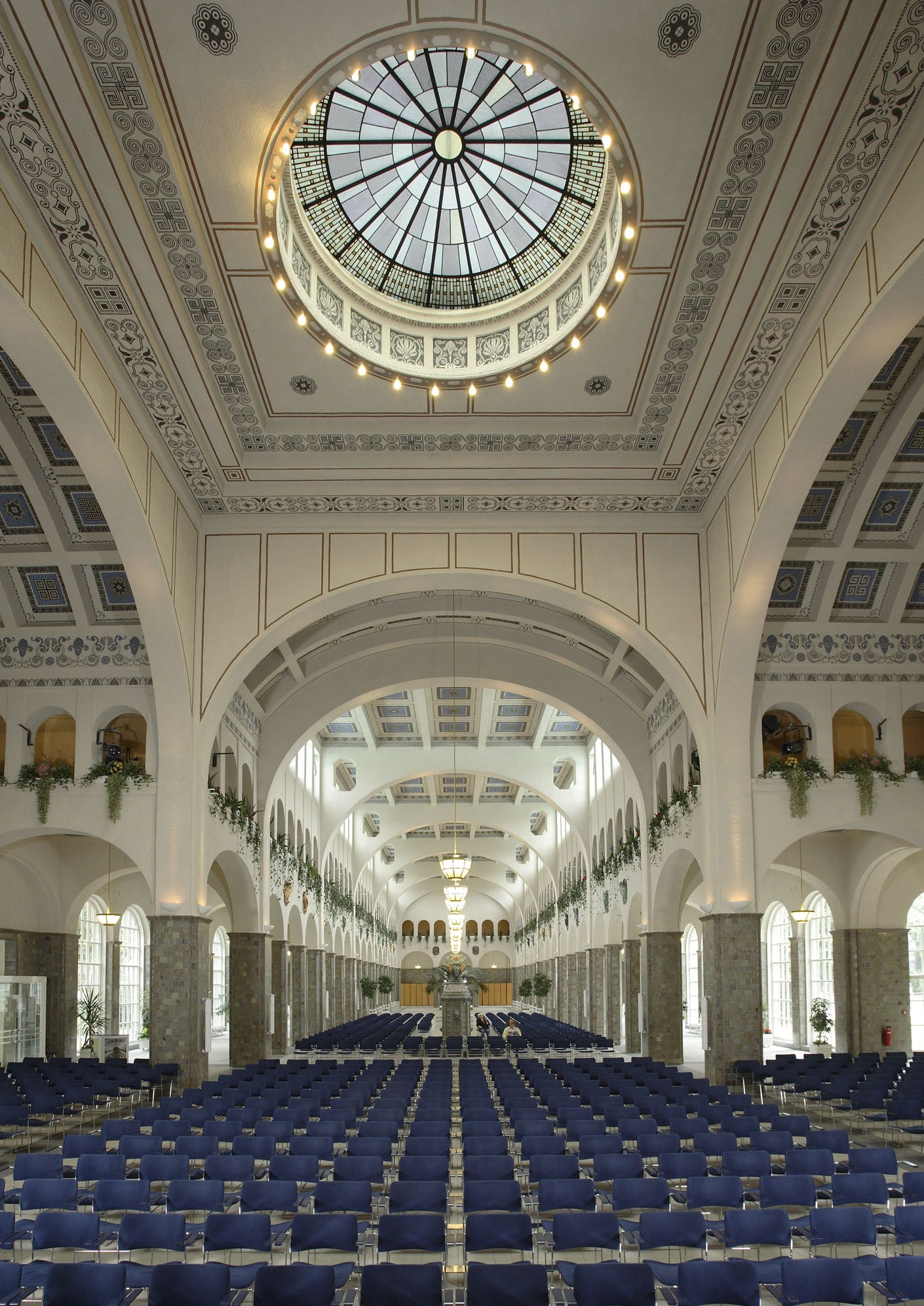
The Wandelhalle in Bad Kissingen

There was noticeable specialisation in public buildings built from about 1800. This was especially true of buildings erected for social purposes. In the spa towns there was a preponderance of buildings for education, communication and leisure to cater for the great number of guests. Specialised buildings were erected: the spa house (Kurhaus), the drinking hall (Trinkhalle) and thermal baths. In addition there were landscape gardens, hotels and villas as well as theatres, museums, cable cars and funiculars and observation towers.

Spa architecture underwent sharp specialisation in the 19th century too. The spa buildings no longer catered for all functions – such as lounges, baths, and lodgings – under one roof as had been usual during the baroque era. The Kurhaus of the 19th century is a building exclusively designed for social interaction. Baths and accommodation are located in bath houses and hotels specifically built for those purposes. In the centre of the Kurhaus is a large, ostentatious hall (the Saal). In addition, there are several side rooms for various activities; such as gaming, reading and dining.

The first Kurhaus of the new fashion was not the existing one in Wiesbaden by Christian Zais, that was built from 1808 to 1810. The oldest, surviving spa house is the Kurhaus of Baden-Baden, built in 1822-24 under the grand duke's architect, Friedrich Weinbrenner. This triple complex has a length of 140 metres with a large central hall. On its northern and southern sides it is flanked by pavilions for the theatre and restaurant. Between these three great buildings, which stand out clearly in plan view, there are galleries.

Drinking halls (Trinkhallen) originated from the springs that became widespread following the introduction of the Trinkkur, or "drinking of the waters", during the baroque period. These offered spa guests the opportunity to fill their drinking glasses with thermal water. There were thermal springs in the 17th century in all German spa towns. Pavilions were erected over the springs. Towards the end of the 18th century there was a new development: the spring houses were expanded with gallery sections. In the 19th century the drinking hall became a well-known type of building.

Great thermal baths emerged in Germany especially after the gaming ban in 1872. The spa towns invested in bath houses in order to remain attractive to spa guests. The most important thermal bath of the time was the Friedrichsbad in Baden-Baden, which was built under the direction of Karl Dernfeld. Its prototypes were the Raitzenbad in Budapest and the Graf-Eberhardsbad (today Palais Thermal) in Bad Wildbad.

The largest enclosed foyer (Wandelhalle) in Europe (3,240 square metres) with its adjoining spring hall (Brunnenhalle) in the Bavarian state spa town of Bad Kissingen forms a stylistic transition from the 19th to 20th centuries. It was built in the years 1910/1911 by architect, Max Littmann, who was commissioned by Prince Regent Luitpold.

== 20th century ==
The social Kur and the changing travel habits of people required new architectural solutions in the 20th century.

The first examples of modern spa architecture emerged in the 1930s. One of the earliest representatives of the New Objectivity is the New Drinking Hall in Bad Wildbad, which was designed in 1933 by Reinhold Schuler, an architect in the Württemberg Ministry of Finance, and Otto Kuhn, president of the Construction Department of the Treasury. The neoclassical artistic concept of the Nazi regime prevented it spreading further, however.

After 1945, with a few notable exceptions such as the Kurhaus in Badenweiler by Klaus Humpert, 1970–72 – no real successors to the spa houses, drinking halls and bath houses in their true sense have emerged.

== Photo gallery ==
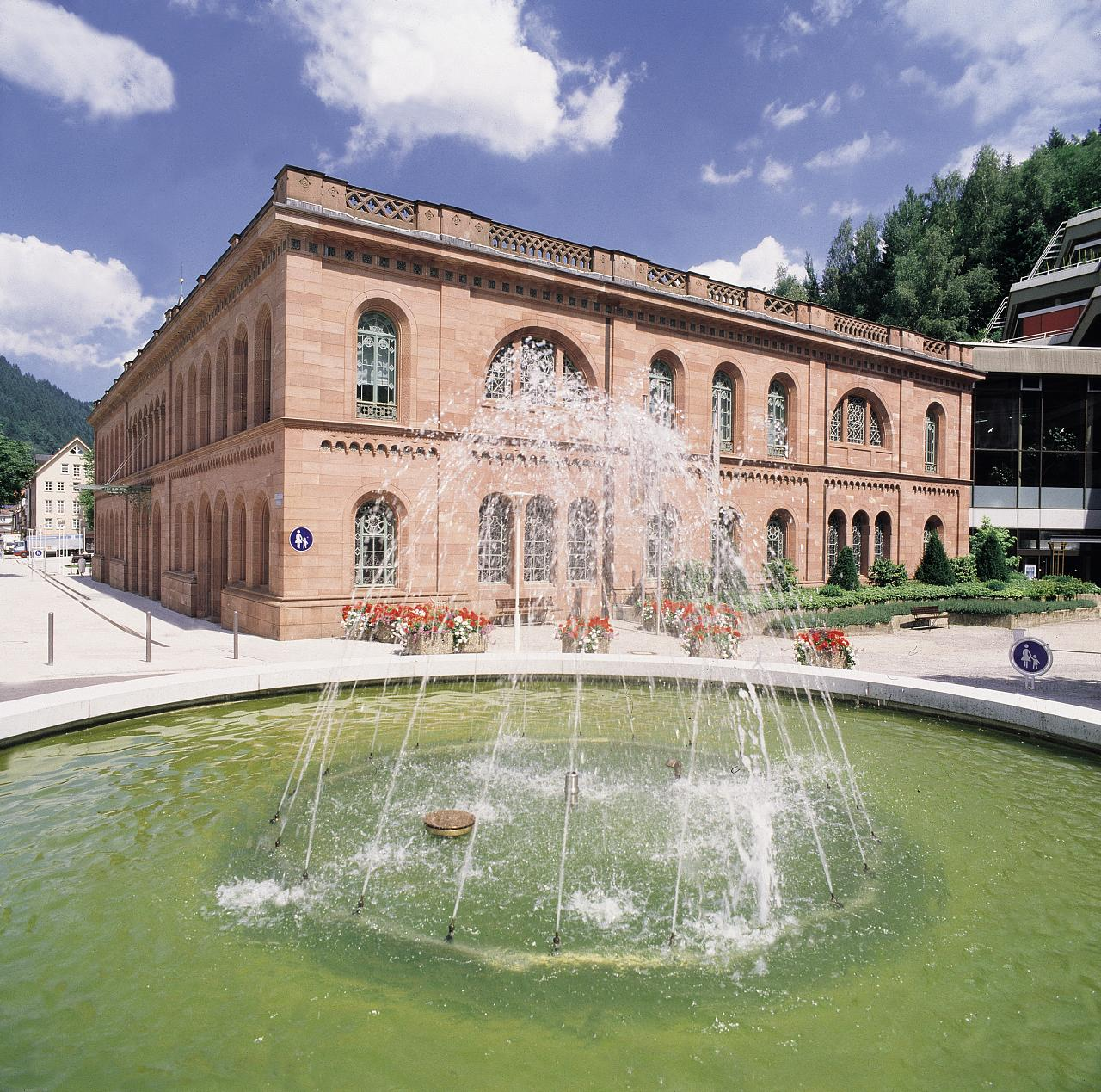
Palais Thermal in Bad Wildbad, built 1840–1847

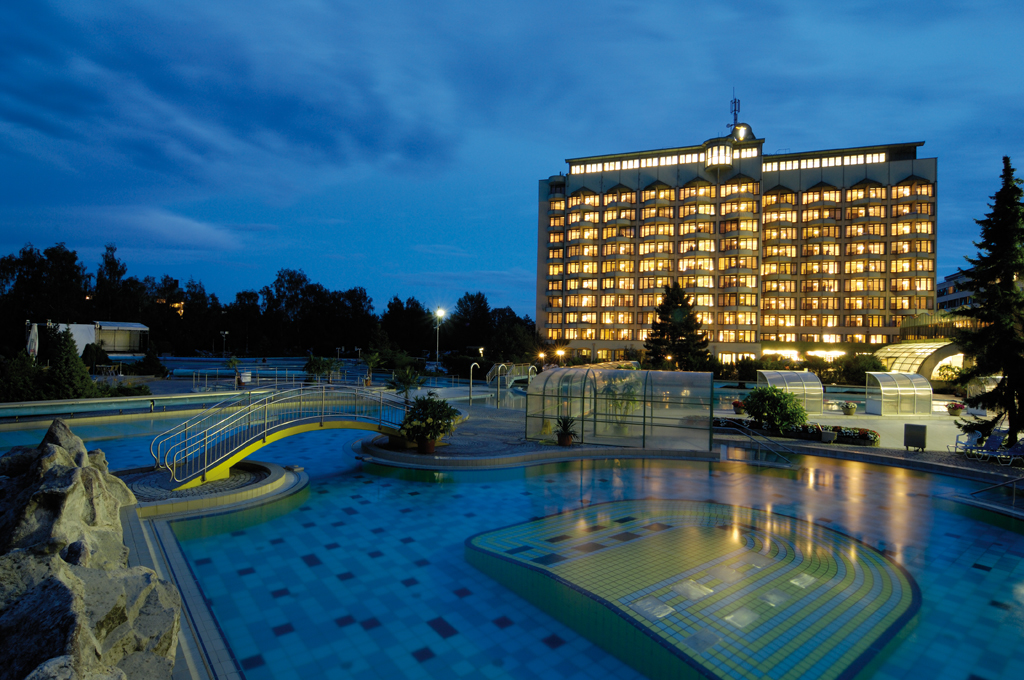
The Johannesbad in Bad Füssing

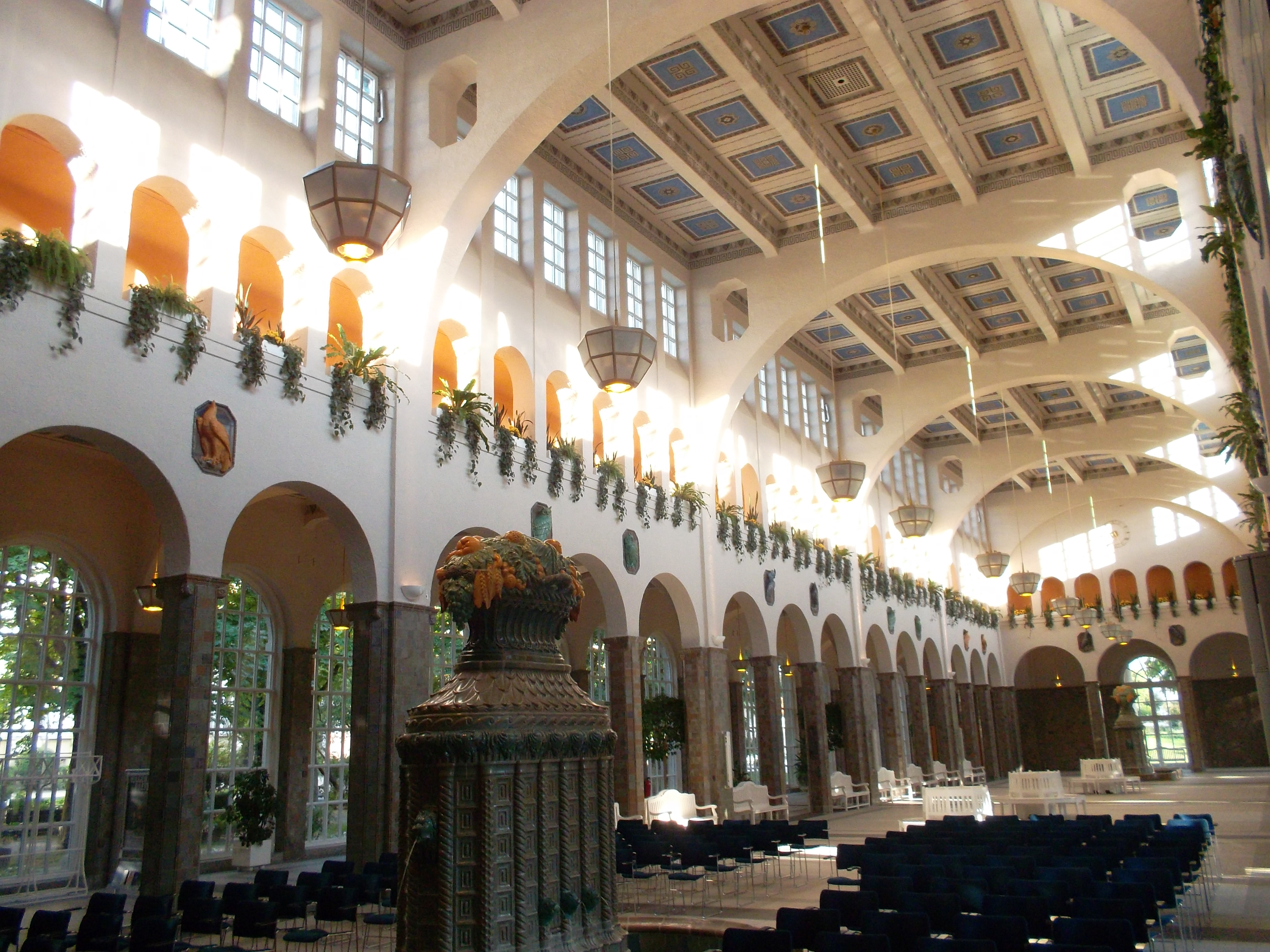
The Wandelhalle in Bad Kissingen

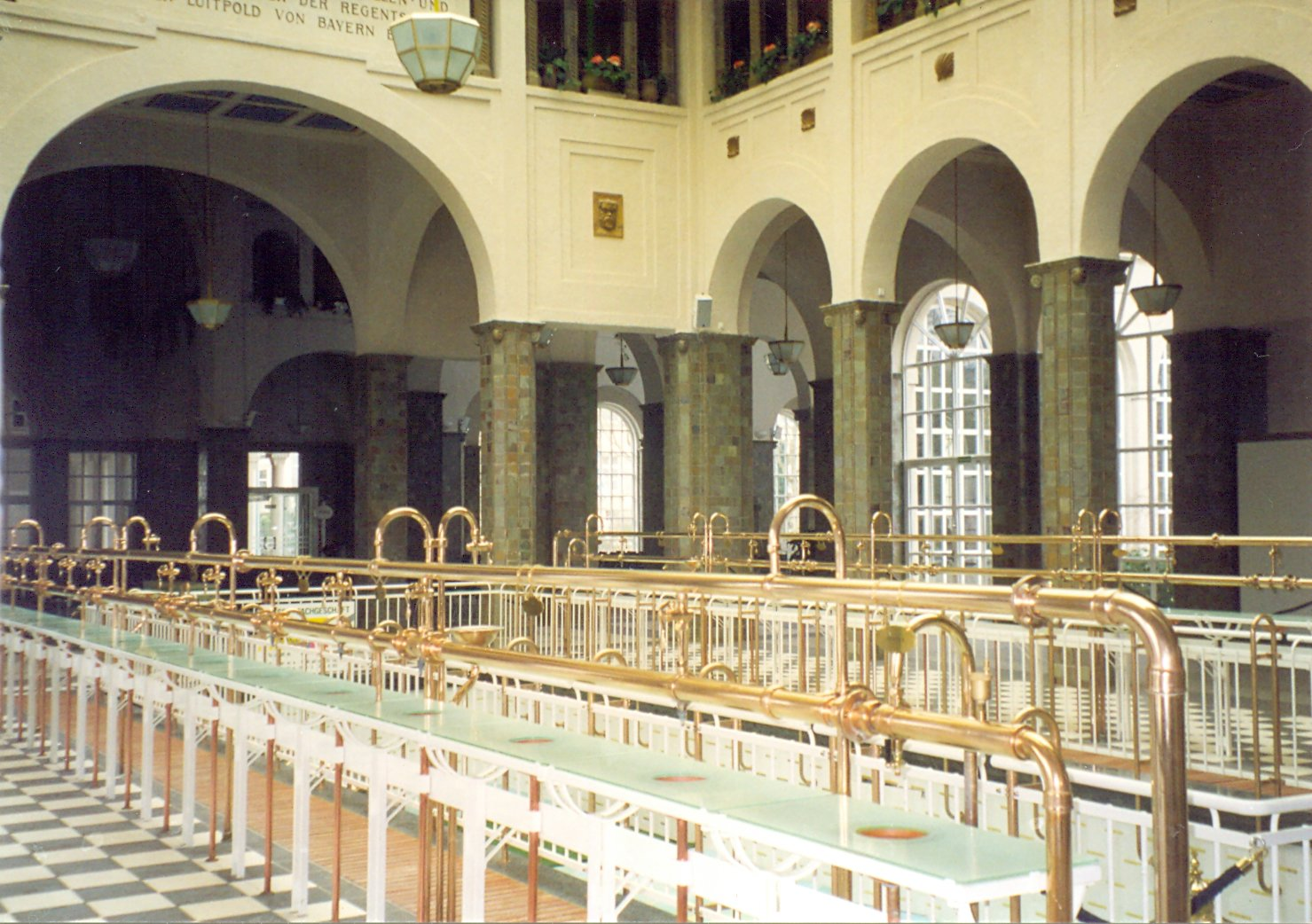
The Wandelhalle in Bad Kissingen

== Literature ==
- Angelika Baeumerth: Königsschloß contra Festtempel. Zur Architektur des Kursaalgebäudes von Bad Homburg vor der Höhe. Jonas-Verlag, Marburg 1990, ISBN 3-89445-104-1 (Mitteilungen des Vereins für Geschichte und Landeskunde zu Bad Homburg vor der Höhe 38), (also: Marburg (Lahn), Univ., Diss., 1990).
- Rolf Bothe (Hrsg.): Kurstädte in Deutschland. Zur Geschichte einer Baugattung. Frölich & Kaufmann, Berlin, 1984, ISBN 3-88725-002-8.
- Matthias Bitz: Badewesen in Südwestdeutschland. 1550 bis 1840. Zum Wandel von Gesellschaft und Architektur. Schulz-Kirchner, Idstein, 1989, ISBN (Wissenschaftliche Schriften im Wissenschaftlichen Verlag Dr. Schulz-Kirchner. Reihe 9: Geschichtswissenschaftliche Beiträge 108), (also: Mainz, Univ., Diss., 1988).
- Ulrich Coenen: Baden in Baden-Baden. Von den römischen Anlagen zur modernen Caracallatherme. In: Die Ortenau. Veröffentlichungen des Historischen Vereins für Mittelbaden. 81, 2001, ISSN 0342-1503, pp. 189–228.
- Ulrich Coenen: Von Aquae bis Baden-Baden. Die Baugeschichte der Stadt und ihr Beitrag zur Entwicklung der Kurarchitektur. Mainz-Verlag, Aachen 2008, ISBN 978-3-8107-0023-0.
- Ulrich Coenen: Die Kurstadt als Weltkulturerbe. In: Badische Heimat. 3, 2010, pp. 609–618.
- Ulrich Coenen: Kurarchitektur in Deutschland. In: Badische Heimat. 3, 2010, pp. 619–637.
- Thomas Föhl: Wildbad. Die Chronik einer Kurstadt als Baugeschichte. Druckhaus Müller, Neuenbürg, 1988.
- Carmen Putschky: Wilhelmsbad, Hofgeismar und Nenndorf. Drei Kurorte Wilhelms I. von Hessen-Kassel. Hannover 2000 (Marburg, Univ., Diss., 2000).
- Ulrich Rosseaux: Urbanität – Therapie – Unterhaltung. Zur historischen Bedeutung der Kur- und Bäderstädte des 19. Jahrhunderts. In: Stadt Baden-Baden (Hrsg.): Baden-Baden. Bäder- und Kurstadt des 19. Jahrhunderts. Bewerbung der Stadt Baden-Baden als UNESCO-Weltkulturerbe. Ergebnisse des Workshops im Palais Biron am 22. November 2008. Stadtverwaltung Baden-Baden, Baden-Baden, 2009, pp. 49–51.
- Petra Simon, Margrit Behrens: Badekur und Kurbad. Bauten in deutschen Bädern 1780–1920. Diederichs, Munich, 1988, ISBN 3-424-00958-X.
- Monika Steinhauser: Das europäische Modebad des 19. Jahrhunderts. Baden-Baden, eine Residenz des Glücks. In: Ludwig Grote (ed.): Die deutsche Stadt im 19. Jahrhundert. Stadtplanung und Baugestaltung im industriellen Zeitalter. Prestel, Munich, 1974, ISBN 3-7913-0051-2, pp. 95–128 (Studien zur Kunst des neunzehnten Jahrhunderts 24).
- Anke Ziegler: Deutsche Kurstädte im Wandel. Von den Anfängen bis zum Idealtypus im 19. Jahrhundert. Lang, Frankfurt am Main u. a. 2004, ISBN 3-631-52543-5 (Europäische Hochschulschriften. Reihe 37: Architektur 26), (also: Kaiserslautern, Univ., Diss., 2003).
