= Friedrichsbad =

Baden-Baden bath

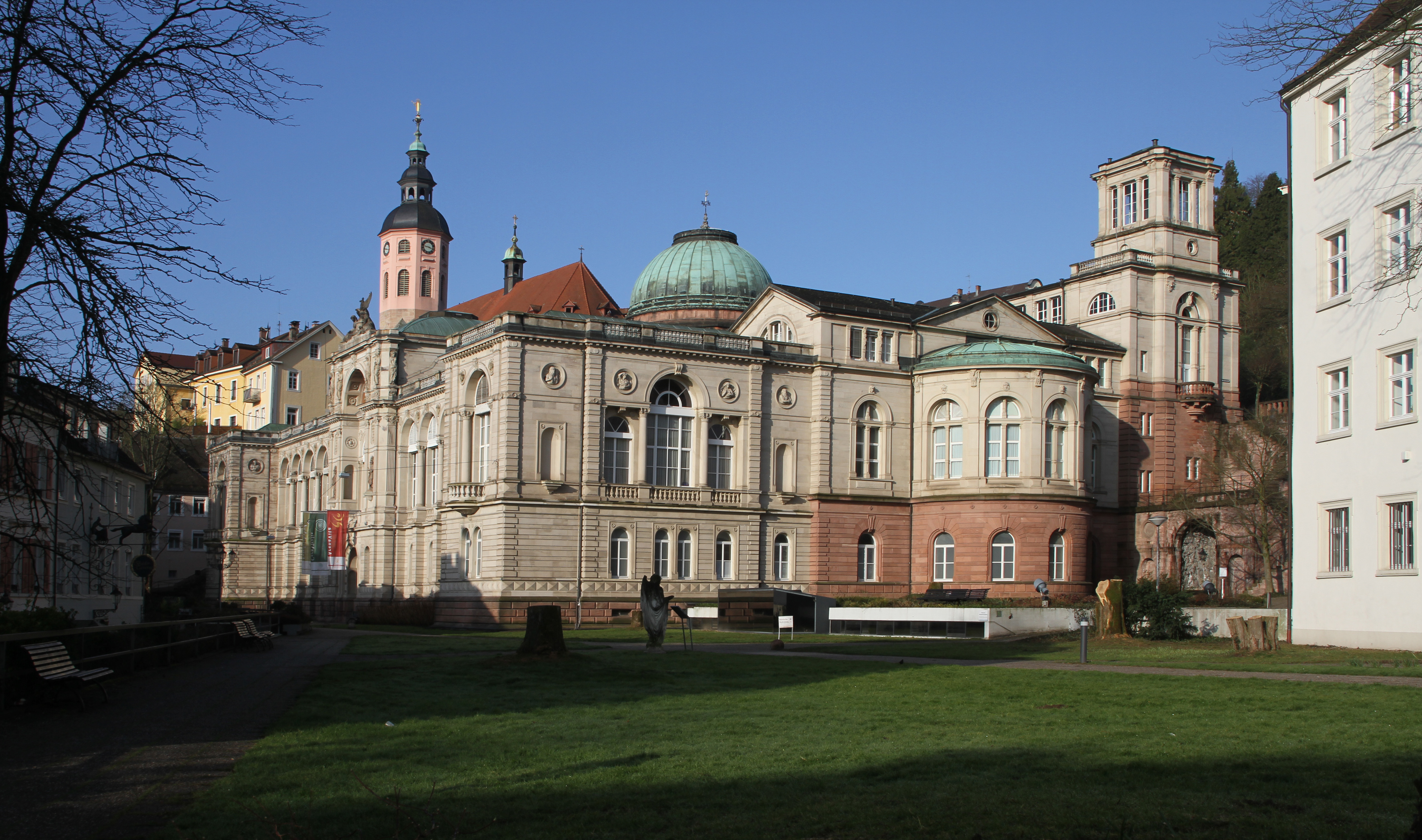
- Interactive map of Friedrichsbad
- 48.7631°N 8.2422°E
- Location: Baden-Baden, Baden-Württemberg, Germany

History
- Built: 1877

Site notes
- Architect: Karl Dernfeld
- Architectural style: Neo-renaissance
- Owner: Carasana Bäderbetriebe GmbH

The Friedrichsbad is a spa in the city of Baden-Baden in Germany. The Neo-renaissance spa building was completed in 1877.

== History and architecture ==
The architect Karl Dernfeld designed the Friedrichsbad in the Renaissance style. It was built between 1869 and 1877.

The lush Renaissance-style facade of the Friedrichsbad is adorned with two panels bearing the following inscription from Goethe’s Faust in gold letters:

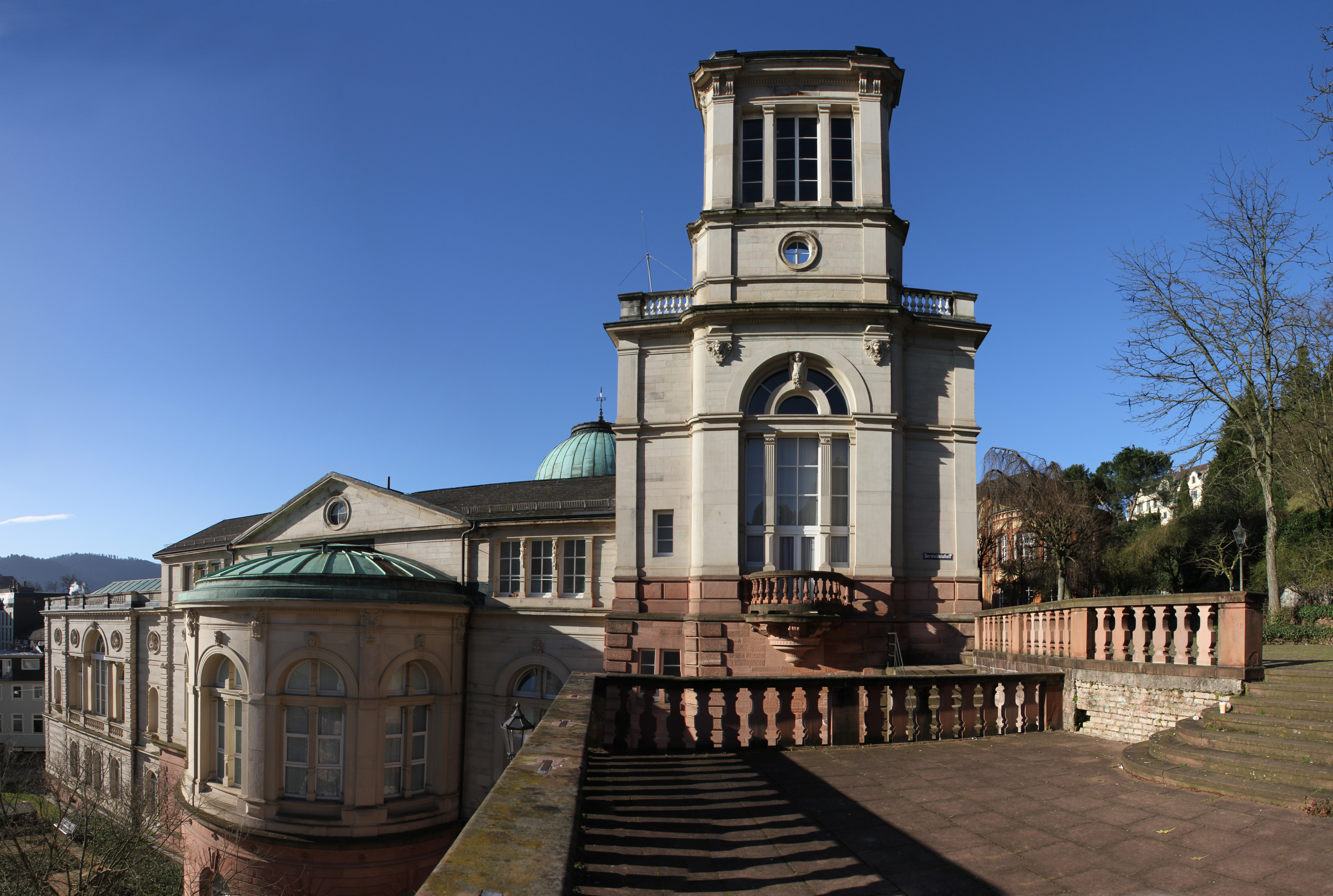
North-eastern side of the Friedrichsbad

„Wunderwirkend strömt die Welle,

Strömt der heisse Dampf der Quelle,

Muth wird freier, Blut wird neuer,

heil dem Wasser, heil dem Feuer!“

[Working wonders the wave is streaming

Streaming the hot steam of the spring

Feelings become freer, blood newer

Hail water! Hail fire!]

In 1867, the North German Confederation decided to ban gambling in all of Germany from 1872 onwards. During the public discussions about casinos that had been going on for a number of years, the city of Baden-Baden was looking for alternatives in order to remain attractive to spa guests. Karl Dernfeld, who was relatively unknown at the time, became Baden-Baden's district building inspector in 1868. Together with the grand ducal spa doctor and Medical Councilor Dr. Carl Frech, he was commissioned to visit well-known health baths in order to implement the knowledge gained for the construction of the Friedrichsbad.

Direct architectural models for the Friedrichsbad are the Raitzenbad in Budapest and the Graf-Eberhardsbad (today Palais Thermal) in Wildbad, which Dernfeld visited during his trip with Dr. Frech to get to know the most important health resorts in Germany and Austria-Hungary. The Eberhardsbad in Wildbad was built between 1840 and 1847, the Raitzenbad in Budapest from 1866 to 1873. As far as old writings can be read, Dernfeld is also said to be inspired by the Baths of Caracalla and the Baths of Diocletian in Rome. The extensive excavations were started in 1869. Remnants of Roman baths were found. The opening of the Grand Ducal Friedrichsbad took place on December 15, 1877.

Dernfeld's original architectural plans are lost. Changed therapeutic considerations have led to multiple spatial changes during 125 years of operation of the spa. For example, "apparatus for mechanical therapeutic gymnastics" were installed in the Friedrichsbad in Baden-Baden as early as 1884. This might have been one of the first therapeutically supervised facility that resembles modern fitness studios. At that time, not only active devices that had to be worked on were set up, but also passive devices that moved different body parts with machine power.

== The spa ==
The thermal water has its source on the slopes of the Florentinerberg in Baden-Baden. Around 50% of the thermal spring water flows through the Friedrichstollen which is the main catchment tunnel. From depths of between 1200 and 1800 metres, the water reaches the surface at temperatures ranging from 56 °C to 68.8 °C from a total of twelve separate sodium chloride-bearing artesian springs. The springs are approximately 12,000 to 17,000 years old and discharge around 800,000 litres of thermal water a day (that's 9 litres a second) with a daily mineral content of 2,400 kg.

As of 2020, the Friedrichsbad belongs to the Carasana Bäderbetriebe GmbH and claims to combine the Roman bathing culture with Irish hot air baths. The Friedrichsbad is now home to massage rooms as well as private suites and exhibition space that shows the Roman bath ruins of the Friedrichsbad.

== Trivia ==
Mark Twain (1835–1910) is said to have commented the Friedrichsbad spa as follows: "After 10 minutes you forget time, after 20 minutes you forget the world.”

== See also ==
- List of Spa towns in Germany
- Spa architecture
- Kurhaus of Baden-Baden
- Palais Thermal

== Photo gallery ==
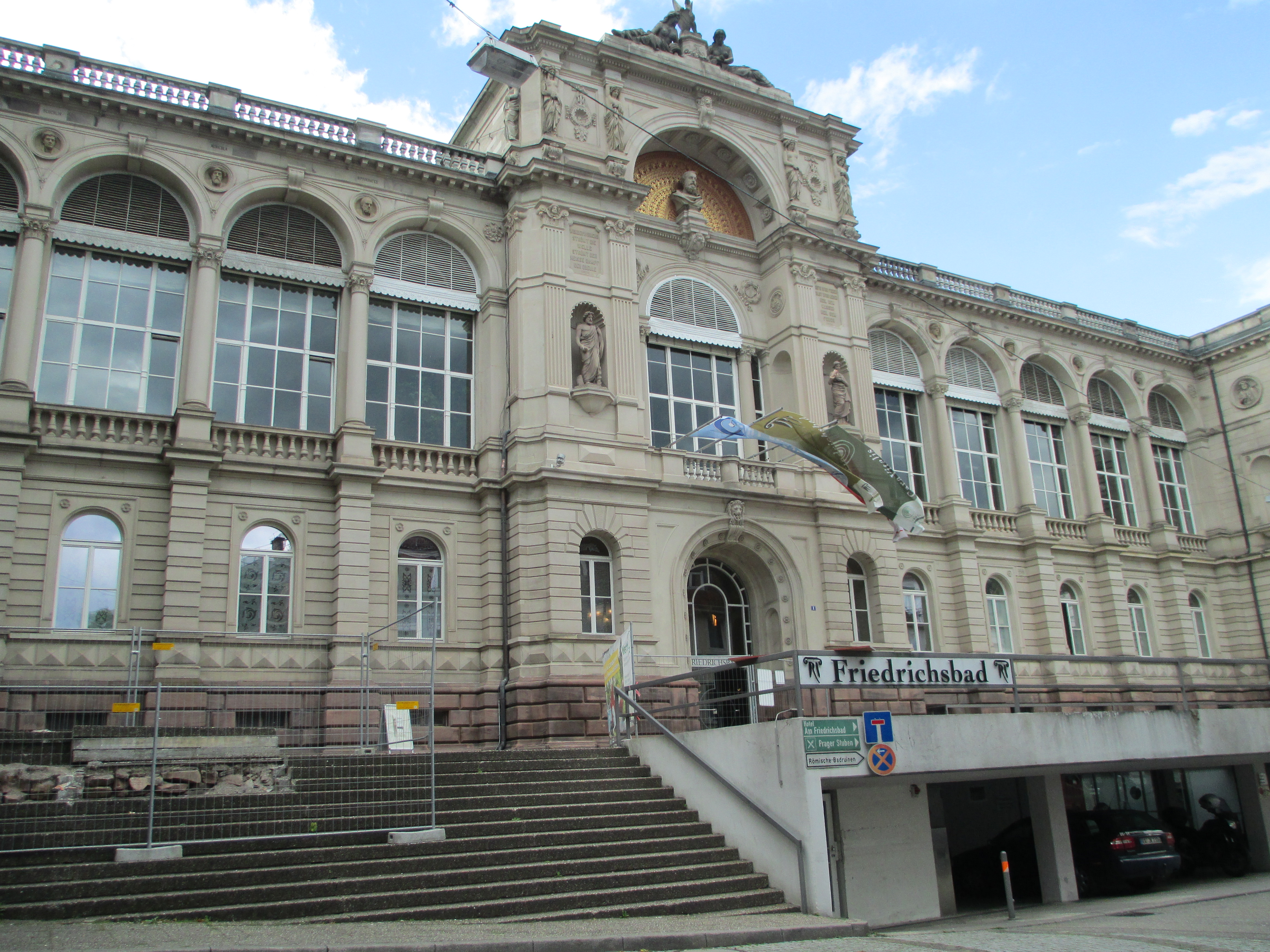
Front view of the Friedrichsbad

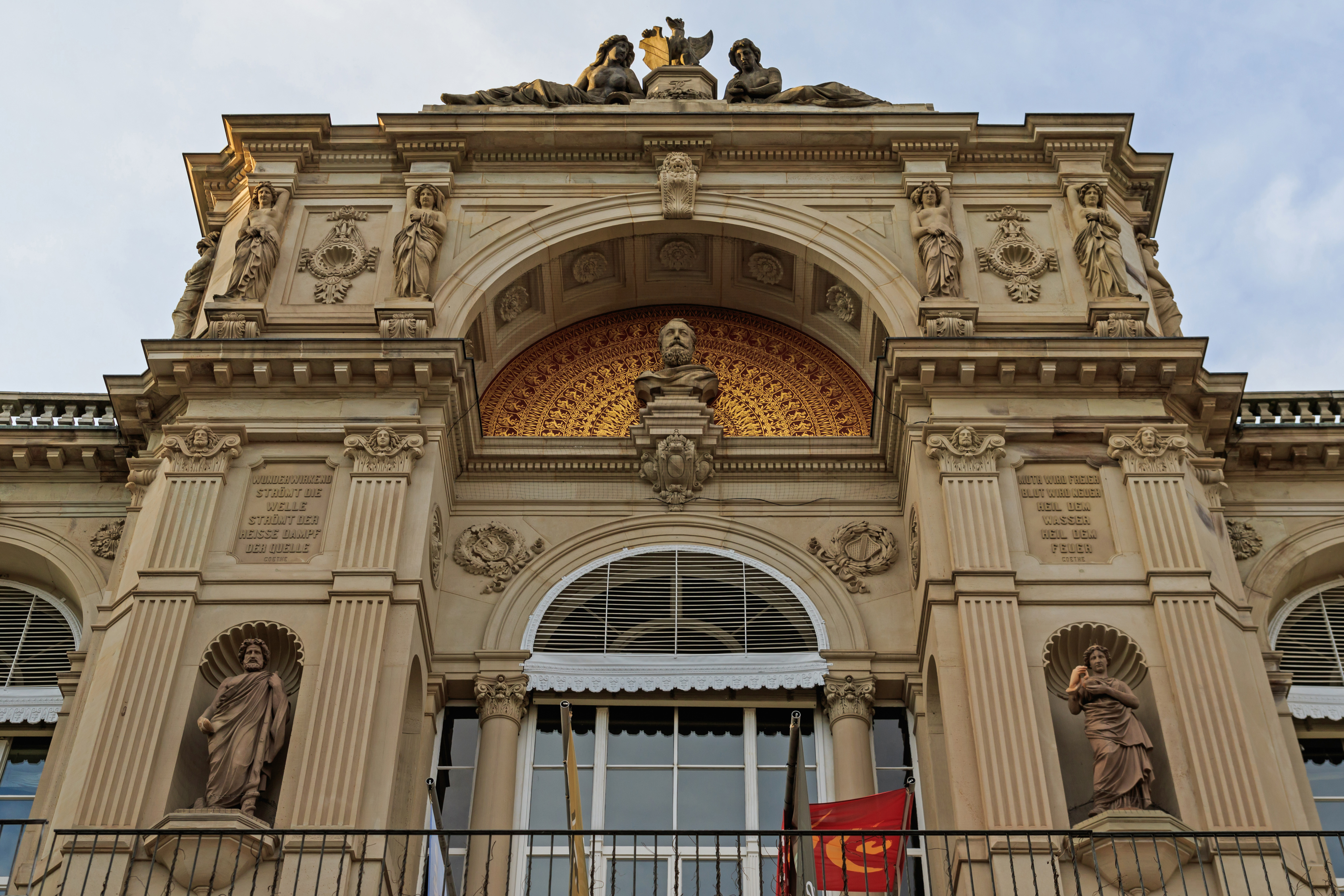
Front view

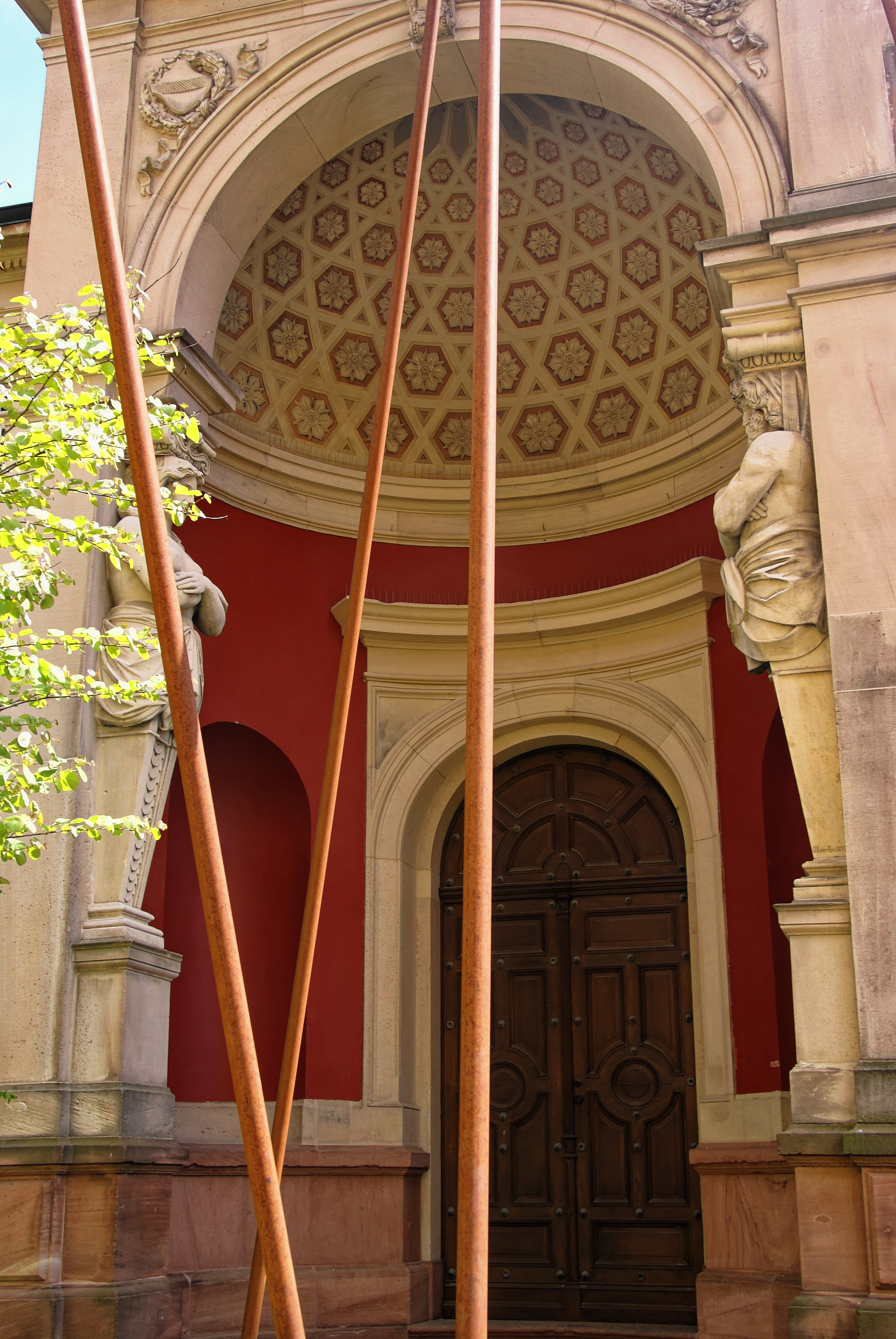
Cupola in the renaissance style

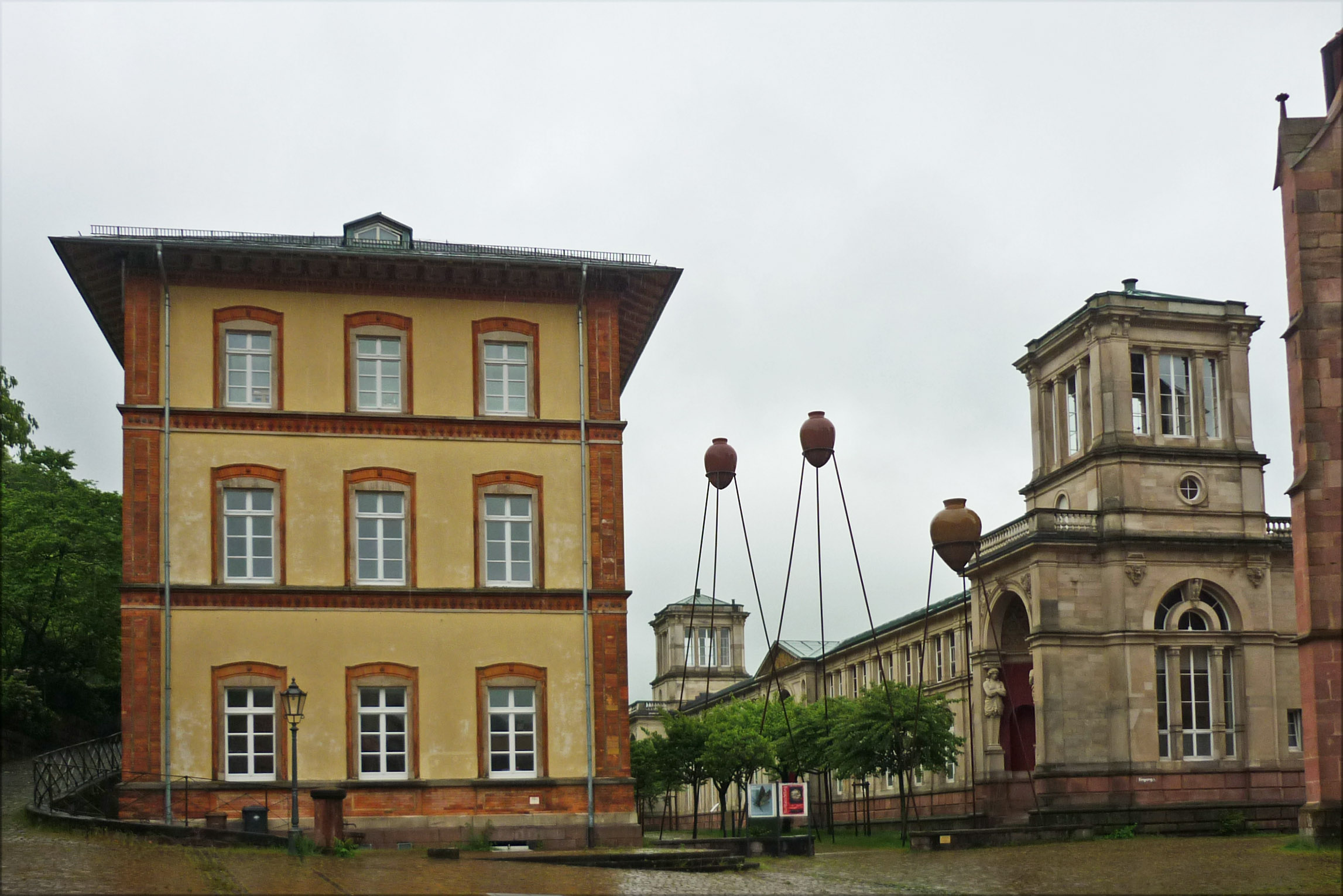
Old Steam Bath Building

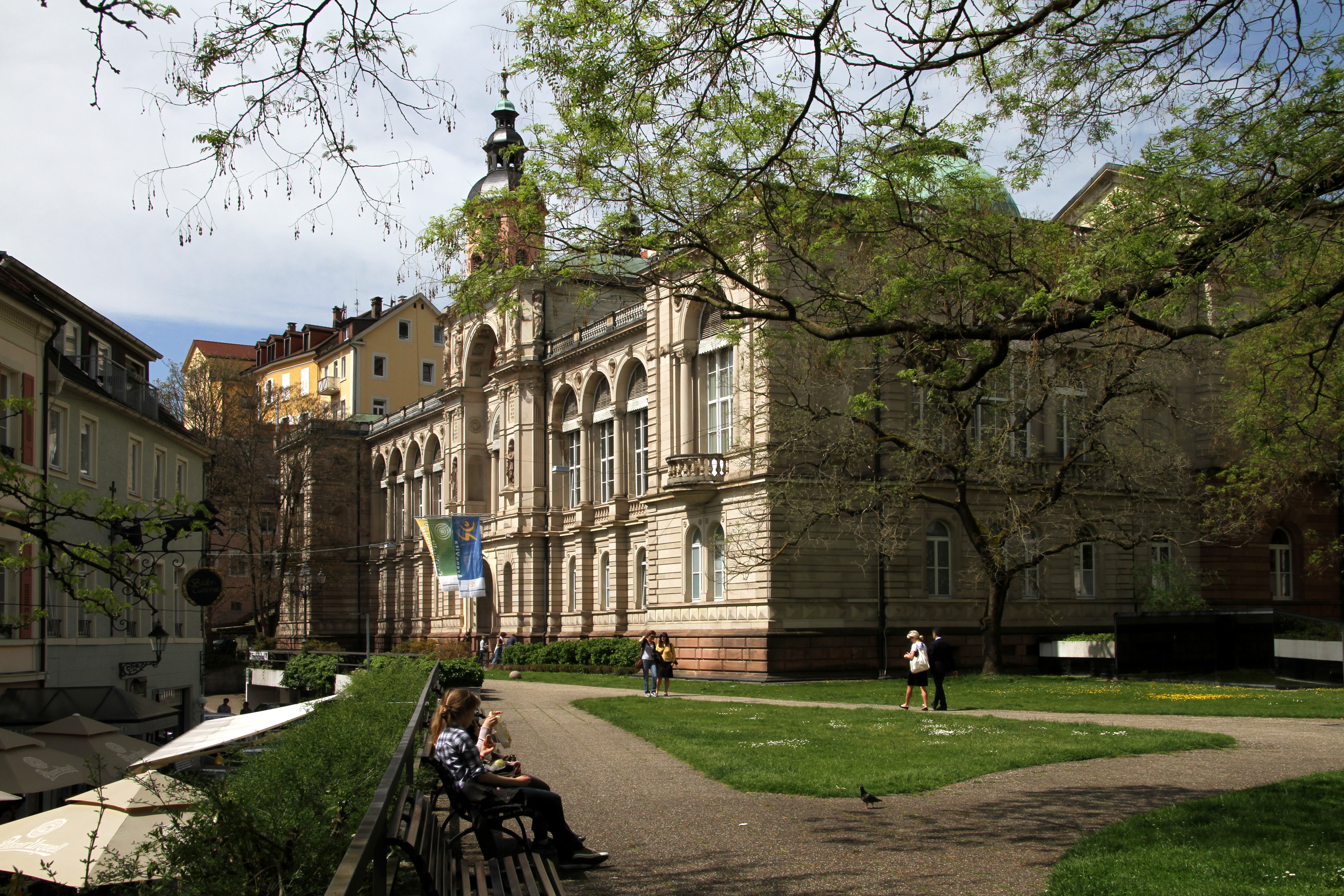
The Friedrichsbad in the spring time

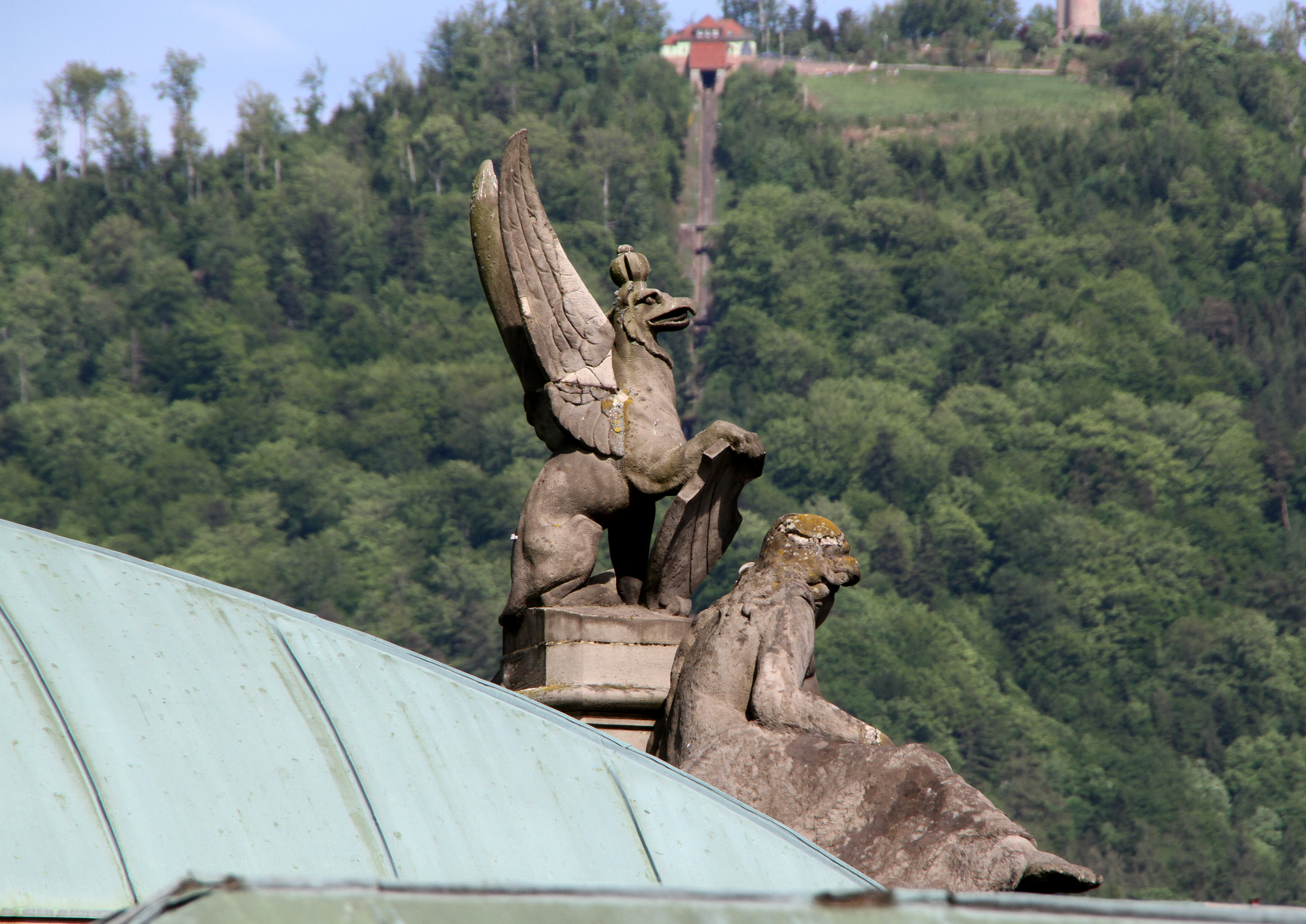
Gable figure on the roof of the Friedrichsbad

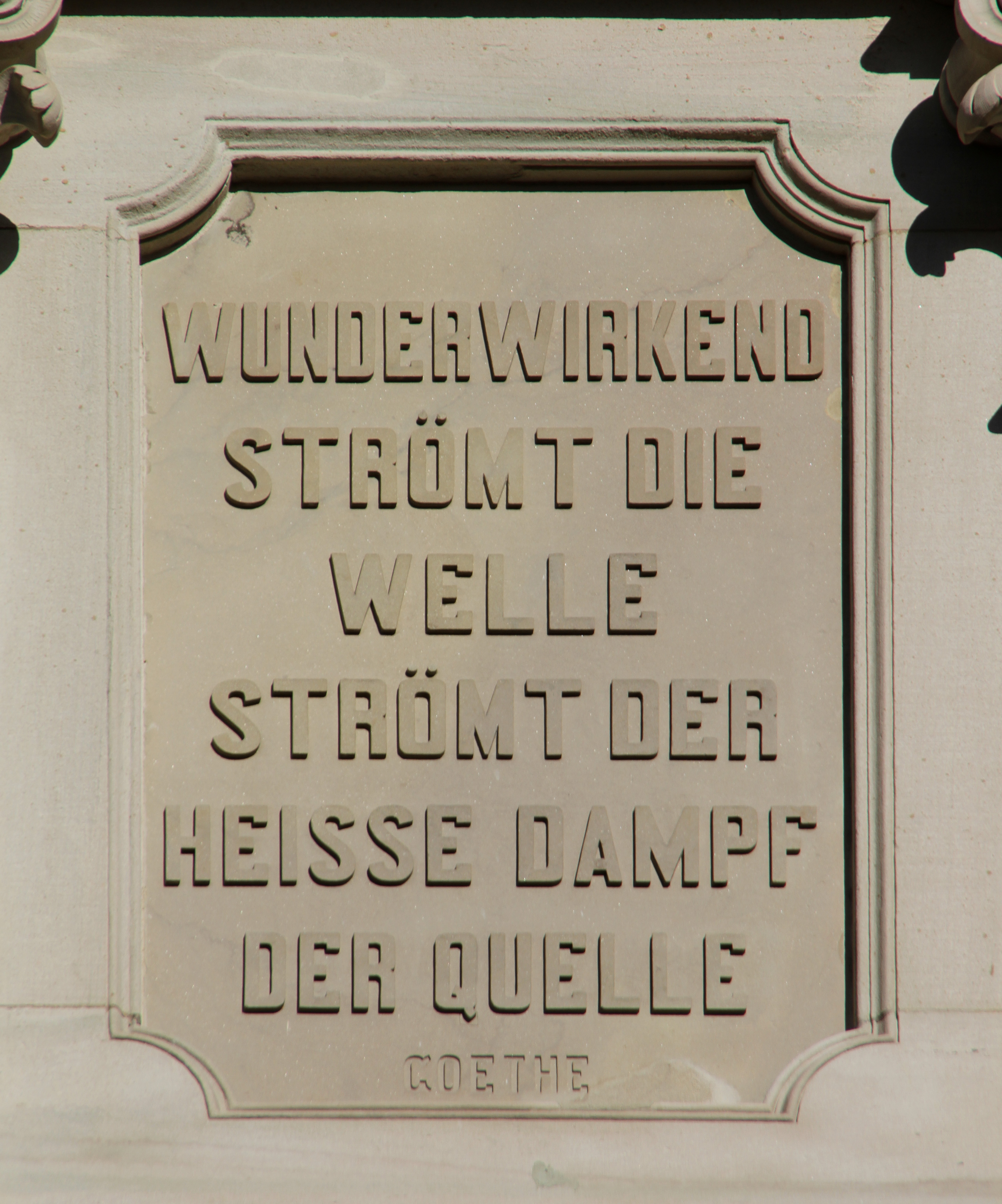
Goethe quote part I

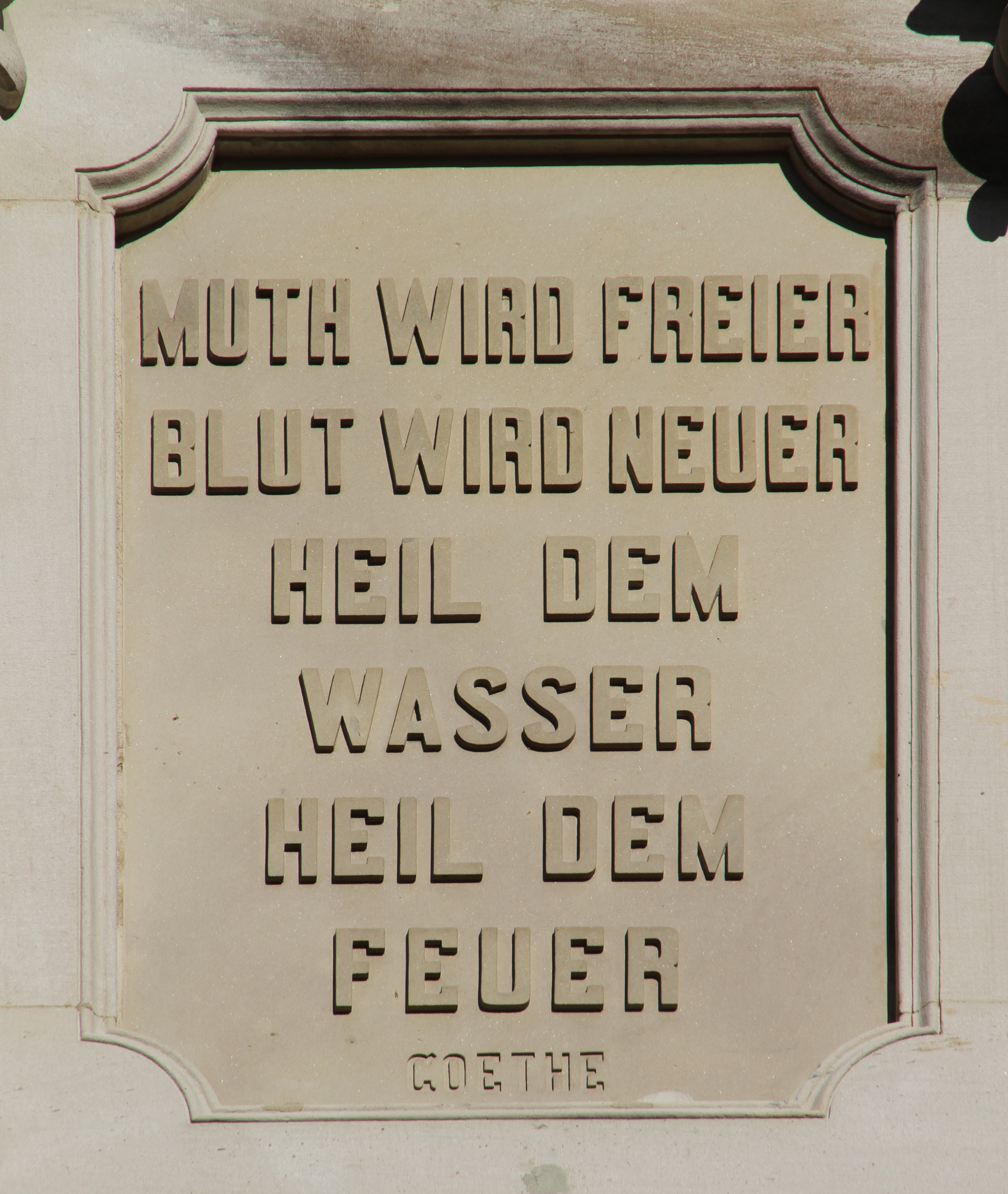
Goethe quote part II
