= Palais Thermal =

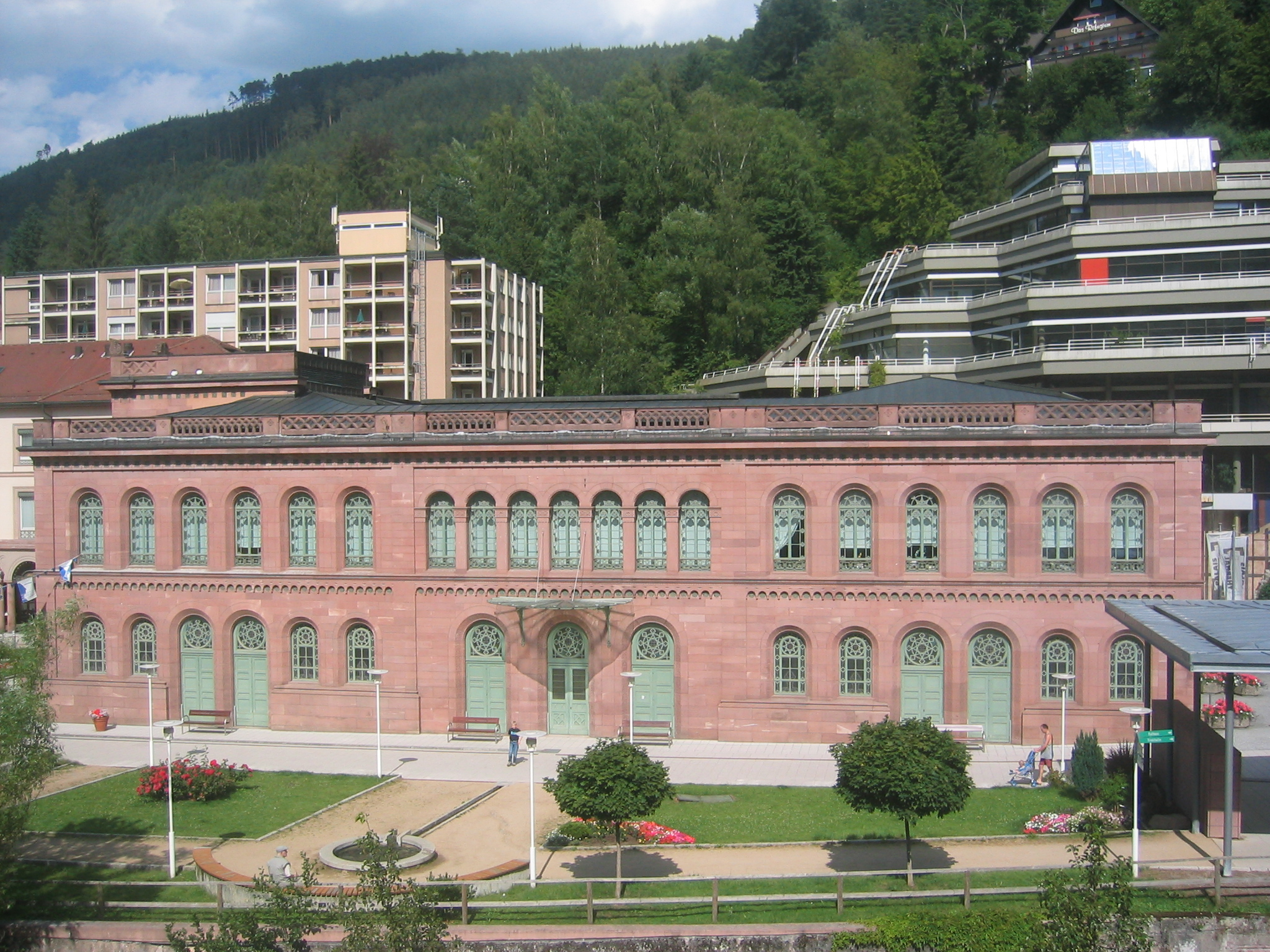
- Interactive map of Palais Thermal
- 48.7497°N 8.5507°E
- Location: Bad Wildbad, Baden-Württemberg, Germany

History
- Built: 1847

Site notes
- Architect: Nikolaus Friedrich von Thouret
- Architectural style: Classicism

The Palais Thermal is a spa in Bad Wildbad in Germany. The construction for the spa building was finished in 1847 and opened under the name of Graf-Eberhard-Bad.

== Architecture ==
The "Wildbad" established not only the centuries-old bathing tradition in the Oberes Enztal which have been documented in Bad Wildbad since 1521, but also determined the location of the Graf-Eberhard-Bad in the last century. The well-known thermal springs have been used for bathing and curing since the Middle Ages. The original buildings were redesigned over many centuries to meet the social and cultural changes of the respective centuries.

From the beginning of the 19th century, the desire for spa and bathing resorts arose in all of Central Europe due to the increasing economic potential, increasing mobility and the use of advertising. Nikolaus Friedrich von Thouret is the architect of the building as it is known today. The Graf-Eberhard-Bad und Badhotel was created as an ensemble between 1840 and 1847. The two-storey, compact building on the outside, despite the manifold connections, impresses with its clear symmetry and strict order on the inside.

Since 1847, it was rebuilt several times and adapted to the prevailing taste. At the end of the 19th century, the Prince Baths, the central hall and the corridor zones were "orientalised". In the course of a further major renovation in 1896, the window panes on the ground floor with older decorations were replaced or supplemented by Art Nouveau ornamental glazing.

After five years of extensive renovations and conversions, the Graf-Eberhard-Bad was reopened in December 1995 as "Palais Thermal".

== Photo gallery ==
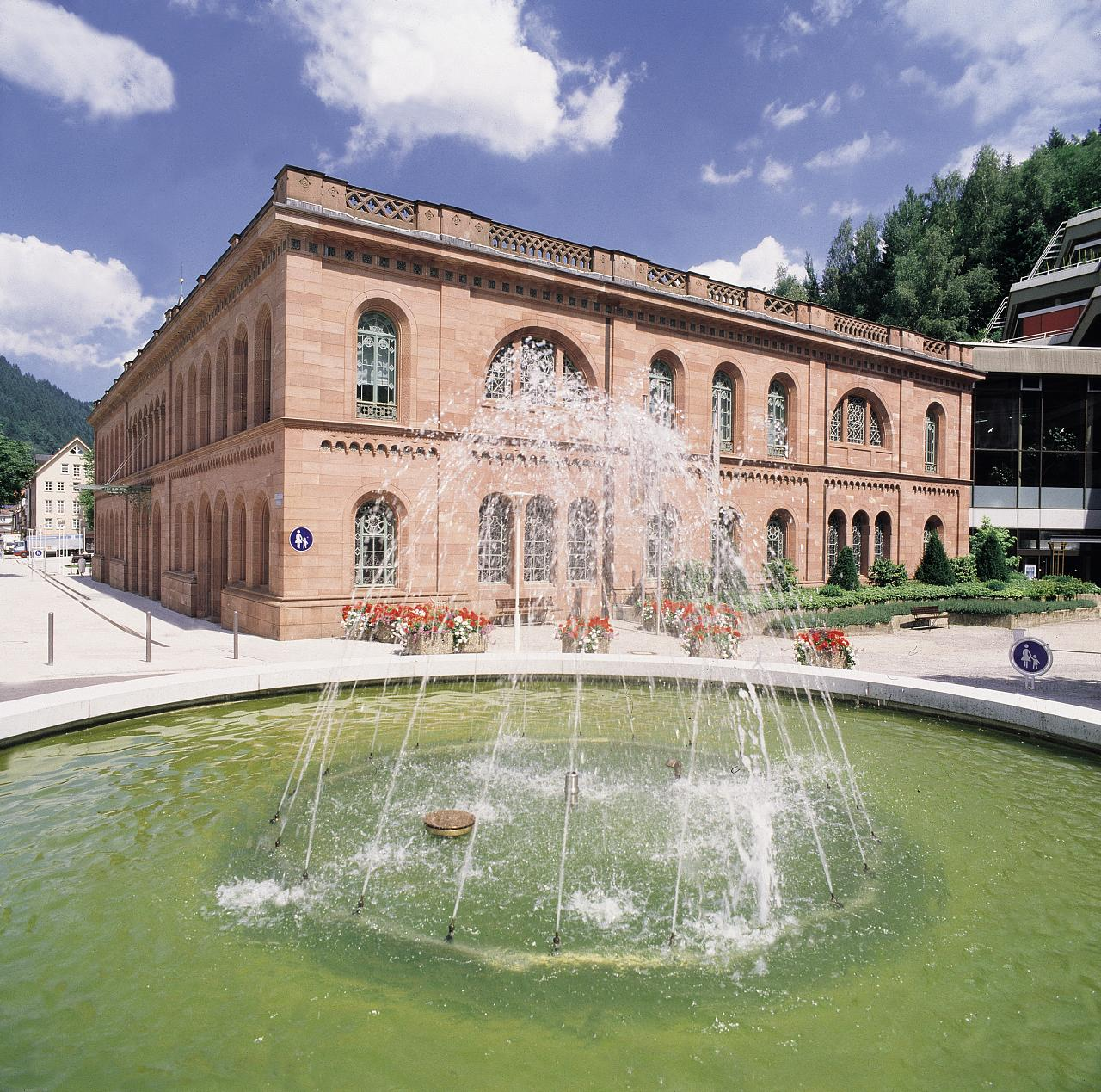
Palais Thermal from the outside

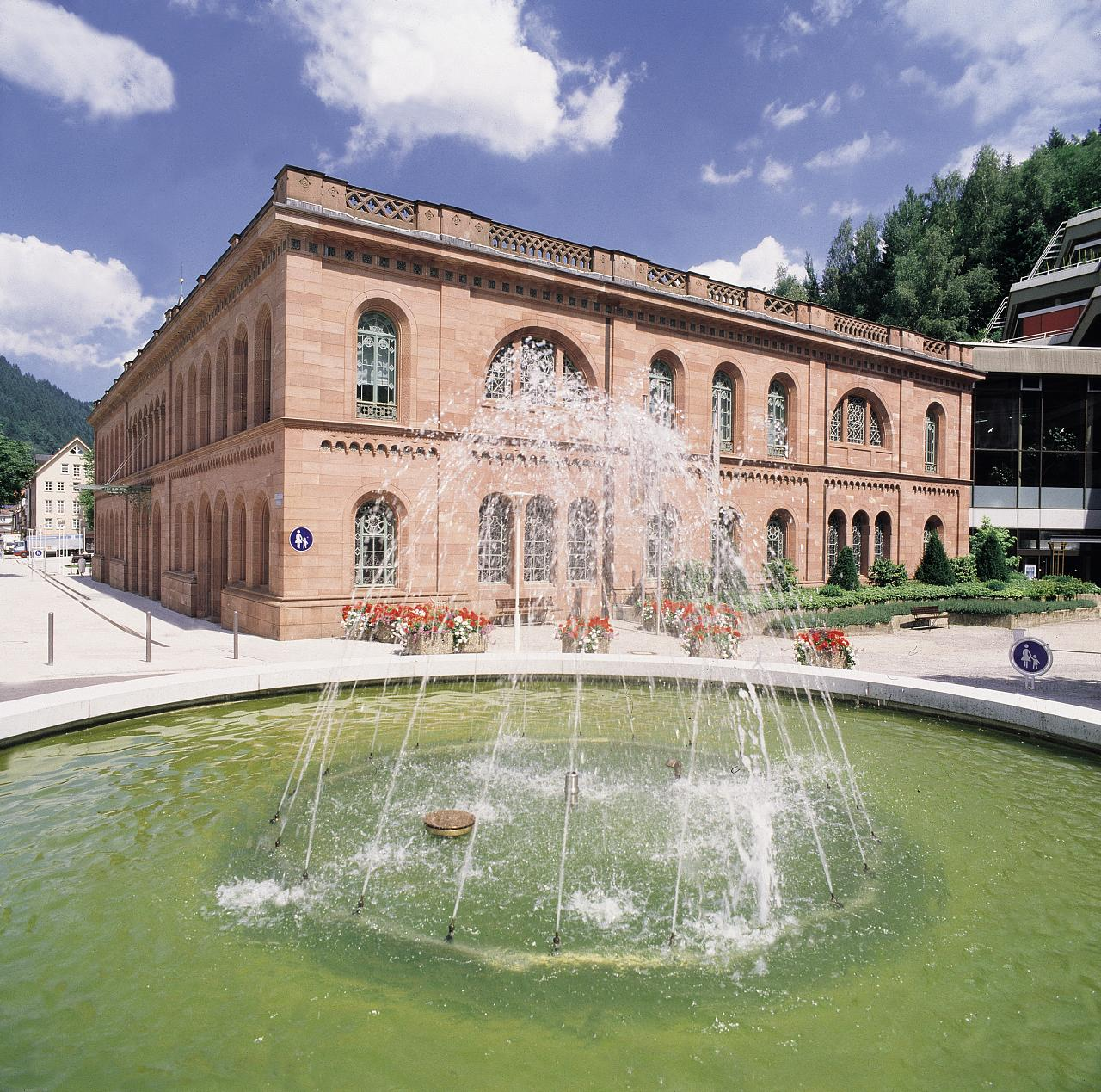
Fountain in front of the Palais Thermal

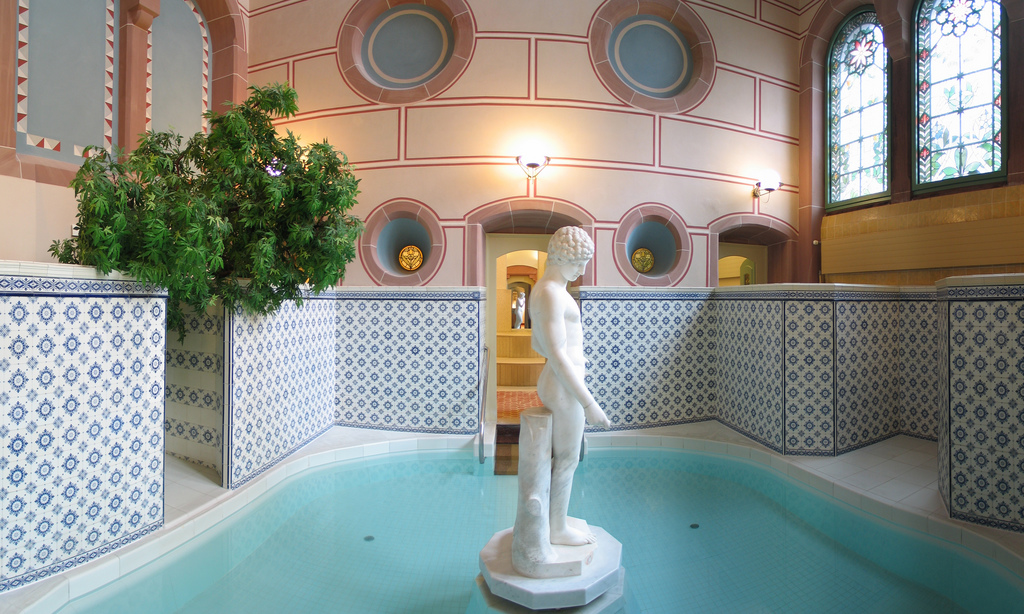
Oriental ornaments inside the Palais Thermal

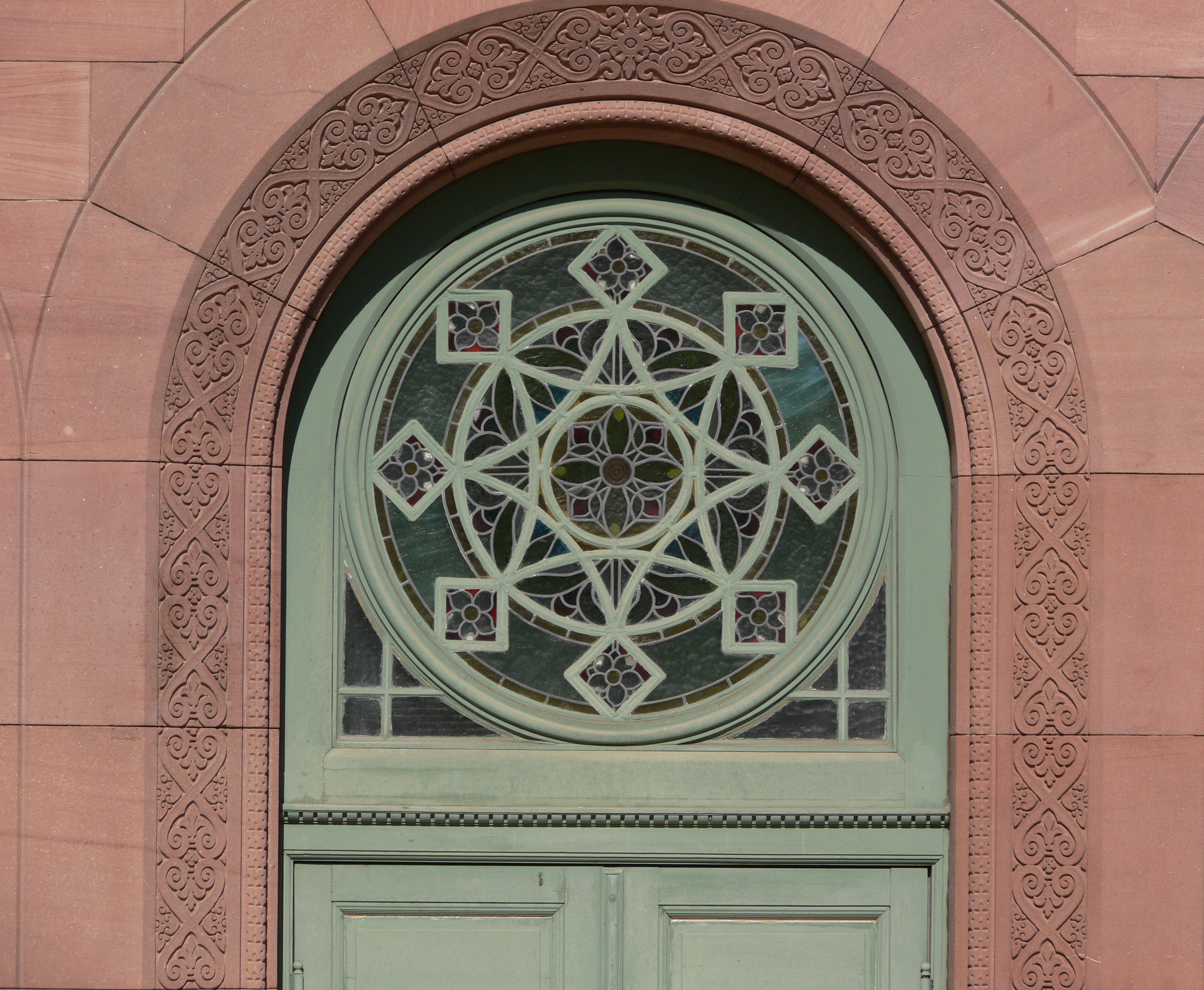
Arabesque as window detail

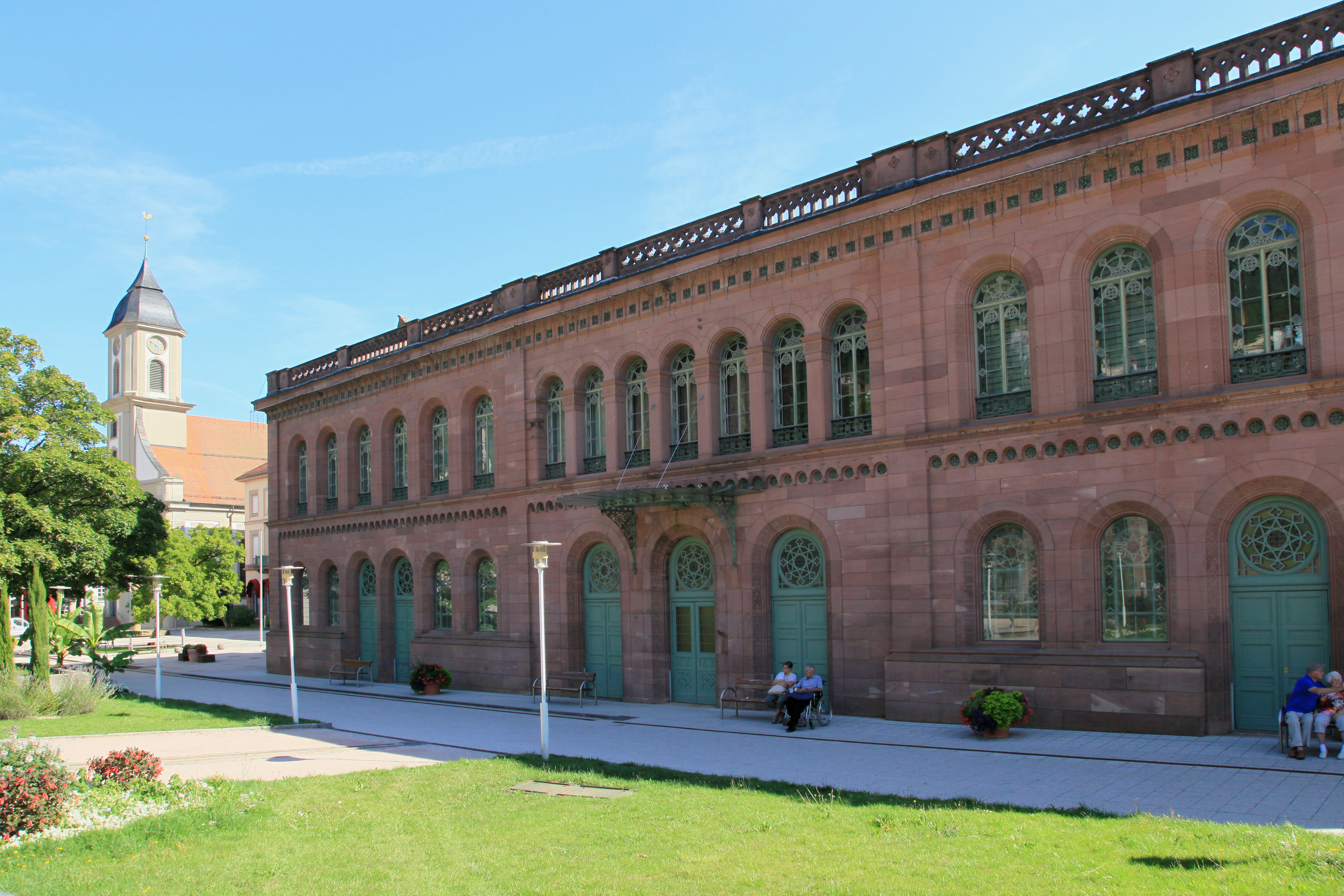

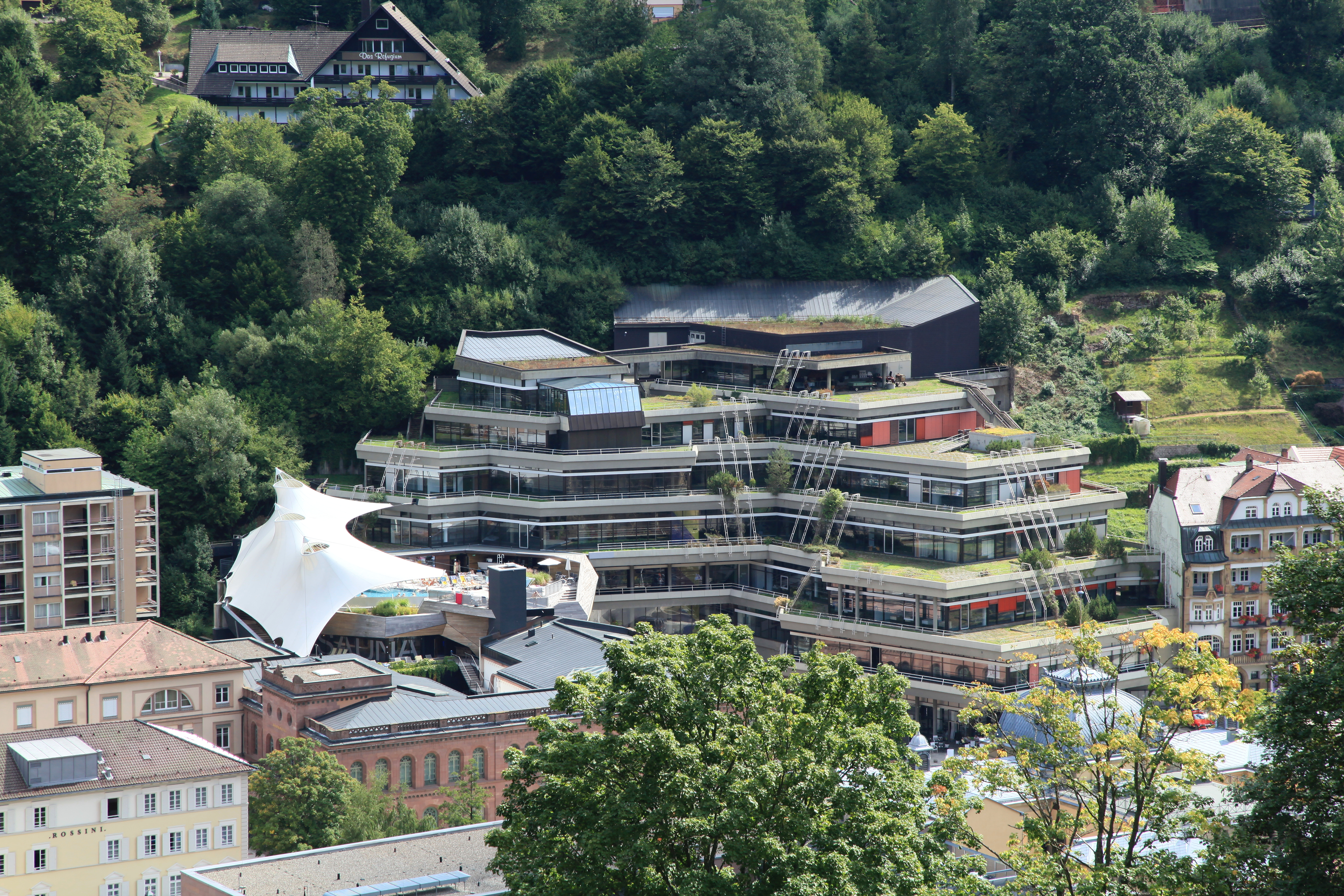
Moderner Anbau

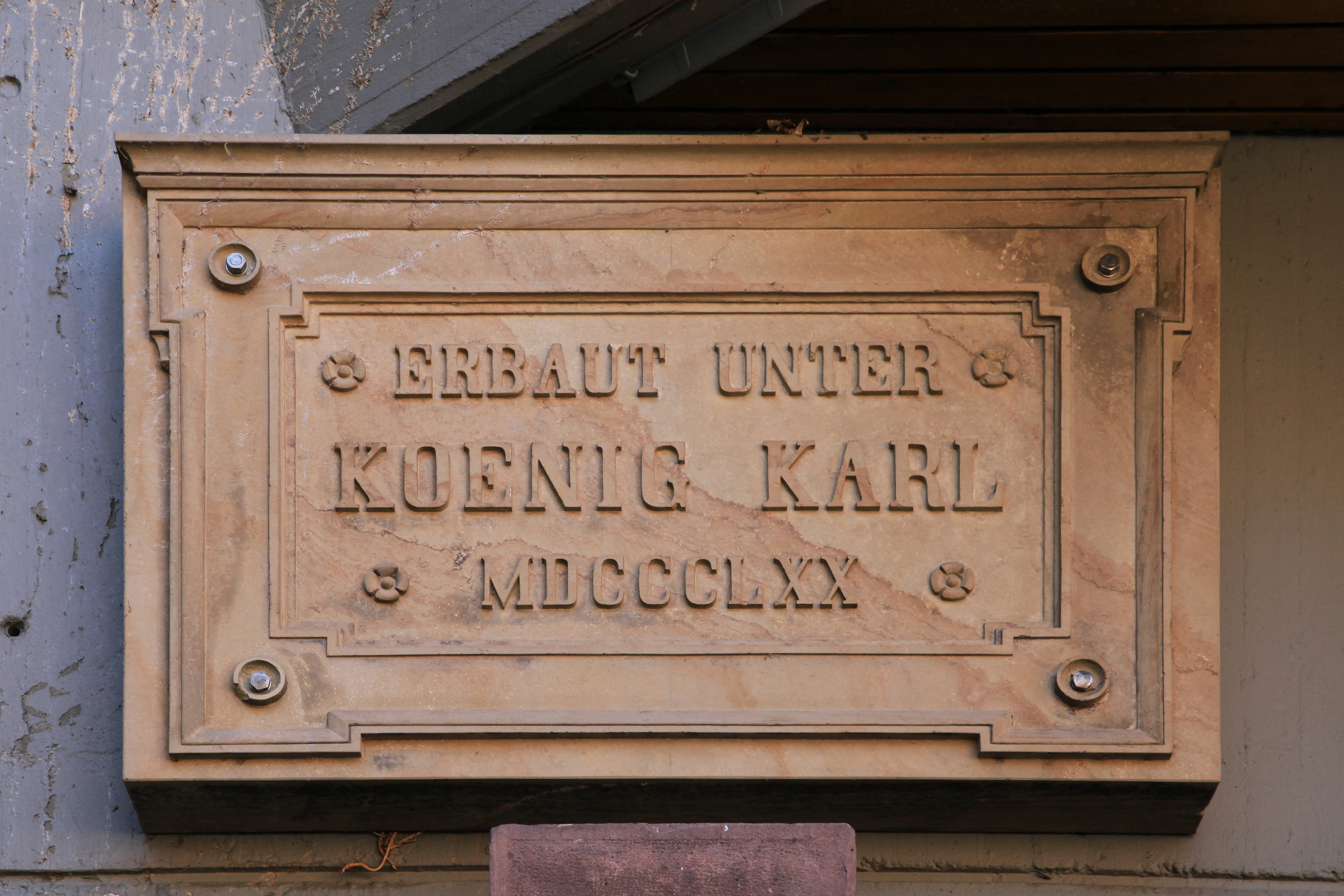
"Built under rule of Charles I of Württemberg in 1870"

== See also ==
- List of spa towns in Germany
- Spa architecture
- Friedrichsbad
