= Nikolaus Friedrich von Thouret =

German architect and painter (1767–1845)

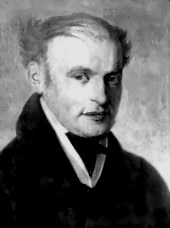
- Born: 2 June 1767; Ludwigsburg, Baden-Württemberg, Germany
- Died: 17 January 1845 (aged 77); Stuttgart, Baden-Württemberg, Germany
- Occupation: Architect

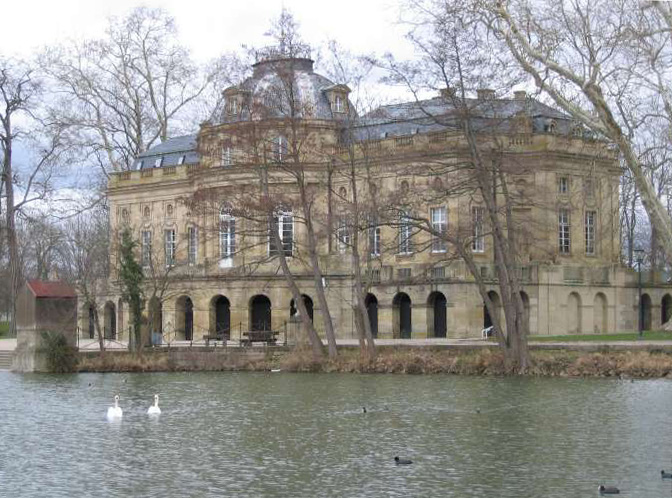
The Schloss Monrepos

Nikolaus Friedrich von Thouret (born Ludwigsburg, 2 June 1767; died Stuttgart, 17 January 1845) was a German architect and designer.

== Life and work ==
From 1778 to 1788 he was educated at the Hohe Karlsschule in Stuttgart where he trained as a painter. He then attended the Académie des Beaux-Arts (1789–1790) in Paris and studied architecture in Rome (1791–1797). After returning to Stuttgart, he worked for the court in Württemberg as a designer-draughtsman and decorative painter.

An early architectural project was the Gothic Revival church of Hohenheim (1797; re-erected 1803 at Monrepos, Ludwigsburg; ruin since the 1940s. With the assistance of Goethe, whom he met in Stuttgart in 1797, Thouret was commissioned to design the décor of the Schloss in Weimar and to renovate the court theatre there (1798–1800). On his return to Stuttgart, Thouret was appointed court architect to Frederick II, Duke of Württemberg (1754–1816), in 1799. He undertook numerous building projects, nearly all in the Neo-classical style, in Stuttgart and Ludwigsburg where the dukes had their official residences; these schemes took account of the increasing need for prestigious buildings in Württemberg, following its elevation in 1806 to the Status of a kingdom, with the Duke becoming its first king. As well as renovations to the royal palaces, designs for park furniture and ephemeral festival constructions, several theatre projects were entrusted to Thouret, and he also produced furniture designs for the interior decoration of the palaces. In addition to his work for the Court, Thouret designed many private buildings, especially in Stuttgart (e.g., Wohnhaus Erbe, Königstrasse, 1806; Wohnhaus Kohl, Friedrichstrasse, 1817). After the death of the King in 1816, Thouret was dismissed in 1817 from his post as court architect.

In 1818, he designed the Fruit Column in Stuttgart. He was appointed Professor of architecture, but because of delays in the proposed establishment of a professional academy his potential as a teacher of architecture was never developed. Instead, he continued to be given design commissions and was involved in almost all the foremost architectural projects undertaken in Stuttgart to the 1830s (e.g., Katharinenhospital, 1827; Hoftheater, 1833). Among the few Works by Thouret that have been preserved are his schemes for the interior decoration of Weimar Palace (begun 1789) and Ludwigsburg Palace (begun 1805), interior rooms and King's library of Schloss Favorite (1809), the theatre (1812) at Ludwigsburg Palace, the assembly hall and pump room (begun 1825) in Bad Cannstatt and the Eberhard baths (begun 1838) in Wildbad.

In the 1840s before his death, he designed the main building of the Palais Thermal in Bad Wildbad.
