= Bad Wildbad =

Town in Germany

- Town
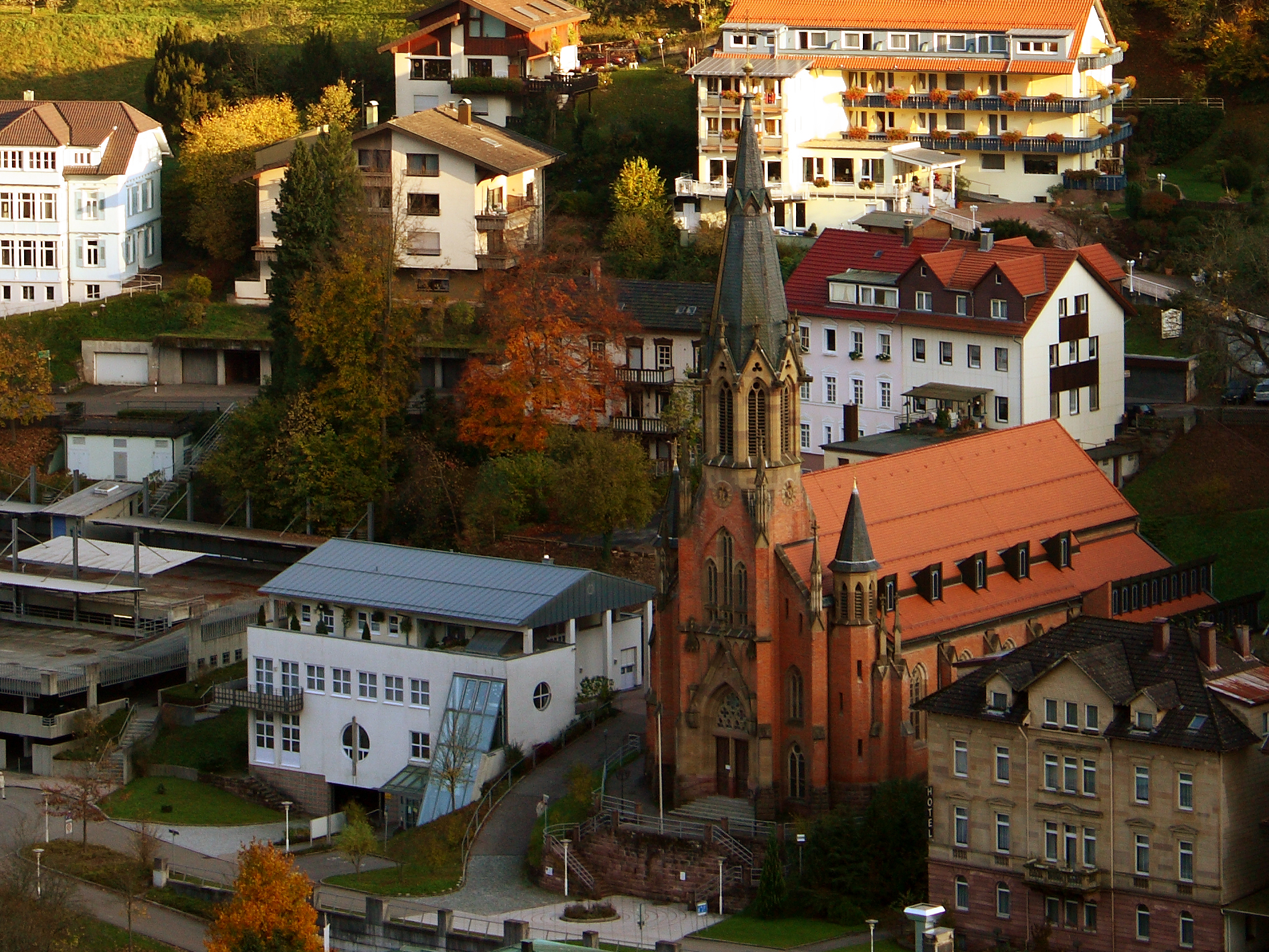

- Flag Coat of arms

- Location of Bad Wildbad within Calw district
- Interactive map of Bad Wildbad
- Location within Germany Location within Baden-Württemberg
- Coordinates: 48°45′1″N 8°33′1″E
- Country: Germany
- State: Baden-Württemberg
- Admin. region: Karlsruhe
- District: Calw
- Subdivisions: 6

Government
  - Mayor (2022–30): Marco Gauger

Area
  - Total: 105.22 km^{2} (40.63 sq mi)
- Elevation: 425 m (1,394 ft)

Population (2025-12-31)
  - Total: 10,359
  - Density: 98.451/km^{2} (254.99/sq mi)
- Time zone: UTC+01:00 (CET)
  - Summer (DST): UTC+02:00 (CEST)
- Postal codes: 75323
- Dialling codes: 07081
- Vehicle registration: CW
- Website: www.bad-wildbad.de

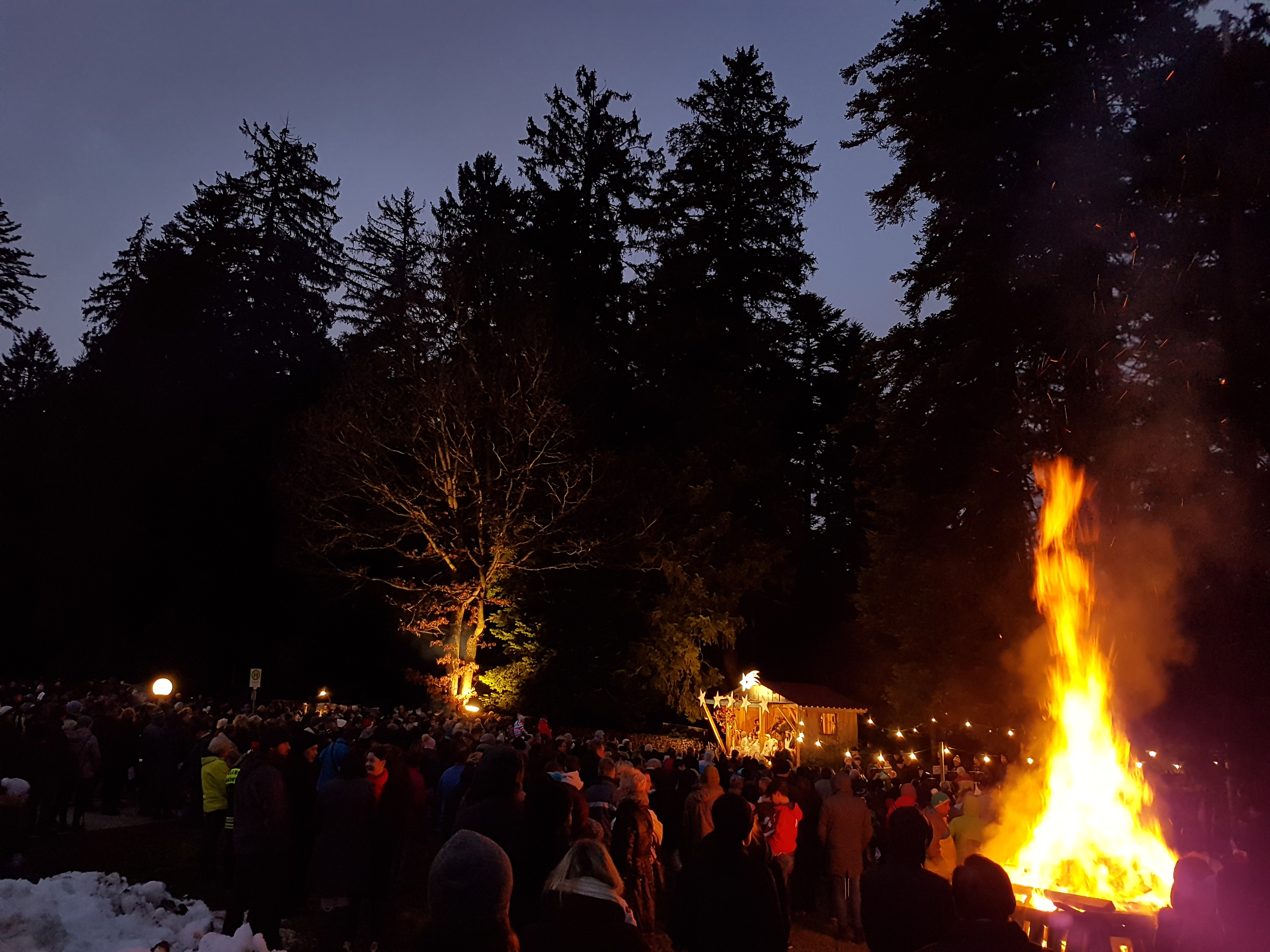
Christmas in Bad Wilbad-Aichelberg, 24.12.

Bad Wildbad (German pronunciation: [baːt ˈvɪltbaːt]) is a town in Germany, in the state of Baden-Württemberg. It is located in the government district (Regierungsbezirk) of Karlsruhe and in the district (Landkreis) of Calw. The current town of Bad Wildbad is an amalgamation of several communities brought together under local government reform in 1974. The member communities are Wildbad, Calmbach, Sprollenhaus, Nonnenmiß and Aichelberg, along with the hamlets of Hünerberg und Meistern. The town was named only Wildbad until 1991, when it was given its current name. "Bad" is German for "bath", a reference to the town's status as a spa town.

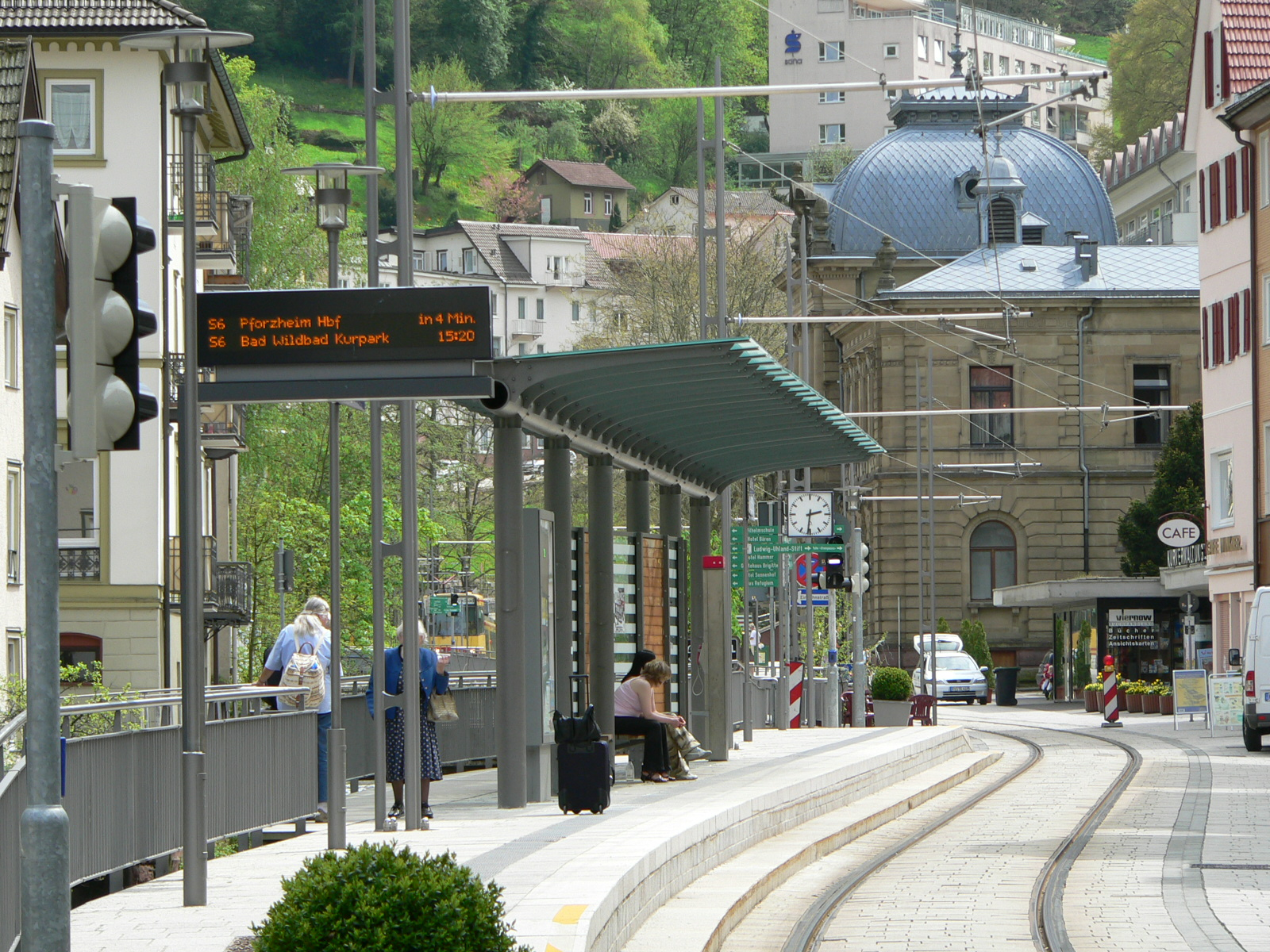
The Enz Valley Railway at Bad Wildbad

== History ==
The name "Wiltbade" first appeared in a historical document in the northern Black Forest in the year 1345. The earliest documented reference to Wildbad is a request for the appointment of a Wildbad chaplain addressed to the Bishop of Speyer in 1376. Wildbad was officially designated as an official town (Amtsstadt) in 1442 amidst the protracted territorial division of Württemberg. It is likely that the town and market privileges were conferred upon Wildbad in the early decades of the 15th century.

The thermal springs of the town have a historical utilization dating back to the Middle Ages. During the early modern period, particularly in the 16th and 17th centuries, the area began to emerge as a notable spa and health resort, capitalizing on its therapeutic waters. However, it was in the 19th century that Bad Wildbad ascended to international prestige as a fashionable luxury spa destination, distinguished by its advanced hydrotherapy practices and a growing reputation for elite wellness treatments. In the 19th century, the Palais Thermal was constructed to a design by Nikolaus Friedrich von Thouret and the baths remain in use.

== Geography ==
Bad Wildbad is picturesquely situated 420 m above sea level, in the romantic pine-clad gorge of the Enz, a tributary of the Neckar in the Black Forest. The town is 45 km west of Stuttgart, 50 km southeast of Karlsruhe, 30 km south of Pforzheim, and 23 km east of Baden-Baden.

Towering above Bad Wildbad is a small mountain, the Wildbader Sommerberg, whose top may be reached by the Sommerbergbahn, a funicular railway. It covers a vertical difference of about 300 m.

The area is considered picturesque especially due to the Wildsee — a small lake outside of town, measuring 2.3 ha, and at about 900 m above sea level.

A popular hiking trail, the Fautsburg Path, runs through Aichelberg.

== Culture ==
The annual Rossini in Wildbad opera festival, held in July, brings an international audience to the Kurhaus and the Königliches Kurtheater to hear belcanto works by Gioachino Rossini and his contemporaries.

The town is depicted in the novel Armadale by Wilkie Collins.

== Transportation ==
Bad Wildbad is connected to Germany's national rail network through the Karlsruhe Stadtbahn, line S6, running on the Enz Valley Railway. Being located deep in the northern Black Forest, Bad Wildbad has no direct connection with any Autobahn. The nearest one is just west of Pforzheim.

The town has a direct Tram link to Pforzheim by Line S6 which runs from the Kurpark in the town, along King Karl Street to the town's old railway station before heading out into the country via Calmbach, Höfen an der Enz, Neuenbürg and Birkenfeld.

== Famous residents ==
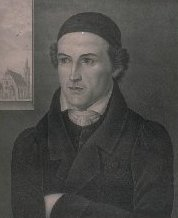
Ludwig Hofacker

- Ludwig Hofacker (1798–1828), Württemberg author, politician (Paulskirche) and translator (Aristophanes), was born in Wildbad.
- Justinus Kerner (1786–1862), poet, writer and physician.
- Ernst Zündel (1939–2017), Holocaust denier. He was born and raised in Calmbach and returned to live out his last years here following his deportation from Canada.
- Marcello Graca (born 1974), professional tennis player, grew up in Bad Wildbad.

== Events in Bad Wildbad ==
Duke Karl Alexander signed his contract (Schutzbrief) with the Jewish merchant and banker Joseph Ben Isachar Süßkind Oppenheimer in Bad Wildbad. Karl Alexander and his relationship with Oppenheimer is fictionally portrayed in Veit Harlan's antisemitic 1940 Nazi propaganda film titled Jud Süß.
