= Rác Thermal Bath =

Thermal bath in Budapest

Coordinates: 47°29′26″N 19°02′36″E

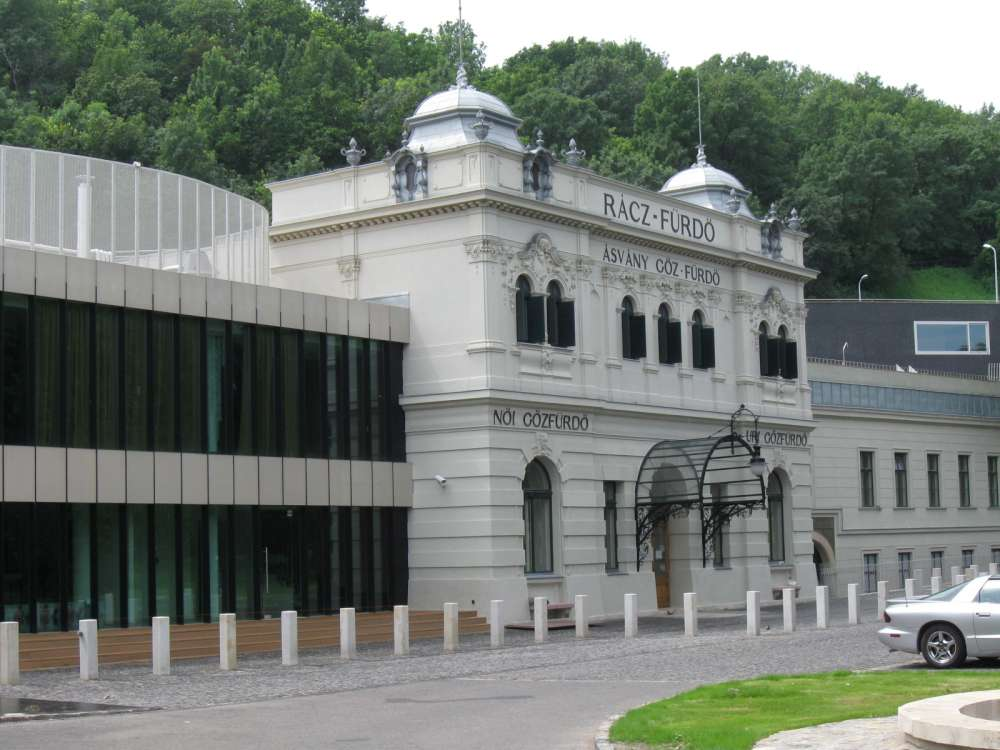
Entrance to the Rác thermal bath

The Rác Thermal Bath (Hungarian: Rácz gyógyfürdő, German: Raitzenbad), located in Budapest, Hungary, is an 8000-square metre bath and is renowned for its Turkish bath dating back to the 16th century, and its imperial pools and shower corridor built in the age of the Austro-Hungarian Monarchy. The bath is listed as a UNESCO World Heritage Site and is now part of the newly built complex of the Rác Hotel & Thermal Spa. Its name derives from an old Hungarian name for Serbs, one of the former inhabitants of diverse historical Tabán.

== History ==
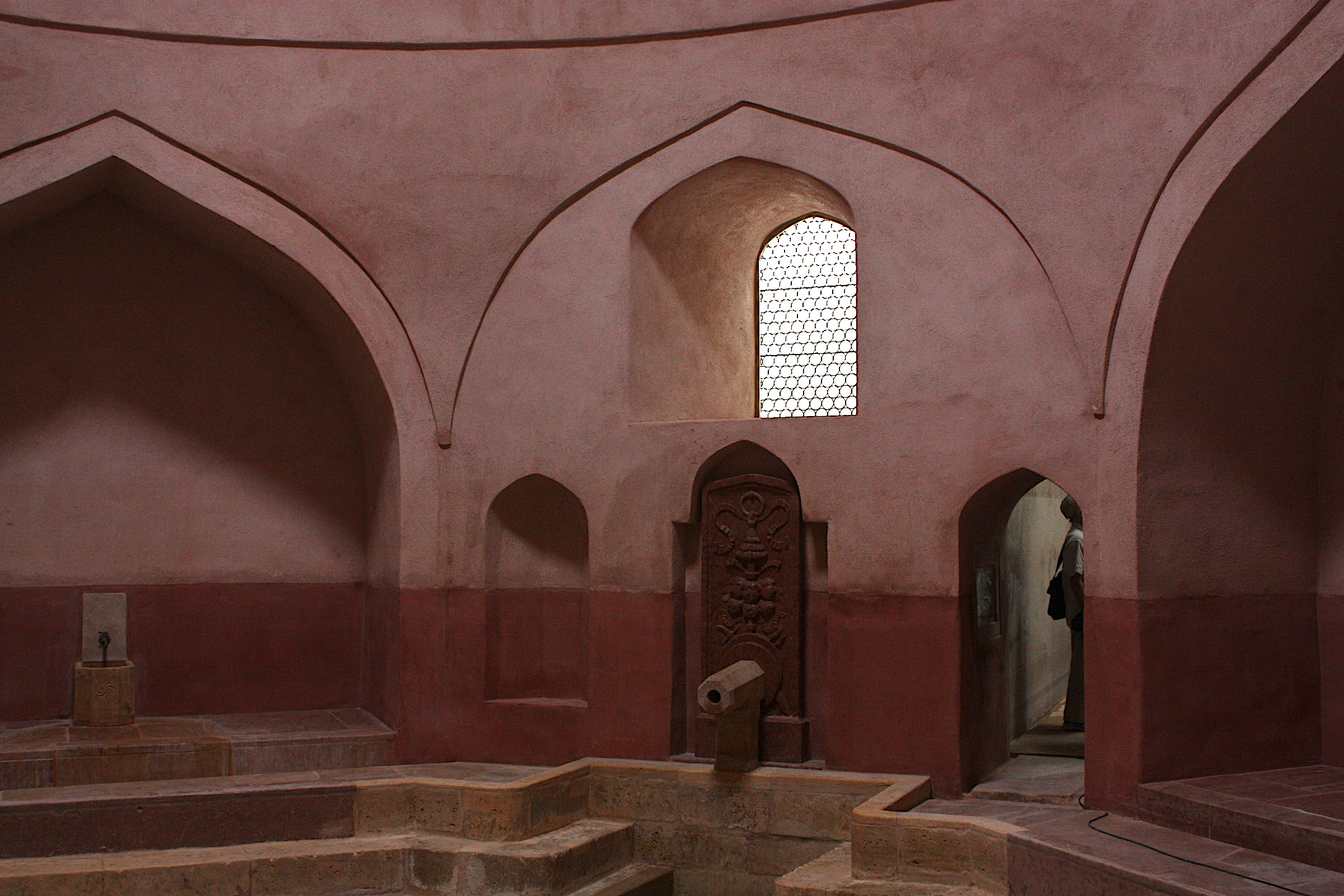
The Turkish bath

=== Turkish bath ===
The oldest part of the Rác Bath is the Turkish cupola, built in 1572, which was called Küçük Ilica ("Small Thermal Spring") at the time. It was commissioned by the civic judge of Pest and later owned by Buda governor Sokollu Mustafa Pasha and part of his endowment legacy. This cupola remained in a very good state through the centuries and therefore could be authentically restored. The windows, reveals, kurnas (marble basins on the walls), pool and floor are still the original ones perfectly renovated to their authentic state; thus it looks the same and can be used as it was in the 16th century. The side cupola adjacent to it was destroyed in 1905, and has also been restored according to its remains found by the archaeologists.

=== Ybl baths and shower corridor ===
The most impressive part of the Rác Bath was constructed and built by Miklós Ybl in two phases between 1865 and 1870. Approximately 30-40 percent of the romantic Ybl cupola and the famous shower corridor (1865) remained since it was subject to the Russian bomb attacks of World War II, renovation in the 1960s and also in 2002. The rest of this area was rebuilt and restored to its exact original state according to old copper engravings, drawings and documentations.

The second, imperial cupola, built in 1870, shows changes in the architect's perspective. Marble is the main material used, and several symbolic elements of the age's modernity can be found on the walls. This part was completely destroyed during the construction of the Elizabeth Bridge; however, the pieces demolished were buried in the pool and later provided essential information for the current reconstruction.

=== Flora bath ===
This section of the Rác Spa, also built in 1865, was styled after the ancient Roman baths, and now serves as the dedicated VIP section of the complex.

=== Modern-day spa ===
The last part of the bath was built adjacent to the historical buildings in the 21st century and accommodates the latest treatments and services, with 21 treatment rooms, a business room and a special VIP area.

== Water content ==
The many medical benefits of the Rác Bath's karst water are well known. The water contains calcium, magnesium, hydrogen-carbonate, sulphate-chloride, sodium and fluoride ions. The water, together with the services provided, offer recreation and are claimed to be beneficial for arthritis, spine illnesses, intervertebral disk pains, aortic stenosis, circulatory problems asthma and bronchitis. The complex has 11 pools. The water temperatures are 14 ˚C, 36 ˚C, 38 ˚C, and 42 ˚C.

== Sources ==
- Buzás, Gergely: Középkori fürdők (Műemlékvédelem, 2009 Vol. LIII. Issue 5. pp. 285–289)
- G. Lászay, Judit & Papp, Adrienn: A budai török fürdők kutatása az évezred elején (Műemlékvédelem, 2009 Vol. LIII. Issue 5. pp. 290–316)
