= Amel (disambiguation) =

Amel is a municipality and village in the German-speaking Community of Belgium.

Amel may also refer to:

- Amel (name)
- Amelogenin (AMELY and AMELX), sex determining DNA chromosomal markers
- Amel (river), a Belgian river also known as Amblève
- Amel (UAV), a drone
- Amel Yachts
- Amel Association International, a Lebanese non-profit non-governmental organization
