= Maharramov =

Maharramov is a surname. Notable people with the surname include:

- Amil Mammedali oglu Maharramov (born 1974), Azerbaijani economist
- Bahruz Maharramov (born 1983), Azerbaijani lawyer
- Jamshid Maharramov (born 1983), Azerbaijani footballer
- Mahammad Maharramov (1895–1982), Russian politician
- Malik Maharramov (1920–2004), Azerbaijani military officer
- Mammad Maharramov (1919–1977), Azerbaijani military officer
