= Alim (surname) =

Alim is an Arabic surname. Notable people with the surname include:

- Adidja Alim, Cameroonian politician
- Amat Al Alim Alsoswa (born 1958), Yemeni journalist, and Yemen's first female ambassador and minister
- A. K. M. Alim Ullah (born 1955), Bangladeshi politician
- Issam Alim, Egyptian Islamist
- Mamdouh Abdel-Alim, (1956 – 2016), Egyptian actor
- Mirza'ekber Alim (born 1995), Chinese footballer
- Muhammad Alim (1945 ― 2021), Indonesian judge and a justice on the Constitutional Court of Indonesia
- Rabeya Alim, Bangladesh Awami League politician and a member of the Bangladesh Parliament
- Qazi Abdul Alim (1933 – 2007), Bangladeshi athlete and sports organiser
- Saadah Alim (1897–1968), writer, playwright, translator, journalist and educator

== See also ==
- Alim
- Alim (disambiguation)
- Amil (disambiguation)
