= Alim (disambiguation) =

Alim is one of the Names of God in Islam.

Alim may also refer to:

- Alim (surname), Arabic surname
- Alim examination, government-run exam conducted under the Bangladesh Madrasa Board.
- Alim radar system, Iranian passive radar
- Alim Industries Limited, agricultural machinery manufacturer based in Sylhet, Bangladesh
- Alim-Tepe, village in Osh Region of Kyrgyzstan
- ʿālim, a scholar in Islam

== See also ==
- Amil (disambiguation)
