= Alim =

- Pronunciation: Arabic: [ʕaliːm]
- Gender: Male
- Language: Arabic

Origin
- Meaning: All-knowing one, He who has master self, Adept omniscient
- Region of origin: Middle East

Other names
- Alternative spelling: Aleem

Alim (or ʿAlīm عليم, also anglicized as Aleem) is one of the Names of God in Islam, meaning "All-knowing one". It is also used as a personal name, as a short form of Abdul Alim, "Servant of the All-Knowing".

== Given name ==
- Alim Ashirov (1955–1979), Soviet footballer
- Aleem Dar (born 1968), Pakistani cricketer
- Aleem Ford (born 1997), American-Puerto Rican basketball player
- Alim Karkayev (born 1985), Russian footballer
- Alim Khan (1774–1810), Khan of Kokand
- Alim Kouliev (born 1959), Russian-American actor and director
- Alim McNeill (born 2000), American football player
- Alim Öztürk (born 1992), Turkish footballer
- Alim Qasimov (born 1957), Azerbaijani musician
- Alim Qurbanov (born 1977), Azerbaijani footballer

=== Middle name ===
- Mohammed Alim Khan, last emir of the Manghit dynasty
- Mohammad Alim Qarar, member of the Wolesi Jirga for Laghman Province, Afghanistan

== Surname ==
- Alim (surname), surname
- Juice Aleem, British rapper
- Mariam A. Aleem (1930–2010), Egyptian artist and academic
- Obaidullah Aleem (1939–1998), Pakistani Urdu poet

== Other uses ==
- Ulama, plural of 'alim, an Islamic legal scholar

== See also ==
- Abd al-Alim
- Alimullah
- Alimuddin
