= Bahruz =

Bahruz (Azerbaijani: Bəhruz) is an Azerbaijani masculine given name. Notable people with the name include:

- Bahruz Kangarli (1892–1922), Azerbaijani artist
- Bahruz Maharramov (born 1983), Azerbaijani lawyer and politician
- Bahruz Teymurov (born 1994), Azerbaijani footballer
