= Emal =

Emal is an Afghan masculine given name. Notable people with the name include:

- Emal Pasarly (born 1974), Afghan multimedia editor for the BBC

== See also ==
- Amal (given name)
