= Emel =

Emel may refer to:

- Emel (magazine), a British Muslim lifestyle magazine
- EMEL Fashion, US based fashion designing firm co-founded by Taiwanese fashion designer Michelle Liu and Ken Wu in Los Angeles, CA.

== People ==
- Emel Aykanat (born 1975), Turkish-Swiss singer, popularly known as "Emel"
- Emel Dereli (born 1996), Turkish shot putter
- Emel Heinreich (born 1962), Austrian actress
- Emel Mathlouthi (born 1982), Tunisian singer also known as Emel
- Emel Say (1927–2011), Turkish painter
- Emel Sayın (born 1945), Turkish singer
- Emel Etem Toshkova (born 1958), Bulgarian politician of Turkish descent
- Emel Türkyılmaz (born 1992), Turkish basketball player
- Emel Vardar, Turkish artist

== See also ==
- Emmel, people with this surname
