= Amela =

Amel
- Gender: Female

Origin
- Meaning: Hope

Other names
- Variant form: Amila
- Related names: Amel

Amela is a given name and surname. It is derived from the Arabic name Amal (أمال) which means "hope."

In the Balkans, Amela is popular among Bosniaks in the former Yugoslav nations. It is a female given name in the region and the male equivalent is Amel. The name is an alternative variant to the name Amila, which is also popular among Bosniaks.

== Given name ==
- Amela Fetahović, Bosnian football player
- Amela Kršo (born 1994), Bosnian football player
- Amela Terzić (born 1993), Serbian middle-distance runner

== Surname ==
- Víctor Amela (born 1960), Spanish writer and journalist
