= Amal (given name) =

- Gender: Unisex

Origin
- Origin: Arabic, Hebrew
- Meaning: hope
- Region of origin: International

The sons of his brother Helem: Zophah, Imna, Shelesh and Amal

— Hebrew bible, 1 Chronicles 7:35

Amal (English: /əˈmɑːl/; Arabic: أمل, lit. 'hope'; not to be confused with عمل 'labor') is a unisex given name of Arabic and Hebrew origin.

Notable people with the name include:

- Amal Aden (born 1983), Somali–Norwegian writer
- Amal ibn Idris al-Alami (born 1950), Moroccan physician
- Amal Elsana Alh'jooj (born 1972), Bedouin Israeli activist
- Amal Arafa (born 1970), Syrian actress
- Amal Bayou (1957–2017), Libyan microbiologist and politician
- Amal Bourquia, Moroccan doctor, university professor, medical writer, and expert in ethics
- Amal Clooney (born 1978), Lebanese-British lawyer, activist, and author
- Amal Dunqul (1940–1983), Egyptian poet
- Amal Dutta (1930–2016), Indian footballer and manager
- Amal El-Mohtar (born 1984), Canadian poet, author, and editor
- Amal Habani (born 1974), Sudanese journalist
- Amal Hijazi (born 1978), Lebanese pop singer
- Amal Kassir (born 1995), Syrian American spoken word poet
- Amal Khalil (killed 2026), Lebanese journalist
- Amal Maher (born 1985), Egyptian singer
- Amal Mansour (1950–2018), Palestinian-Jordanian author and translator
- Amal McCaskill (born 1973), American basketball player
- Amal mint Maouloud (born 1983), Mauritanian engineer and politician
- Amal Murkus (born 1968), Palestinian singer
- Amal Nasser el-Din (1928-2025), Israeli author
- Amal Neerad (born 1983), Indian cinematographer, film director, and producer
- Amal Silva (born 1960), Sri Lankan cricketer
- Amal Syam (born 1969), Palestinian women’s rights advocate

== See also ==
- Amel (name)
- Emal, given name
- Emel, Turkish given name
- Little Amal, a giant puppet
- unrelated names: Amalia, Amaliah, Amelia
