= Amil (disambiguation) =

Amil is an American rapper and singer, born in 1973.

Amil may also refer to:

== Given name ==
Amil is a name of Arabic (see Amil) and Indian origin

- Amil Mammedali oglu Maharramov (born 1974), Azerbaijani economist
- Amil Niazi, Canadian writer, broadcaster and columnist
- Amil Shivji (born 1990), Indian-Tanzanian filmmaker
- Amil Yunanov (born 1993), Azerbaijani footballer

== Places ==
- Amil, a parish in Galicia also known as San Mamede de Amil
- Jabal Amil, a mountainous region in southern Lebanon

== See also ==
- Amillennialism
