= Emmel =

Emmel is a German surname. Notable people with the surname include:

- Manfred Emmel (1945–2025), German para table tennis player
- Paul Emmel (born 1968), American retired Major League Baseball umpire
- Stephen Emmel (born 1952), American Coptologist and musician

== See also ==
- Emmel Building, a historic building in Chicago, Illinois
- Richard Emmel Nugent (1902–1979), a United States Air Force general
- Emel (disambiguation)
