= Alimuddin =

Alimuddin (Arabic: علیم الدین) is the name of:

- Ilm-ud-Din or Alimuddin (1908–1929), Indian murderer
- Alimuddin Ahmad (1884–1920), Bengali activist and revolutionary
- Alimuddin (cricketer) (1930–2012), Pakistani cricketer
- Alimuddin Zumla (born 1955), British-Zambian professor of infectious diseases and international health
- Azim ud-Din I, also known as Alimuddin, eighteenth century Sultan of Sulu and Sabah
- Alimuddin Daeng Matiro, Indonesian regent

== See also ==
- Mohammad Alim Uddin (1940–2015), Bangladeshi politician
- Alim
- Uddin
