= Jordan Media Institute =

- معهد الإعلام الأردني
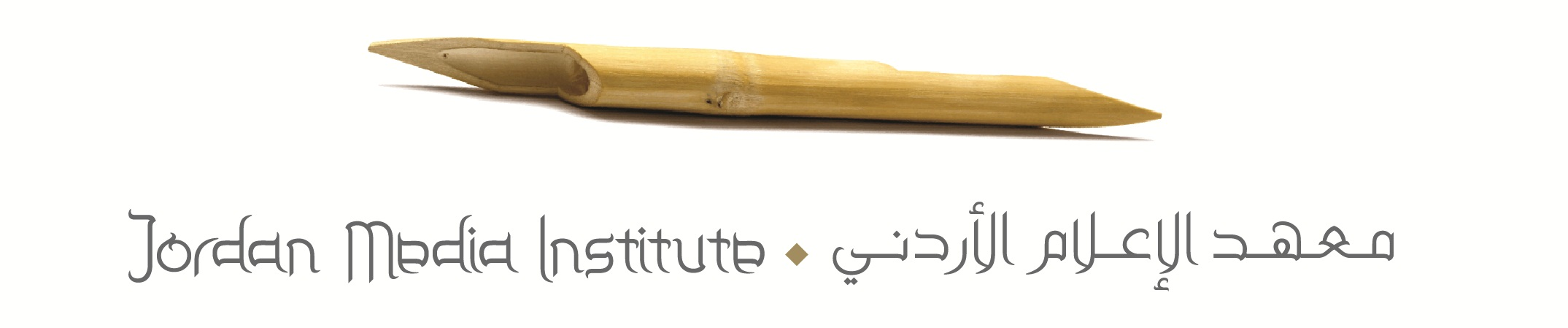
- Established: 2006
- Founder: Princess Rym Ali
- Dean: Ziad Rifai
- Location: Amman, Jordan; 32.0139°N 35.8728°E
- Nickname: JMI
- Website: www.jmi.edu.jo

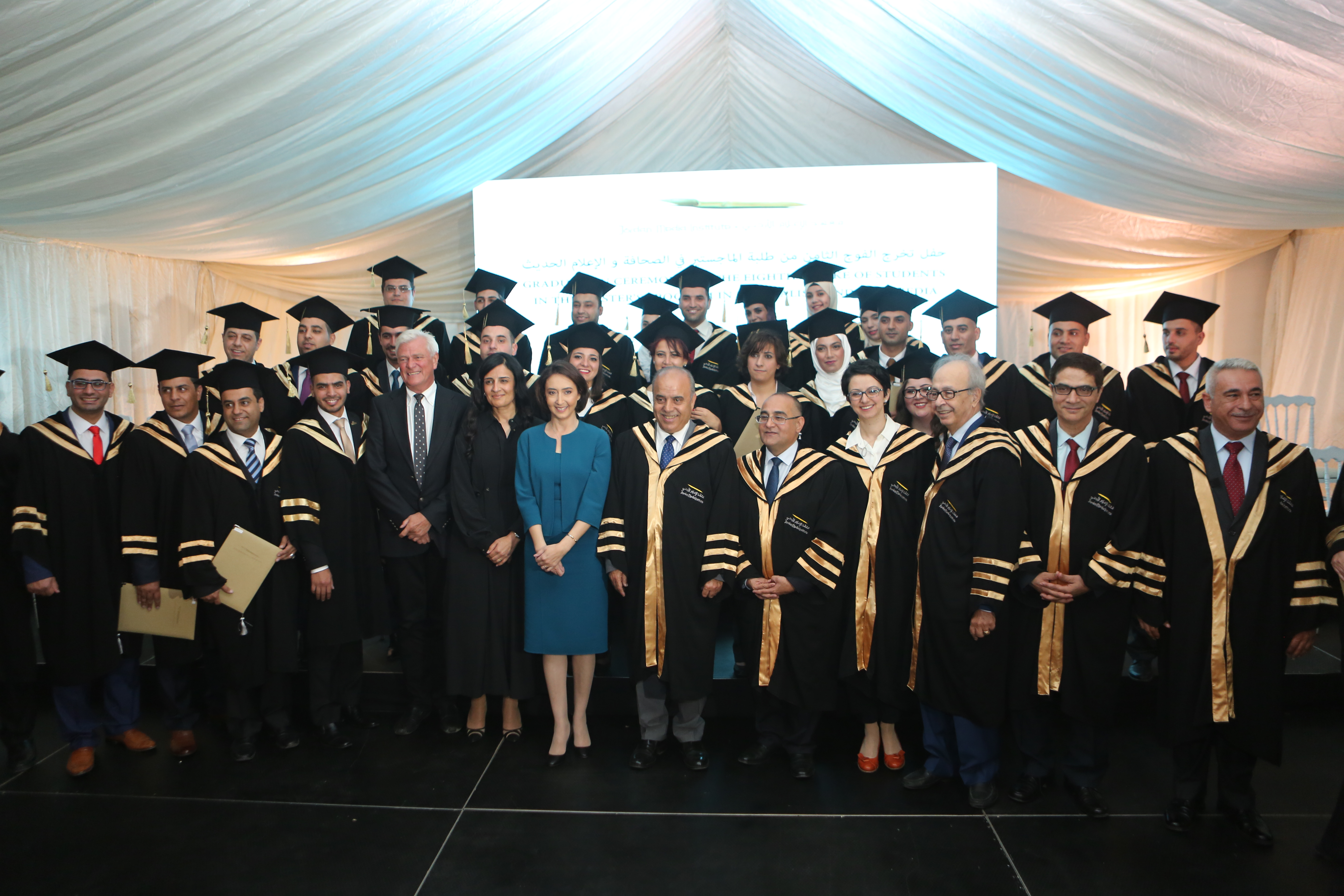
Princess Rym Ali at Graduation Ceremony of Eighth Intake of JMI Master's Students

The Jordan Media Institute (JMI) Is a non-profit educational entity in Amman, Jordan focusing on journalism.

== MA in Journalism and New Media ==
JMI offers a practical master's degree in journalism and New Media in cooperation with the University of Jordan in accordance with the academic agreement between the two institutions. An intensive professional development and training program catering to industry needs. The MA program has two tracks, a one–year Comprehensive track and a Thesis track. While JMI's language of instruction is Arabic, some classes and guest lectures are offered in English.

== Jordanian media credibility ==
Akeed is part of the King Abdullah II Fund for Development Democratic Empowerment Programme (Demoqrati) that adopted a series of criteria for verifying news published by local media outlets.

== Media and information literacy ==
The institute is work to enhance media literacy in Jordan and spreading the concepts and skills of positive interaction with the media and tools of communication technology and digital media, and to reduce their disadvantages. The main goals are improving the capabilities of society, especially new and young generations in dealing with the media and information sources and strengthening the capacity of young people to participate positively through the media, especially digital.

== Journalism training programs ==
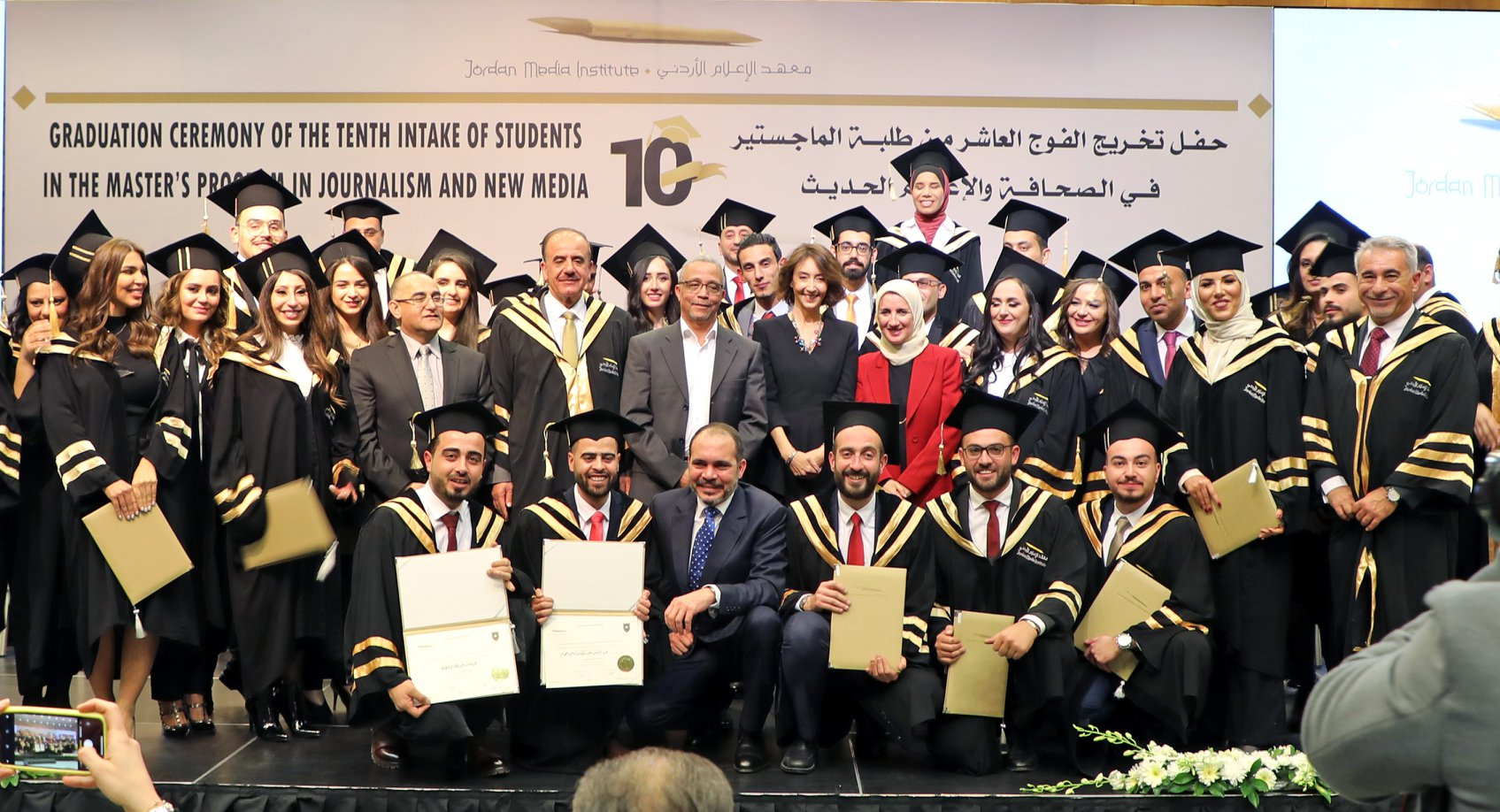
Prince Ali bin Hussein and Princess Rym Ali at Graduation Ceremony of Tenth Intake of JMI Master's Students

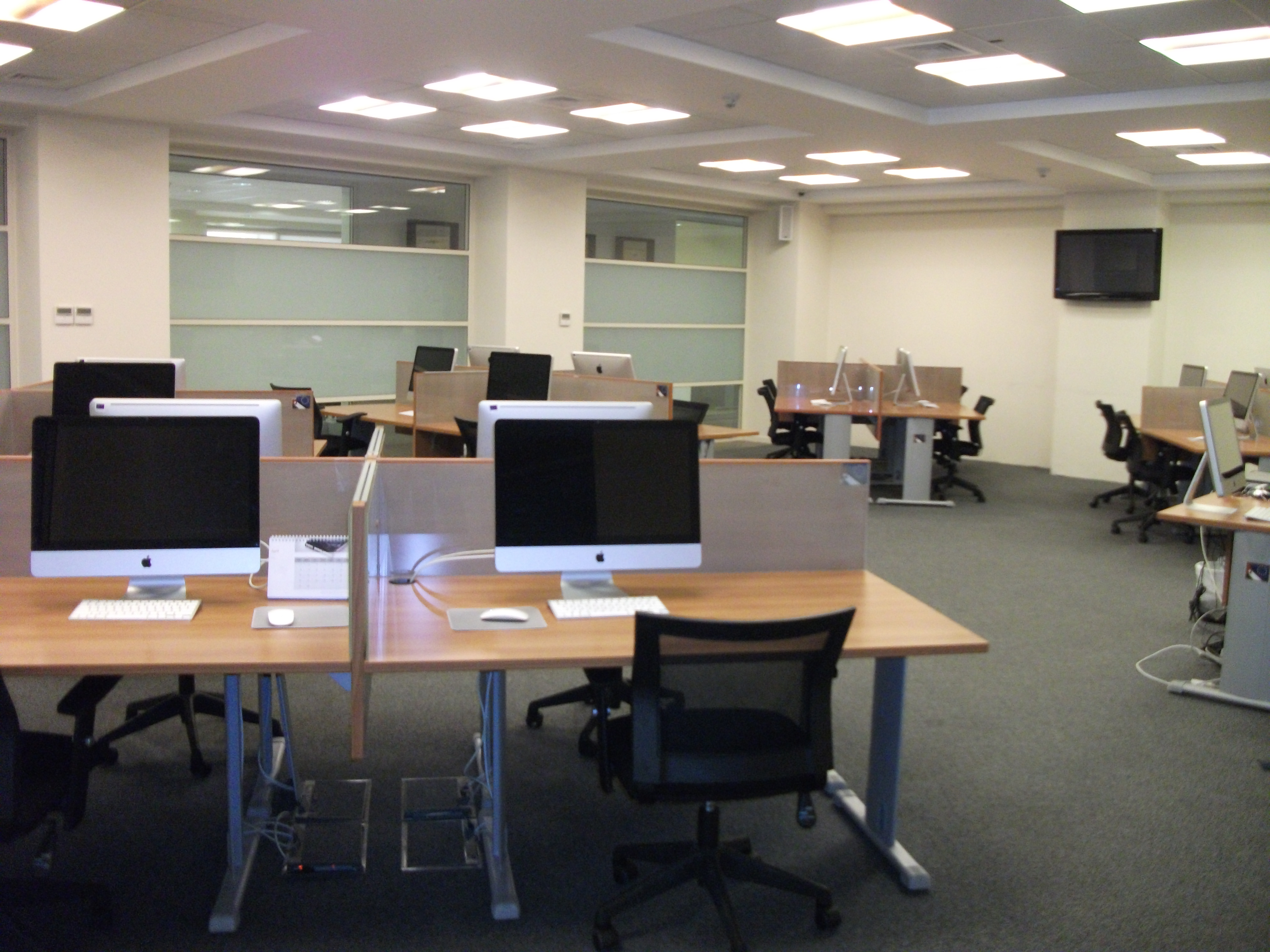
Newsroom at JMI

JMI held specialized training programs and workshops that provide professionals and students with the fundamentals of journalism.

JMI trainings held in partnership with:

- Arab League Educational, Cultural and Scientific Organization (ALECSO) located in Tunis
- Canadian International Development Agency
- Deutsche Gesellschaft für Internationale Zusammenarbeit GIZ
- DW Akademie
- European Union
- Forum of Federations
- International Center for Journalists located in Washington, D.C., United States
- International Labour Organization
- Ministry of Foreign Affairs (Norway)
- Norwegian Institute of Journalism
- UNICEF United Nations International Children's Emergency Fund
- UNESCO United Nations Educational, Scientific and Cultural Organization
- United States Agency for International Development (USAID).

== Founder of JMI ==
JMI was founded by Princess Rym Ali on August 14, 2006 and was officially established in February 2010.

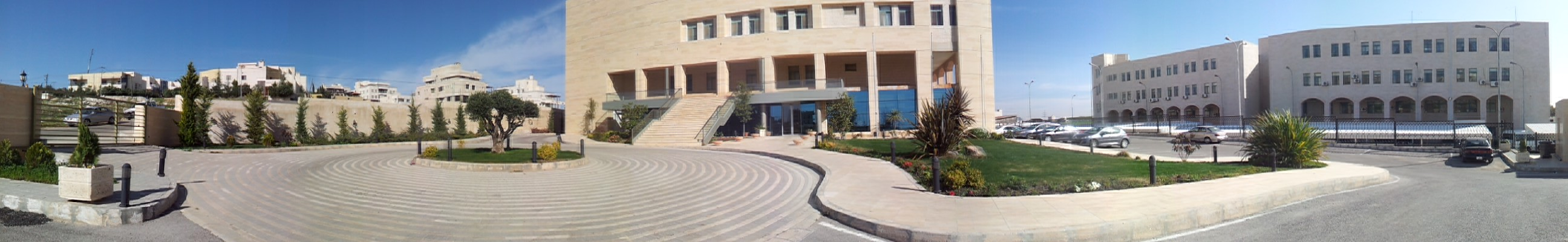
Jordan Media Institute.
