= Bıçaqçı =

- Municipality
- Location within Azerbaijan
- Coordinates: 40°18′08″N 47°28′10″E
- Country: Azerbaijan
- Rayon: Zardab
- Elevation: 3 m (9.8 ft)

Population
  - Total: 1,608
- Time zone: UTC+4 (AZT)
  - Summer (DST): UTC+5 (AZT)

Bıçaqçı (also, Bychagchy, Pichakchy, Pichakhchi, and Pichakhchy) is a village and municipality in the Zardab Rayon of Azerbaijan. It has a population of 1,608.

== Notable natives ==
- Melik Maharramov — Hero of the Soviet Union.
