= Amel (name) =

- Gender: Male and female

Other gender
- Feminine: Amela

Origin
- Meaning: Hope

Other names
- Variant forms: Amal, Amil, Emel

Amel is both a given name and a surname.

It is most likely the Maghrebine variant of the Arabic name Amal (أمال), which means "hope." The variant is quite popular in countries such as Algeria, Tunisia, and Morocco. In Algeria, it was the 10th most popular name during the 1990s.

The name may also appear with an accent on the e, forming variants like Amèl or Amél. These variants are a result of French influence on Maghreb countries. The Turkish variant of the name is Emel.

In the Balkans, Amel is popular among Bosniaks in the former Yugoslav nations. In this region, it is used as a male given name, while the female equivalent is Amela (for example, Amela Fetahović). The name is an alternative variant to the name Amil, which is also popular among Bosniaks.

== Given name ==
=== Males ===
- Amel Džuzdanović (born 1994), Slovenian footballer
- Amel Mekić (born 1981), Bosnian judoka
- Amel Mujčinović (born 1973), Bosnian football goalkeeper
- Amel Tuka (born 1991), Bosnian middle-distance runner

=== Females ===
- Amel Ait Ahmed (born 1989), Algerian handball player
- Amel Bent (born 1985), French singer
- Amel Bouchoucha (born 1982), Algerian actress, singer and TV presenter
- Amel Bouderra (born 1989), French basketball player
- Amel Brahim-Djelloul (born 1975), Algerian soprano opera singer and concert recitalist
- Amel Karboul (born 1973), Tunisian politician and business leader
- Amel Khamtache (born 1981), Algerian volleyball player
- Amel Larrieux (born 1973), American singer-songwriter and keyboardist
- Amel Majri (born 1993), French-Tunisian footballer
- Amel Senan (born 1966), Iraqi-Turkmen actress

== Surname ==
- Arash Amel (born 1976), screenwriter and film producer from Wales
- Mahdi Amel (1936–1987), Arab Marxist intellectual and political activist
