= Amal Mansour =

Palestinian-Jordanian author and translator

- Born: Amal Murshid Abu Salah; 1950; Shweika, Tulkarm, Palestine
- Died: 31 October 2018 (aged 67–68); Amman, Jordan
- Occupations: Translator; Writer
- Spouse: Khairy Mansour
- Children: 2

Amal Murshid Abu Mansour (Arabic: أمل منصور) (née Salah; 1950 – 31 October 2018) was a Palestinian-Jordanian author and translator to Arabic from English who focused on the genres of education, mathematics, science fiction and science. She had previously worked for the Kuwait Credit and Savings Bank and was secretary for the library of the Executive Office for Occupied Land Affairs in Amman. Mansour was murdered by stabbing in late 2018.

== Life and career ==
Mansour was born in 1950, in Shweika, which is located in the Tulkarm municipality of Palestine. She was the daughter of the commerce worker Murshid Abu Salah. Mansour was educated at Tulkarm Primary School before going on to be taught at Al-Asma'i School and completed her secondary education at Al-Adawiya Secondary School for Girls in the West Bank. She graduated with a Bachelor of Arts degree in English Language and Literature.

Mansour first developed an interest in children's literature when she was taken by her school teacher to go to the local municipal library at the age of nine years old. From 1967 to 1974, Mansour worked for the Kuwait Credit and Savings Bank, before moving to Jordan and resided in Amman. She thus became a secretary for the library of the Executive Office for Occupied Land Affairs between 1975 and 1977. Mansour relocated to Baghdad to be employed in Iraq's Culture House Children between 1977 and 1987. She was a contributor to the editing of the children's magazines Al-Muzmar, My Magazine and Science and Technology.

Mansour was the author, the preparator and translator of works for children including Ahmed's Return, A Journey Between the Planets, Fire Birds, Khaled bin Walid, Tariq bin Ziyad, The Three Rays of the Suns, The Unknown Article and The War of the Worlds. She published the books Archeology Book, Colorful Stories, Daughter of the Earth, Fifty Facts About Robots, Folk Tales of Free Asian, Interplanetary Tour, Little Sewing, Me and My Daughter, My First Book on the Universe, Myths and Tales, The Basket, The Cart and The Road to San Giovanni. Mansour also translated several publications from English, which were Bint Arab: Arab and Arab American Women in the United States, Cage Adventure, Crime and Punishment, Measures of Success, My Science for Children, The Birth of Science, The Child in the Family, The Hunchback of Notre-Dame, The Odyssey, The Selfish Genie and The Three Puppet Makers. The genres she focused on were educational, mathematics, science fiction and scientific and the works she authored or translated were published by Kuwait's Anahid House and Dar Anahid House as well as Jordan's Ministry of Culture.

== Personal life ==
She was married to the Palestinian poet and writer Khairy Mansour until his death in September 2018. They had two children.

== Murder ==
In Mansour's home in the western Amman suburb of Rasheed on the morning of 31 October 2018, the author was killed when she was stabbed eight times reportedly by an Ugandan-born maid whom she had employed for 13 years. The maid stole some of Mansour's possessions inside the house and subsequently attempted to flee Jordan but was arrested when passport officers at Queen Alia International Airport learnt of the author's murder from her son. She was barred from leaving Jordan and an investigation was opened into Mansour's murder. Akeed observed the media coverage of the culprit's identity as well as the newspaper headlines of the murder of Mansour.
