= Amil (name) =

Arabic given name

- Pronunciation: Arabic: [ʕaː.mil] Persian: [ʕɒː.mel]
- Gender: Male

Origin
- Languages: Arabic (عَامِل); Persian (عامل)
- Meaning: a hardworking person, doer, striver, etc.

Other names
- Alternative spelling: Aamil, Amel
- Variant forms: Âmil (Turkish); Ğamil (Tatar); Ğəmil (Bashkort)
- Derived: From root: ع م ل (ʕ-m-l); "working, doing"

Amil (also Aamil and Amel; عَامِل, ʻĀmil), is an Arabic given name, used among different Islamic peoples, such as the Persians and Azerbaijanis. The name is interpreted to mean "a hardworking person, doer, striver", among other similar descriptions. As a word it appears in the Qur'an.

(Moroccan Arabic).

(Persian).

== History ==
The name comes from root ع م ل (ʕ-m-l), which is related to "working, doing".

According to a Turkish Encyclopedia, âmil ( العامل, el-Âmil, al-Āmil) is mentioned in the Qur'an. In the Qur'an, it is used "mostly in relation to those who do good or bad deeds and also in zakat matters".

In the Ottoman Empire, âmil was also used in relation to an officer in charge of tax collecting, as well as a tax-farmer, or a person who collects on behalf of a tax-farmer.

== Variants ==
Âmil (Turkish), Ğamil (Гамил, Tatar), Ğəmil (Ғәмил, Bashkort).

In the Balkans, Amil is popular among Bosniaks in the former Yugoslav nations. In this region, it is used as a male given name, while the female equivalent is Amila (for example, Amila Glamočak). The name is an alternative variant to the name Amel, which is also popular among Bosniaks. This however might rather be rooted in the Arabic أمل (ʾamal), meaning "hope, aspiration".

== Homonymous names ==
Amil is also a Galician surname and given name totally unrelated with the Arabic one. In this case, Amil comes from a place name in Galicia (see Amil (Galicia)), derived from the genitive of a possessor name of Germanic origin Alamirus, formed from the Gothic elements alls (all) and mereis (famous, renowned).

In Hindi use, the name Amil does also not seem to have an Arabic root.

== Notable people ==
- Âmil Çelebioğlu (1934–1995), Turkish language and literature researcher
- Amil Məhərrəmov (born 1974), Azerbaijani economist and professor
- Amil Yunanov (born 1993), Azerbaijani footballer
- Amil Shivji (born 1990), Tanzanian filmmaker
- Amil Kahala Whitehead (born 1973), American former rapper and singer
