= Princess Rym Ali =

Jordanian princess (born 1969)

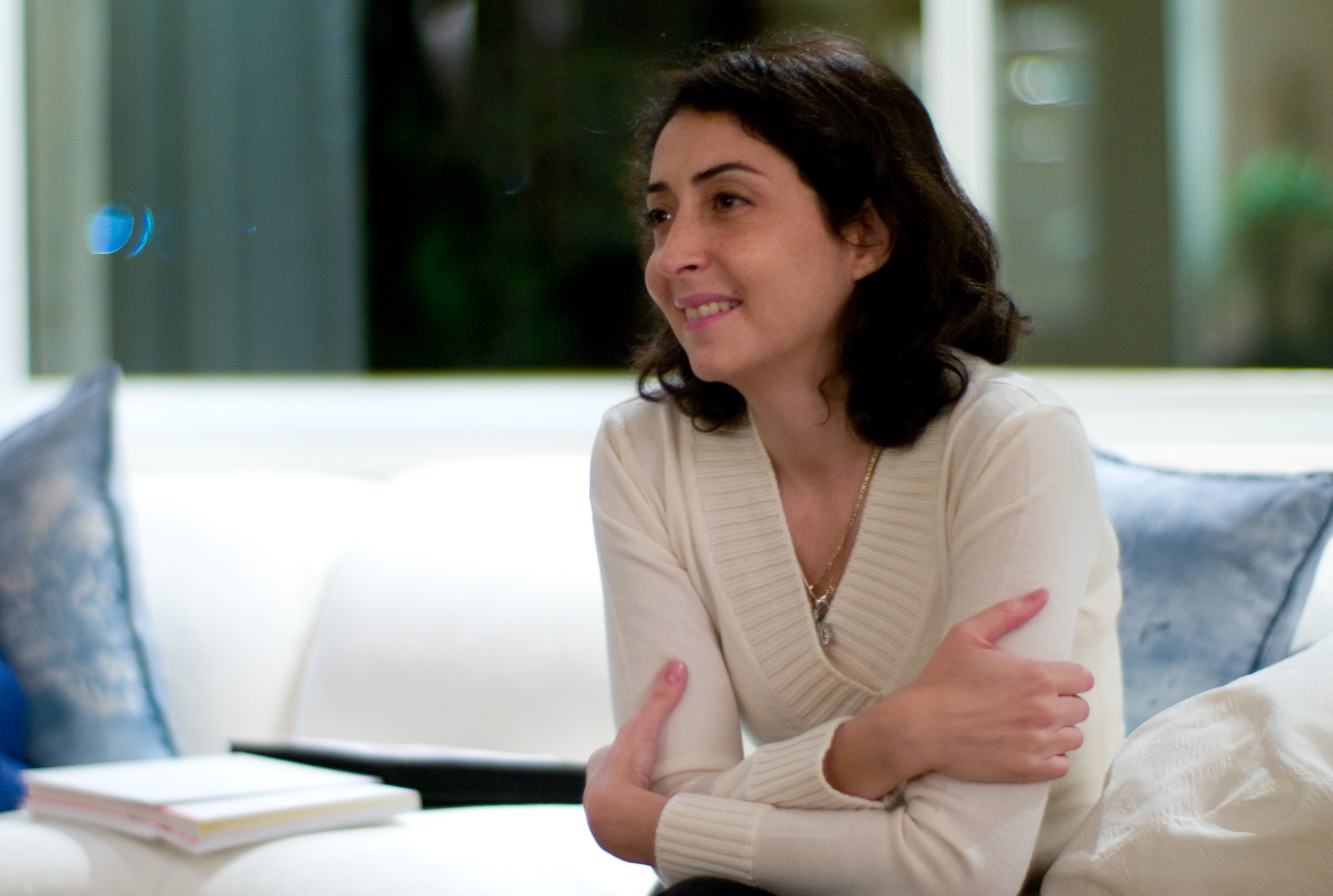
- Born: Rym Brahimi; 1969 (age 55–56); Cairo, Egypt
- Spouse: Prince Ali bin Hussein (m. 2004)
- Issue: Princess Jalila; Prince Abdullah
- House: Hashemite (by marriage)
- Father: Lakhdar Brahimi
- Mother: Mila Bacic

Princess Rym Ali (née Rym Brahimi; born 1969) is the Algerian wife of Prince Ali bin Hussein of Jordan, whom she married on 7 September 2004. She is a former journalist.

== Early life ==
She is the daughter of Lakhdar Brahimi, former Algerian Minister for Foreign Affairs and senior UN official, and Mila Bacic, who is of half-Croatian and half-Armenian descent. She was raised in the United Kingdom and Algeria, and was educated in France and the United States.

== Education ==
As Rym Brahimi, the Princess received a BA in geography and an MA in English literature at the Sorbonne University in Paris, graduating with honors in 1990; a MPhil in political science at the Institut d'Études Politiques de Paris in Paris in 1991; and a Master's degree from the Columbia University Graduate School of Journalism, concentrating on international reporting, in 1994.

== Career ==
Prior to marrying Prince Ali, Princess Rym worked extensively for international broadcasters including CNN, where she began as a producer in 1998 and later worked as a Baghdad correspondent from 2001 until 2004. She had developed her portfolio working for the BBC, Dubai TV, Bloomberg TV, Radio Monte-Carlo Moyen-Orient and United Press International-UPI.

She has been the Executive Commissioner of the Royal Film Commission – Jordan since July 2005. She is the founder of the Jordan Media Institute (JMI), a non-profit institution whose aim is to establish an Arab center of excellence for journalism education with a Master's program at its core and training-modules in parallel. She is also the president of the Amman International Film Festival "AIFF" Awal Film since 2017.

== Awards and honours ==
=== National ===
- Jordan
  - Grand Cordon of the Order of the Star of Jordan

=== Honours ===
- France: Knight of the Order of Legion of Honour (20 September 2011)
- Norway: Grand Cross of the Royal Norwegian Order of Merit (2 March 2020)
- Portugal: Grand Officer of the Order of Prince Henry (5 April 2018)
- Sweden: Member Grand Cross of the Order of the Polar Star (15 November 2022)

=== Awards ===
- In April 2011, Princess Rym Ali received a prestigious award from the Columbia University School of Journalism. The Alumni Awards are presented annually for a distinguished journalism career, an outstanding journalistic achievement, or a notable contribution to journalism education.
- In July 2011, was awarded the "Best International Journalist" prize at the 32nd Ischia International Journalism Awards Ceremony, one of the most prestigious journalistic awards in Italy.
- In October 2012, she was awarded the Global Thinkers Forum 2012 Award for Excellence in Media for her exceptional work with the Jordan Media Institute (JMI).
- In November 2013, she was awarded an Honorary Doctorate of Letters by the United Kingdom's Coventry University for her contribution to the field of journalism and media, and her role in establishing the Jordan Media Institute (JMI).
- In November 2017, America Abroad Media Awarded their annual prize to Princess Rym Ali, for her significant role in media, at the 5th annual "Power of Film" Awards in Washington DC. The award honors leaders whose work exemplifies the power of media to inform, educate and empower.

== Personal life ==
She and Prince Ali live in Amman with their two children Princess Jalila bint Ali and Prince Abdullah bin Ali.
