= Abdul Latif Daeng Masikki =

Indonesian politician

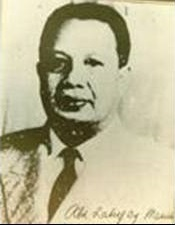

Mayor of Makassar
- In office 1958–1960
- President: Sukarno
- Preceded by: Mohammad Junus Daeng Mile
- Succeeded by: H. Aroepala

Regent of Poso
- In office 1952–1954
- President: Sukarno
- Preceded by: None
- Succeeded by: Alimuddin Daeng Matiro

Abdul Latif Daeng Masikki was the first regent of Poso Regency, Central Sulawesi, Indonesia; who ruled from 1952 to 1954. As the first regent of Poso, he was also the first regent derived from the military.

He was succeeded by Alimuddin Daeng Matiro.
