= Emmel Building =

- U.S. National Register of Historic Places
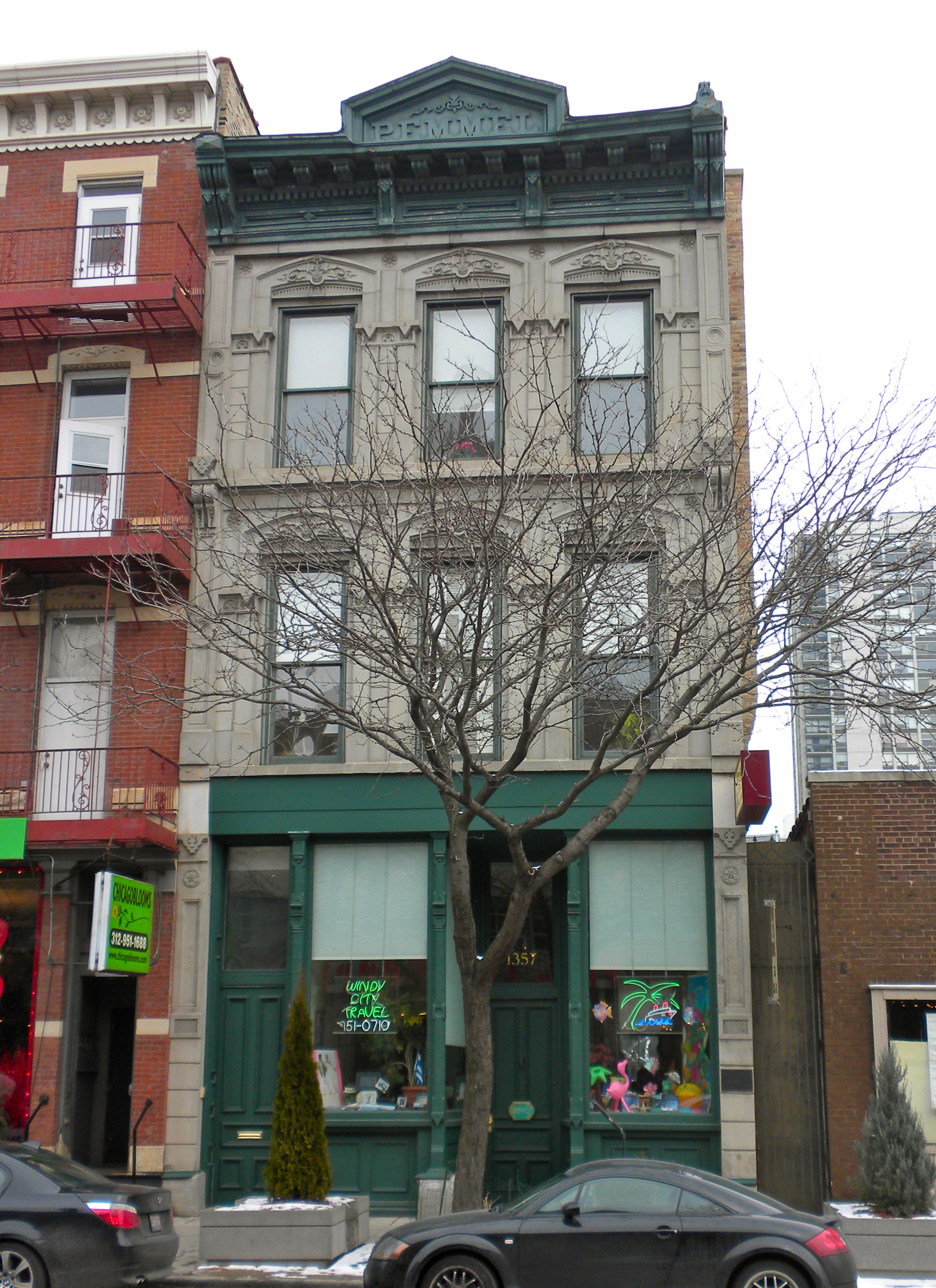

- Location within Illinois Location within the United States
- Location: 1357 N. Wells St., Chicago, Illinois
- Coordinates: 41°54′26″N 87°38′3″W
- Area: less than one acre
- Built: 1875
- Architectural style: Italianate
- NRHP reference No.: 84000283
- Added to NRHP: November 13, 1984

The Emmel Building is a historic building located at 1357 North Wells Street in the Near North Side neighborhood of Chicago, Illinois. The building is an example of a store and flat building, with a commercial space on the first floor and residential space on the upper two floors. Peter Emmel, a painter and interior decorator who came to Chicago from Germany in 1854, had the building built for his business and family. The building has an Italianate design with intricate carved stone on the second and third floors of the front facade. A metal cornice with brackets and a gable tops the building. While the building's layout is similar to the store and flat buildings of the commercial district to the south, its architecture is closer to that of the homes in the nearby Gold Coast.

The building was added to the National Register of Historic Places on November 13, 1984.
