= Amel Association International =

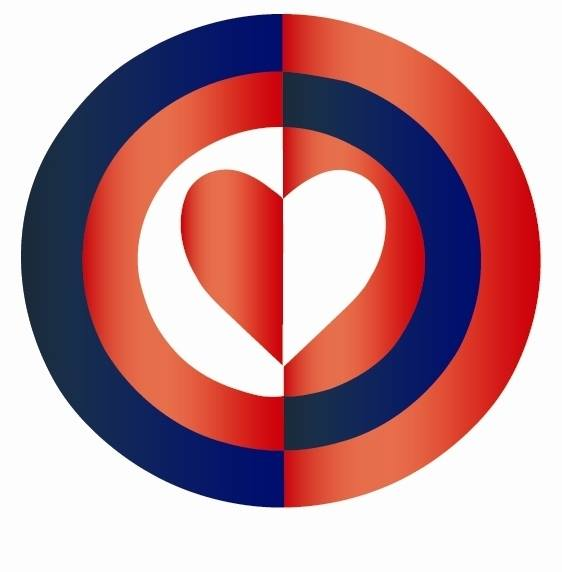
- Founded: 1979
- Founder: Kamel Mohanna
- Type: Non Governmental Organization
- Purpose: Support the needy populations of Lebanon, local or foreign (emergency care education, health, vocational training, human rights)
- Headquarters: Liban, Monde
- Location: Beirut (Lebanon)
- Key people: Kamel Mohanna (president)
- Website: http://www.amel.org/

Amel Association is a Lebanese, non-sectarian, non-profit non-governmental organization (NGO), created by Kamel Mohanna in 1979, in response to the Israeli invasion of 1978.

Being active both on emergency projects as well as longer-term development projects, it aims to provide support to the most in-need populations in Lebanon (locals or foreigners), through its 24 centers and 6 mobile clinics in the most disadvantaged areas of Lebanon (South Beirut suburbs, Bekaa region and South-Lebanon). In 2010, the Association established Amel Association International and opened representation in Geneva. Since 2010, Amel has had a consultative status to the United Nations Economic and Social Council (ECOSOC) and has been a member of the Collective of Lebanese NGOs, the Collective of Arab NGOs, the ICVA, the Global Coalition for Social Protection, and many other networks.

== Lebanese Civil War and creation of the association ==
Amel was born in 1979 in reaction to the second Israeli invasion of South Lebanon (Operation Litani) which led to several massacres, much displacement and destruction of Lebanese infrastructure. In this context, Dr. Kamel Mohanna, a doctor from Khiam (South Lebanon) created Amel Association with the help of a group of professors, journalists and intellectuals Hence, through its 27 centers and dispensaries, its 3 rural hospitals, its important civil defense team and its 30 ambulances, Amel engaged in emergency and assistance actions targeting the victim populations.

== Peace settlement and development of the association ==
In 1989, the Taef Agreements put an end to 15 years of civil war and marked the beginning of a progressive return to peace in the country. After 10 years of emergency relief and assistance to people wounded in war, Amel decided to move from an emergency approach to a longer-term development approach, embodied by an interim restructuring (election of a new board committee and reorganization of centers and tasks).

== 2012-2014: Syrian crisis and emergency response ==
In April 2012, a wide and comprehensive program named "Syrian Refugee Emergency Response" was implemented in order to guarantee decent conditions of living to all the populations affected by the conflict (to both refugees populations and host populations (by providing them for example primary healthcare, food and clothes distribution).

== Vision and principles ==
Amel Association is committed to a universal and international vision of human rights, a vision of moving towards building a common future with the spirit of human solidarity that seeks to serve the just causes of the world. One of the main objectives of Amel Association is to endorse the sense of belonging and citizenship in the Lebanese and Arab communities, a belonging that maintains the civil rights of each citizen that protect him from all forms of discrimination based on color, religion, or political affiliations.

At this point, the aim of spreading the culture of rights is to make people more aware and conscious of their fundamental rights, especially children, women and people with special needs, to be able to defend them, which will foster the building of a citizenship of equivalent rights and duties.

== Amel in Action ==
=== Health Program ===
Amel organizes several campaigns of free vaccination, distribution of medicines and medical consultations in order to ensure general and systematic access to primary health care for everyone, in collaboration with local institutions and schools.

=== Education, Child protection and Psychosocial support to families ===
The education projects implemented by Amel seek to reinforce the equal rights of education for every children. They mainly consist of remedial summer courses for out-of-school children or for those in an accelerated learning program (ALP). The Association also provided psycho-social support and assistance for the most impoverished families through the production and diffusion of educative material, the implementation of kinder gardens, day care centers and prevention sessions on several themes (child labor, domestic violence, teenager psychology, etc.). Those initiatives are completed through recreation activities aiming to promote the values of friendship, respect and tolerance among children, as well as nurturing their creativity and their self-perception of their rights.

=== Vocational Training and Human Capacity Development ===
Improving individual personal abilities, in particular those of women and youth, is an important part of Amel strategy. On that matter, Amel has set up vocational and educational training programs in several centers since 1990.

=== Protection of Migrant Domestic Workers ===
This program is set to raise awareness on their rights and to clarify the responsibilities and duties of employers over their employees in order to prevent abuses. Examples of activities: English lessons, awareness sessions, psychological support and capacity development workshops.

Since March 2012, Amel has been part of a consortium of NGOs to reinforce coordination and assistance to this population.

=== Rural Development ===
An agricultural cooperative project was started in April 2004 in Ebl el-Saqi thanks to a collaboration with European Commission and the Italian NGO "Africa 70." This cooperative is dedicated to the production of organic soap from essential oils and medicinal plants.

== Anchorage in Lebanese civil society, and main partners ==
Cooperation and coordination with other actors has always been a core principle of the association. In 2003, Dr. Kamel Mohanna was appointed General Coordinator of the Lebanese NGO Network and General Coordinator of the Arab NGO Network.

Main partners of Amel in 2014 are:

=== International NGOs ===
ANERA, Danida, DRC, Open Society Institute, OXFAM GB, OCHA, IOCC (International Orthodox Christian Charities), Caritas, Save the Children International, Anna Lindh Foundation, Medico International, Médecins du Monde

=== International Organizations and UN Agencies ===
UNFPA, UN Women, UNAOC, World Health Organization, International Medical Corps (IMC), European Commission, International Labour Organization, UNDP, UNHCR, UNICEF World Bank.

=== Local (private and public) organizations ===
Ministry of Social Affairs, Ministry of Health, Ministry of youth and Sports, Catharsis, NEO, Youth for development, Culture and sciences foundation, American University of Beirut, Arab thoughts foundation, Cooperation services provided by embassies of France (including the Social Development Fund), Germany (including the GFO), Canada, and Norway Embassies in Beirut, Lebanese American University, Université La Sagesse, USJ
