= Emal Pasarly =

Afghani-born British multimedia editor (born 1974)

- Born: 1974 (age 51–52); Kunduz, Afghanistan
- Occupations: Journalist, news presenter, Writer
- Employer: BBC
- Television: Stasy Ghag; FekerLari
- Spouse: Fareba Pasarly (2003–present)
- Children: 2 (daughter and a son)

Emal Pasarly is the multimedia editor for BBC.

== Personal life ==
Emal Pasarly was born in the northern province of Kunduz, Afghanistan, to an upper-middle-class family. As a result of the Russian invasion of Afghanistan, his family migrated to neighboring Pakistan. He moved to London in 1993 and began working with the BBC World Service in 1996.

== Journalism ==
Pasarly has been working for the BBC for almost 20 years. He has interviewed a number of well known Afghan and international politicians and opposition figures including David Miliband, a former British Labour Party politician who was the Member of Parliament for South Shields from 2001 to 2013, and was the Secretary of State for Foreign and Commonwealth Affairs from 2007 to 2010. His other notable interviews were with Mullah Omar, the leader of the Afghan Taliban movement who controlled Afghanistan from 1994 to 2001 before they were driven out by American and allied forces. Pasarly has interviewed the secretive one-eyed leader Mullah Omar three times by phone in four- or five-minute conversations that were recorded on the spot without prior arrangement. The last such conversation took place late in 2001, after US B-52 bombers had started pounding Taliban-controlled areas. Pasarly later told an Aljazeera reporter about his experience of interviewing Mullah Omar. "The impression I was left with is that he either does not understand the nuances of issues, or that he is too smart and does not want to give clues on his inner thoughts".

== Writing ==
Pasarly also writes fiction in Pashto; he is the author of several books including three novels, 11 collections of short stories, a collection of plays and 6 non-fiction book about online journalism including the History of Afghan cricket. Before joining the BBC Pasarly was the editor of a monthly magazine called DEWA, for Pashto literature in London.
