= Akeed =

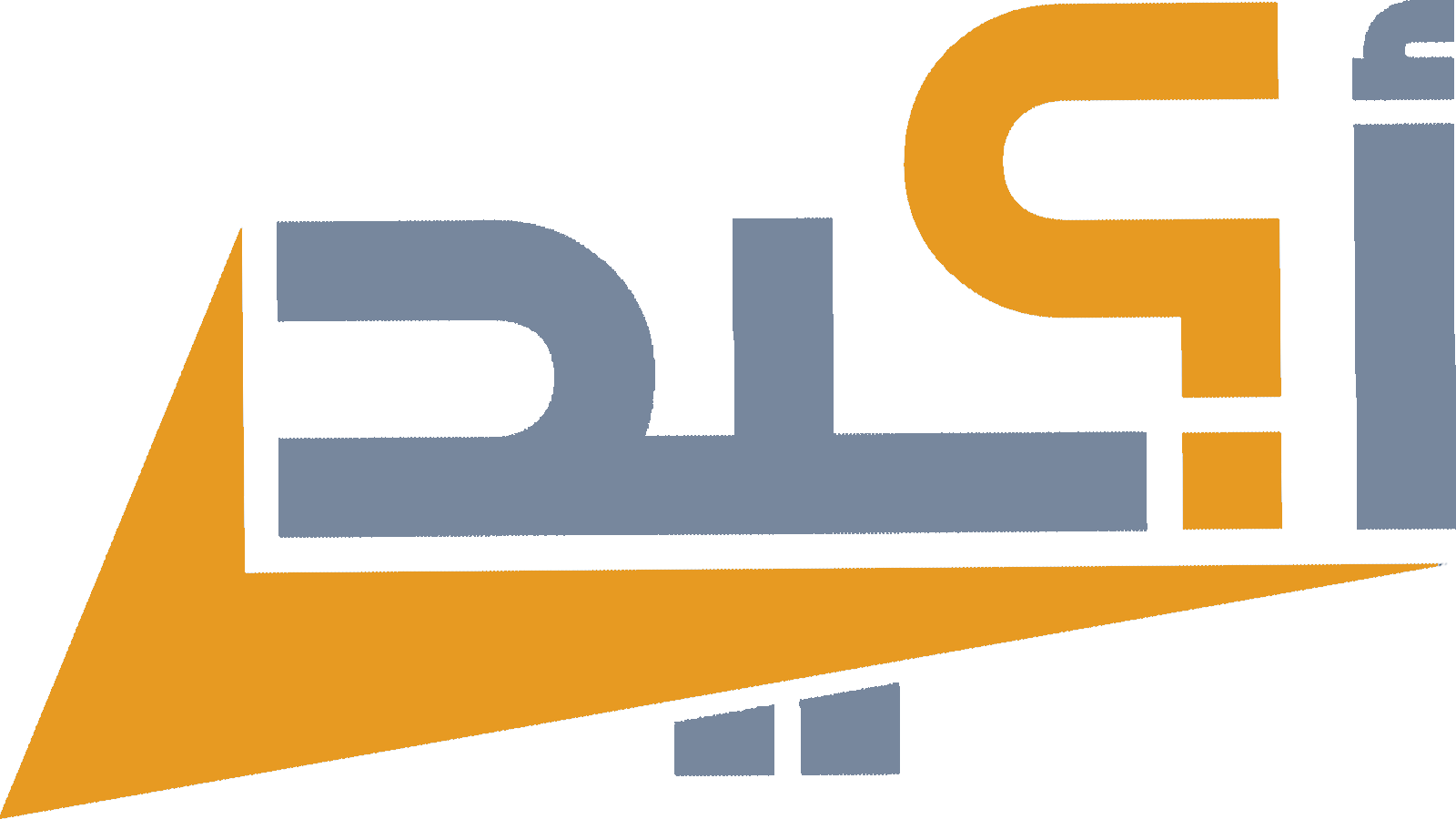
- Founded: 2014
- Website: Akeed

The Jordanian Media Credibility Monitor "Akeed" is a tool that tracks the content of media outlets in Jordan and claims to track the credibility of news material that is published and broadcast by Jordanian media outlets. It is one of the projects of the Jordan Media Institute.

Akeed was founded in 2014 with support from the King Abdullah Fund for Development as part of the Democratic Empowerment Programme. It is intended to holds Jordanian media outlets accountable, and to examine the credibility of news material that is published and broadcast. It also publishes periodic reports on the news.
