= Amel Yachts =

French sailboat producer based in La Rochelle

Chantiers Amel
- Founded: 1965
- Founder: Henri Amel
- Headquarters: La Rochelle, France
- Products: Sailboats
- Website: amel.fr

Chantiers Amel is a French shipyard founded by Henri Amel in 1965. Based in La Rochelle, Amel is known for its production of ocean-going sailboats.

== History ==
Yacht designer Henri Amel founded Chantiers Amel in 1965. During World War II, Amel noticed that the floating caissons used by invading Allied naval forces in France relied on polyester resin construction, which he would ultimately adopt in the production of his boats.

Amel's first boat, the Super Mistral Sport, was built in Marseille after he took over a failing shipyard. The boat itself was a success, but the business failed. In 1963, Amel began building boats in the shipyard of another builder at La Rochelle. He split off on his own, founding Chantiers Amel in 1965. A fire burned his new shipyard to the ground in 1967, but it was rebuilt and a success by 1973.

Amel was blind for an extended period of his career.

At the time of his death in 2005, Amel donated 12,000 of his 13,000 shares in Chantier Amel to the company's employees.

== Boats ==
Chantiers Amel has produced a variety of sloops and ketches for blue water cruising and for day sailing. For many years, Chantiers Amel was known for its practice of only producing a single model at a time. Since around 2010, the company has been producing two models at a time; currently the Amel 50 and Amel 60. Both are sloops with optional solent rig staysails, designed by Jean Berret & Olivier Racoupeau.

Models
| Model | Rig | Length, metres | From | To | Designer(s) |
|---|---|---|---|---|---|
| Super Mistral Sport | Sloop | 7.06 | 1961 | 1972 | Henri Amel |
| Alisio | Sloop | 9.40 | 1962 | 1966 | Henri Amel |
| Copain | Sloop | 5.25 | 1962 | 1968 | Henri Amel |
| Pampero | | 5.74 | 1963 | 1968 | Henri Amel |
| Euros 39 | Ketch | 11.75 | 1966 | 1972 | Henri Amel |
| Garbi | Sloop | 6 | 1971 | 1972 | Henri Amel |
| Maramu | Ketch | 13.80 | 1978 | 1989 | Henri Amel |
| Mango | Ketch | 15.82 | 1979 | 1989 | Henri Amel |
| Sharki | Ketch | 11.95 | 1979 | 1989 | Henri Amel |
| Fango | Sloop | 10 | 1985 | 1991 | Henri Amel |
| Santorin | Sloop | 14 | 1989 | 1997 | Henri Amel |
| Super Maramu | Ketch | 16 | 1988 | 1998 | Henri Amel |
| Super Maramu 2000 | Ketch | 16 | 1998 | 2006 | Henri Amel |
| Amel 54 | Ketch | 17.20 | 2005 | 2011 | Henri Amel |
| Amel 64 | Ketch | 19.60 | 2010 | 2019 | Jean Berret & Olivier Racoupeau |
| Amel 55 | Ketch | 17.30 | 2011 | 2018 | Jean Berret & Olivier Racoupeau |
| Amel 50 | Sloop/Solent | 15.51 | 2017 | Ongoing | Jean Berret & Olivier Racoupeau |
| Amel 60 | Sloop/Solent | 18 | 2019 | Ongoing | Jean Berret & Olivier Racoupeau |
