= Bahruz Maharramov =

Azerbaijani lawyer and politician

Bahruz Maharramov Member of the National Assembly of Azerbaijan

Member of the Azerbaijan Parliament for Bilasuvar District
- Incumbent
- Assumed office 10 March 2020
- Preceded by: new constituency

Personal details
- Born: 22 August 1983 (age 43) Agabagy, Zardab District, Azerbaijan
- Party: Independent
- Education: Baku State University
- Occupation: Journalism, Law
- Profession: School of Law
- Committees: Legal Policies and State Structuring Committee

Bahruz Abdurrahman oglu Maharramov (Azerbaijani: Bəhruz Abdurrəhman oğlu Məhərrəmov; born 22 August 1983) is an Azerbaijani lawyer and politician who is a Member of the National Assembly of Azerbaijan (VI convocation), and Member of the Azerbaijani Bar Association.

== Early life and education ==
Bahruz Maharramov was born on August 22, 1983, in Agabagy, Zardab District. He received his primary education in Agabagy and Kandabil. Then he moved to Baku where he finished secondary school #194, and also Zangilan high school #24 which was located in the capital after the capture of Zangilan District by the Armenian Armed Forces.

In 2004, Maharramov graduated from Baku State University Faculty of Journalism.

From 2004 to 2005, he served in the US Marine Corps in the Republic of Iraq as part of the Azerbaijani peacekeeping forces.

== Career ==
Since 2012, Maharramov has been doing scientific and pedagogical activity at the law faculty of BSU. He is the author of 3 books, 7 syllabi and more than 30 scientific articles. He is also an associate professor at the UNESCO Department of Human Rights and Information Law at Baku State University.

He is a Member of the National Assembly of Azerbaijan (VI convocation) for Bilasuvar District #66.
