= Alimullah =

Alimullah (Bengali: আলীমুল্লাহ্), a Bengali masculine given name of Arabic origin, may refer to:

- Khwaja Alimullah (1772–1854), first Nawab of Dhaka
- M Alimullah Miyan (1942–2017), founder of the International University of Business Agriculture and Technology

== See also ==
- A. K. M. Alim Ullah (born 1955), Bangladeshi politician
