= Alimuddin Daeng Matiro =

2nd Regent of Poso, Indonesia

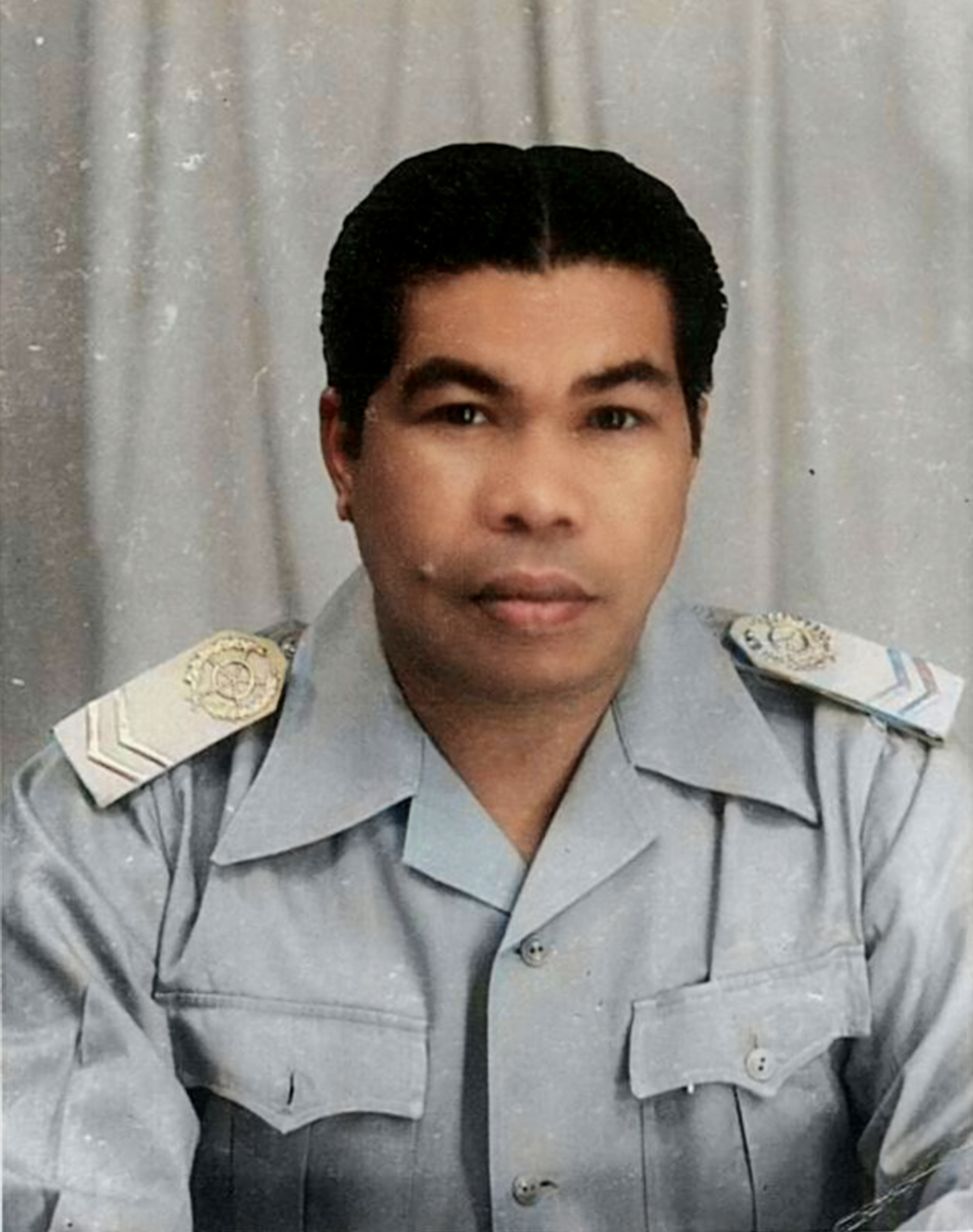

Regent of Poso
- In office 1954–1956
- President: Sukarno
- Preceded by: Abdul Latif Daeng Masikki
- Succeeded by: Djafar Lapasere

Alimuddin Daeng Matiro was the second regent of Poso Regency, Central Sulawesi, Indonesia; who ruled from 1954 to 1956. As well as the first regent of Poso, Abdul Latif Daeng Masikki, he also came from the military.

He was also one of the 51 people who declared Permesta, a rebel movement fighting against the Indonesian central government, along with Ventje Sumual and Alexander Evert Kawilarang.
