= Malik Maharramov =

Soviet Azerbaijani army colonel and politician (1920–2004)

Colonel Malik Malik oglu Maharramov
- Məlik Məlik oğlu Məhərrəmov
- Born: 29 August 1920; Bıçaqçı, Azerbaijan SSR
- Died: 16 July 2004 (aged 83); Baku, Azerbaijan
- Military career
- Allegiance: Soviet Union
- Branch: Soviet Army
- Service years: 1939–1973
- Rank: Colonel
- Unit: 77th Guards Rifle Division
- Conflicts: World War II; Battle of the Dnieper; Operation Bagration; Vistula-Oder Offensive; Berlin Offensive
- Awards: Hero of the Soviet Union

Malik Malik oglu Maharramov (Azerbaijani: Məlik Məlik oğlu Məhərrəmov; 29 August 1920–16 July 2004) was an Azerbaijani Soviet Army Colonel and a Hero of the Soviet Union. Maharramov was awarded the title on 15 January 1944 for his leadership of a company during the Battle of the Dnieper. He served in the army postwar and became the military commissar for several districts in the Azerbaijan Soviet Socialist Republic. After graduating from Frunze Military Academy, Maharramov became a regimental chief of staff in 1954. He retired in 1973 with the rank of colonel. After his retirement from the army, he held several positions in the Azerbaijan Communist Party and was secretary of the Baku State University party organization.

== Early life ==
Maharramov was born on 29 August 1920 in Bıçaqçı to a peasant family.He worked on the kolkhoz from the age of 10 . In 1936 he graduated from secondary school and entered the Baku Technical College of Economic Accounting, from which Maharramov graduated with honors in 1939. He was drafted into the Red Army in October 1939. In 1940, he graduated from the Red Army Central School of Communications.

== World War II ==
Maharramov fought in World War II from June 1941. He fought with the 70th Rifle Division near Novgorod, leading a communications squad. Maharramov was seriously wounded in July and was evacuated to a hospital in Yaroslavl and then Solikamsk. He recovered and was sent back to the front, fighting on the Northwestern Front. Maharramov was wounded and after his recovery sent to the Vladimir Infantry School, from which he graduated in 1942 with the rank of lieutenant. Maharramov was appointed leader of a cadet platoon at the Ryazan Infantry School.

Maharramov returned to combat. He became a company commander in the 218th Guards Rifle Regiment of the 77th Guards Rifle Division and fought in the Battle of the Dnieper. On 17 September Maharramov's company was reportedly among the first to reach Mena, 70 kilometers east of Chernigov, clearing several streets of German troops. Between 20 and 21 September the company helped captured Chernigov. The regiment reached the Dnieper on 26 September. On the night of 27 September, Maharramov led his company across the Dnieper near the village of Nedanchichi, advanced into the German trenches, and reportedly seized a bridgehead. The company reportedly held the bridgehead until the rest of the regiment arrived. On 15 January 1944 Maharramov was awarded the title Hero of the Soviet Union and the Order of Lenin.

In February 1944, Maharramov was sent to the Kremlin to receive his Gold Star from Mikhail Kalinin. He became commander of a cadet company at the Ryazan Machine Gun School, where he was promoted to captain. Maharramov was transferred back to the 77th Guards Rifle Division in June 1944 and became a deputy battalion commander and later commander. Maharramov fought in Operation Bagration. Between 18 and 21 July the division crossed the Western Bug and entered Poland. During the battle for Chełm, Maharramov reportedly helped the battalion commander lead units. On 24 July while crossing the Wieprz, the battalion commander was wounded and Maharramov took command. The battalion reportedly crossed the river and pushed back German troops. On the night of 31 July to 1 August, during the Vistula crossing, Maharramov crossed the river first while leading a small detachment and reportedly displaced German troops from positions. For his reported actions, Maharramov was awarded the Order of Kutuzov 3rd class on 12 September.

For his actions during battles on the Oder, Maharramov received the Order of the Patriotic War 1st class on 12 June. In March 1945, near Berlin, Maharramov was wounded and evacuated to a hospital in Kharkov.

== Postwar ==
After the end of the war, Maharramov continued to serve in the army. In 1946 he became military commissar of the Khizi District. In 1950 Maharramov became the military commissar of Suraxanı raion. He studied at the Frunze Military Academy and graduated in 1954. Maharramov became chief of staff of the 68th Rifle Regiment in the 216th Rifle Division. Between 1956 and 1958 he was military commissar of the Agdash District. In January 1958, Maharramov became head of studies of the Azerbaijan State University military department. Between March 1961 and 1965 he was military commissar of Sabirabad District, Kurdamir District, and Nərimanov raion. Between 1965 and 1973 he was head of the Azerbaijan State University military department. Maharramov retired in 1973 with the rank of colonel.

Maharramov was repeatedly elected a delegate to the congress of the Azerbaijan Communist Party and was a deputy of the District Council of the Baku City Executive Committee. Between 1985 and 1990 he was secretary of the Baku University party organization. On 6 April 1985 he was awarded a second Order of the Patriotic War 1st class on the 40th anniversary of the end of World War II. In 1995, Maharramov was elected an honorary member of the Society of Scientists. He lived in Baku and worked as the head of the 1st Department of Baku State University and was a member of the Academic Council. Maharramov died on 16 July 2004 and was buried in the Alley of Honor.
