= Emel Vardar =

Turkish sculptor and painter

- Education: Mimar Sinan Fine Arts University
- Style: Female spirit
- Awards: Bronze sculptures Individual Disarmament and Peace
- Website: emelvardar.com

Emel Vardar is a Turkish sculptor and painter.

== Biography ==
Vardar studied in the Faculty of Painting and Sculpture at the Mimar Sinan Fine Arts University and at the Sculpture Museums Society Studios. She painted many sea scenes and one of her paintings was taken by the Turkish Naval Forces headquarters. She held several personal exhibitions and participated in many art festivals and fairs in other countries including the United States, China, Monaco and the United Kingdom. More recently she has worked mainly on sculpture especially following her opening a sculpture gallery. In 1993, Vardar opened the Eylul Art Gallery. In 2004 she opened the Emel Vardar Art Gallery for exclusively sculpture exhibitions.

== Sculpture ==
Vardar's main sculpture style include female figures and busts. She uses various materials, including bronze, glass and steel, and techniques. In her female sculptures she wants to express the strength of the female while still representing a beautiful and naive female figure. She has said that she is after beauty in her sculptures. She wants to represent the inner beauty of a woman with different techniques alongside representing her outer beauty. She has described her sculptures as the solidification of her thoughts and feelings in the enchanting magic of glass and crystal. She has a crystal sculpture which is part of the permanent exhibit of the Museum of Contemporaneous Glass Artworks. Some of her other works are part of private collections.

== Recognitions ==
She won the Bronze sculptures Individual Disarmament and Peace award. Her sculptures have also been documented in art journals and Turkish newspapers.

== Exhibitions ==
Vardar has had many exhibitions. In 2017 she has had two exhibitions in the United States, an exhibition in France and two exhibitions in both Spain, Italy and also two in her native Turkey.
