= Ağabağı =

- Municipality
- Location within Azerbaijan
- Coordinates: 40°06′38″N 47°48′47″E
- Country: Azerbaijan
- Rayon: Zardab

Area
  - Total: 7.99 km^{2} (3.08 sq mi)

Population (2015)
  - Total: 480
  - Density: 60/km^{2} (160/sq mi)
- Time zone: UTC+4 (AZT)
  - Summer (DST): UTC+5 (AZT)

Ağabağı (also, Agabagy) is a village and municipality in the Zardab Rayon of Azerbaijan. It has a population of 442.
