= Adidja Alim =

Cameroonian politician

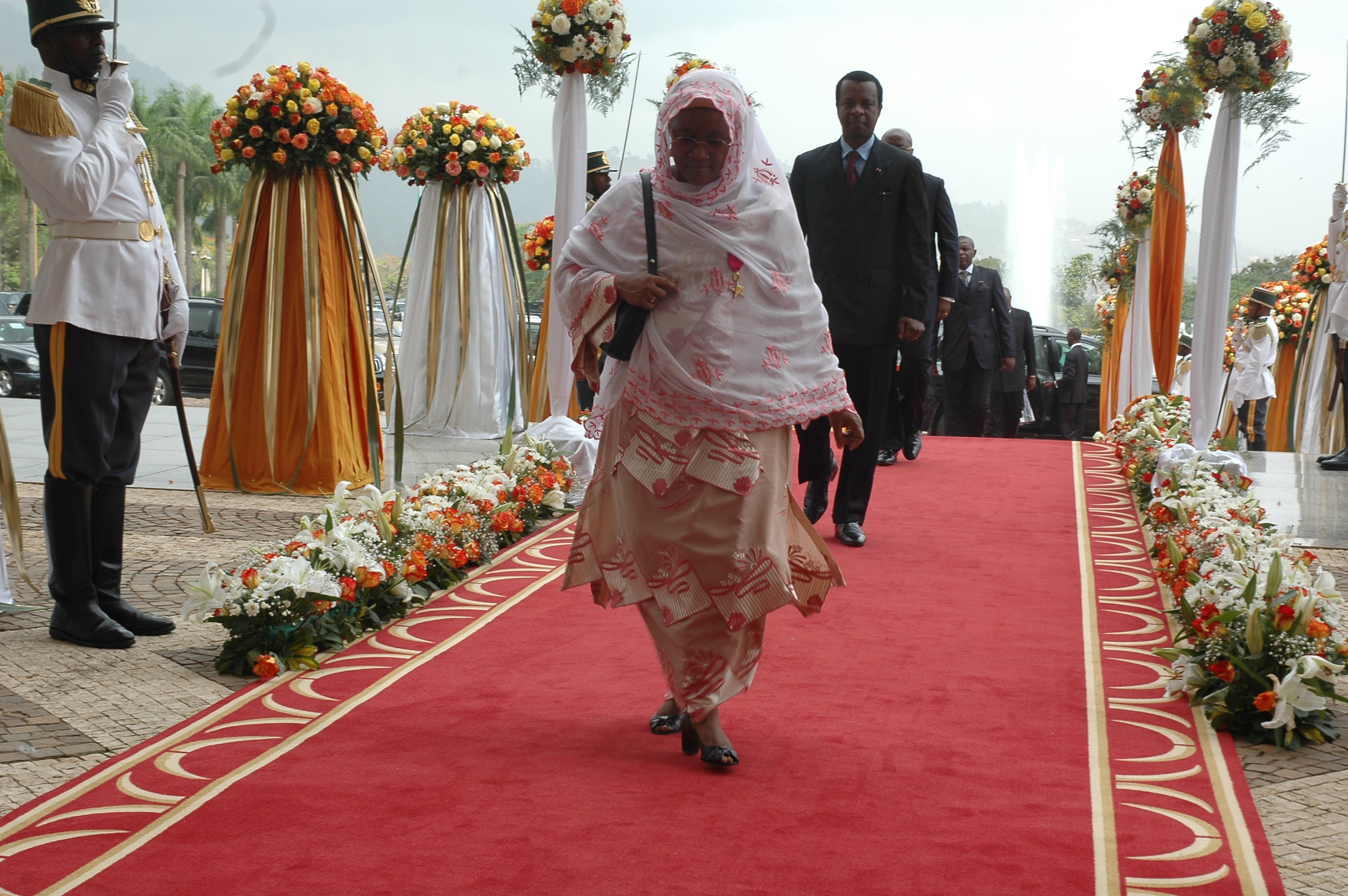
- Adidja Alim during the presentation of wishes to the president, in 2012.
- Born: 1956 (age 69–70); Benoue
- Citizenship: Cameroon
- Occupation: Politician
- Political party: Cameroon People's Democratic Movement

Youssouf née Adidja Alim is a Cameroonian politician. Since 2009, she has been the Minister of Basic Education.

== Biography ==
She was born in 1956 in the Bénoué division, in the North region of Cameroon.

=== Education ===
She is a graduate from the National School of Administration and Magistracy (ENAM) with a specialty as inspector of social affairs.

=== Career ===
She began her professional career at the Maternity Department of the Garoua Hospital. She later became director of Garoua's House of Women

=== Politics ===
==== Deputation ====
She is a member of the Cameroonian People's Democratic Movement (CPDM). The CPDM is the majority political party in Cameroon. She became a member of the National Assembly of Cameroon, Cameroon's parliament, for the constituency from the Benoue division.

==== Ministerial mandate ====
During the cabinet reshuffle of June 30, 2009, she became the Minister of Basic Education.

== Distinctions ==
On October 24, 2015, she received the Kirei-Na Gakko Award of Excellence, awarded by the Japan International Cooperation Agency (JICA) for "Best Practices" for the maintenance and upkeep of schools in Japan. Japanese donation project in Cameroon. Cameroon is the third African country to receive this distinction after Tunisia in 2010 and Malawi in 2013.

=== Other projects ===
- Media related to Adidja Alim at Wikimedia Commons
