= EMEL Fashion =

American fashion house

EMEL Fashion Logo

EMEL Fashion was an American fashion design house that was based in Los Angeles, California. The company's name comes from the letters "M" and "L", which stand for "Michelle Liu", the Taiwanese born chief designer and co-founder of EMEL Fashion.

According to its Facebook fan page, EMEL Fashion specializes in contemporary lady's fashion apparels and distinguishes itself from other fashion houses by using proprietary economic models designed by Ken Wu, the managing director and co-founder, to aid its style and design research.

== History ==
EMEL Fashion was founded in 2008 by Michelle Liu and Ken Wu. Michelle Liu had previously only been moderately known by her name in Los Angeles for her participation in Fashion Career International fashion shows. Alison A. Nieder, executive editor of California Apparel News, commented that Michelle Liu "went romantic for her collection, which paired reflective silks with diaphanous chiffons in an Easter-egg pastel palette" for her very first FCI fashion show collection. Later Michelle Liu also designed a collection that included youthful cocktail dresses for her second collection. And finally, Michelle Liu and her EMEL Fashion had a break-out at a major west coast fashion event Project Ethos: Incubator with her latest collection—Urban Dryad, "a collection rich with eco-friendly and body hugging knit fabrics."
