= Obaidullah Aleem =

Pakistani poet (1939–1998)

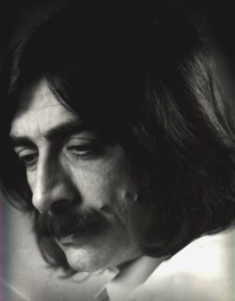
- Born: June 12, 1939; Bhopal, British India
- Died: May 18, 1998 (aged 58); Karachi, Pakistan
- Occupation: Pakistani poet of Urdu language
- Writing career
- Language: Urdu
- Notable works: Chand chehra sitara ankhhen (1974), Viran saray ka diya (1986), Yei Zindagi Hey Hamari (Selected Poems), Mein Khhuli Huwi Ik Sachai (Collected Prose), Chiragh Jaltey Hain: The Unpublished Poetry of Obaidullah Aleem (Facsimile edition edited by Rehan Qayoom, 2014)
- Notable awards: Adamji Prize

Obaidullah Aleem (Urdu: عبیدالله علیم, 12 June 1939 – 18 May 1998) was a Pakistani poet of Urdu language.

== Life ==
Aleem was born in 1939 in Bhopal, British India. He received an MA in Urdu from the University of Karachi and began working as a radio and television producer until 1967.

In 1974, his first book of poetry Chand Chehra Sitara Ankhhen was published. He was a senior producer at the Karachi station of Pakistan Television Corporation until he was forced to resign in 1978 following an edict against him.

His book of poetry received the highest award in literature in Pakistan, the Adamji Prize. He wrote an article, Khurshid missal shakhs, in memory of Khalifatul Masih III in 1982. His second collection of poetry Viran saray ka diya was published in 1986.

In March 1998 he suffered a severe heart attack in Punjab and was hospitalized for a few days. He returned to his residence at Nazimabad in Karachi. He died from heart failure, following another heart attack on 18 May 1998.

== Bibliography ==
- Chand chehra sitara ankhhen, (1974)
- Viran saray ka diya, (1986)
- Yei Zindagi Hey Hamari, (Selected poems)
- Mein Khhuli Huwi Ik Sachai, (Collected prose)
- Chiragh Jaltey Hain: The Unpublished Poetry of Obaidullah Aleem, (Facsimile edition edited by Rehan Qayoom, 2014)
