= Amil (Galicia) =

- Parish
- San Mamede de Amil
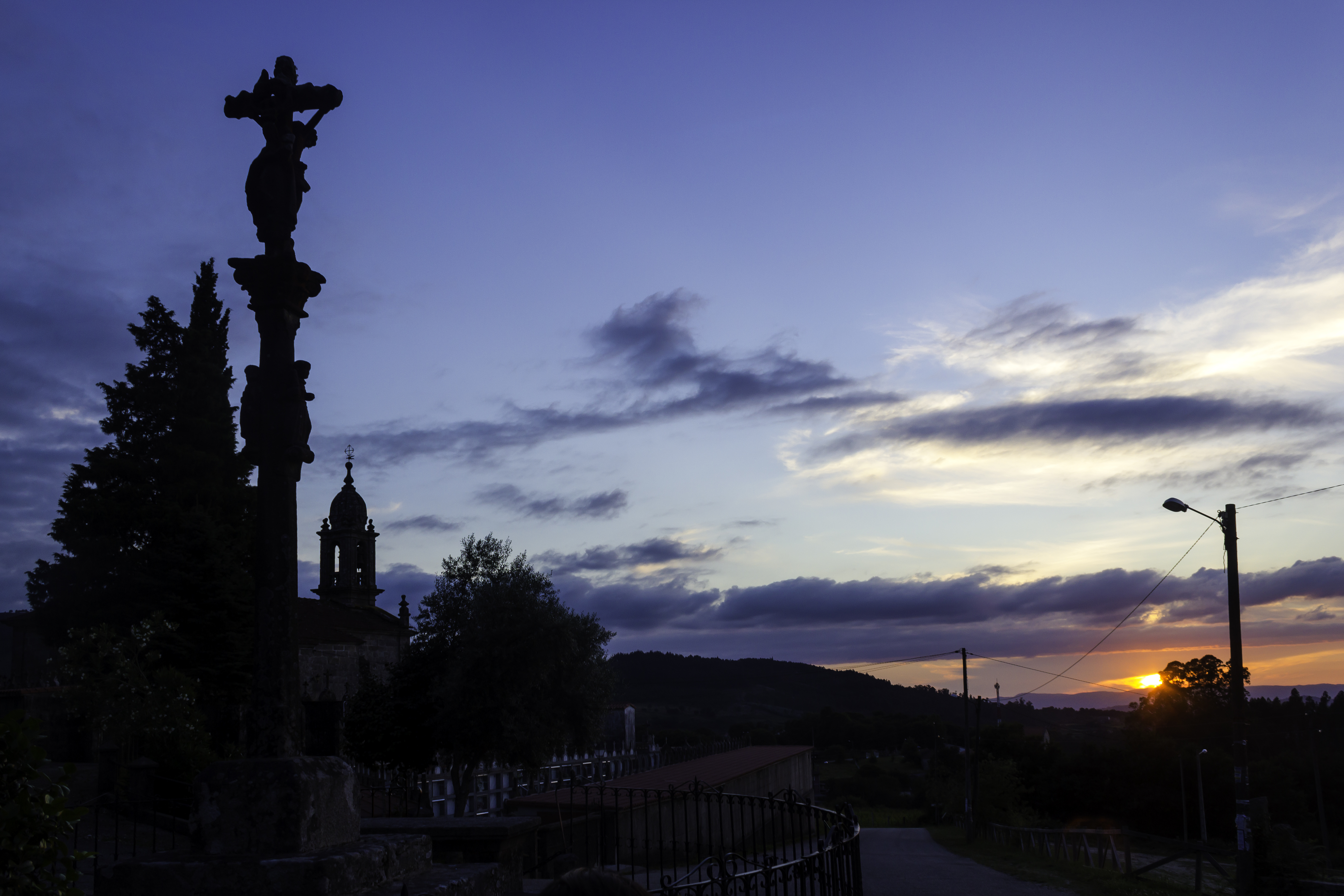
- Sunset in Amil

- Location within Galicia
- Coordinates: 42°32′25.001″N 8°35′1.000″W
- Country: Spain
- Autonomous community: Galicia
- Province: Pontevedra
- Minicipality: Moraña
- Places: 14
- Time zone: UTC+1 (CET)
  - Summer (DST): UTC+2 (CET)

Amil, also known as San Mamede de Amil (literally, Saint Mammes of Amil) is a parish located in the municipality of Moraña, in Galicia. According to the municipal register of 2004, it had 472 inhabitants (253 women and 219 men), distributed across 16 population entities, representing a decrease compared to 1999 when it had 522 inhabitants. According to the Galician Institute of Statistics (IGE), in 2014 its population had fallen to 414 inhabitants, with 197 men and 217 women.

== Etymology ==
The toponym Amil derives from the genitive case of a property owner's name of Germanic origin. In other words, it comes from the name of an ancient landowner called Alamirus, a Latinized form composed of the Gothic elements alls (all, very) e mereis (celebrated, famous).

The Galician toponym Amil, in turn, also became an anthroponym. As a given name, it was originally used as a masculine name, but due to the Marian devotion it is now much more commonly seen as a feminine name. As a surname, there are about 1000 people with the surname Amil in Galicia.

== Historical and artistic heritage ==
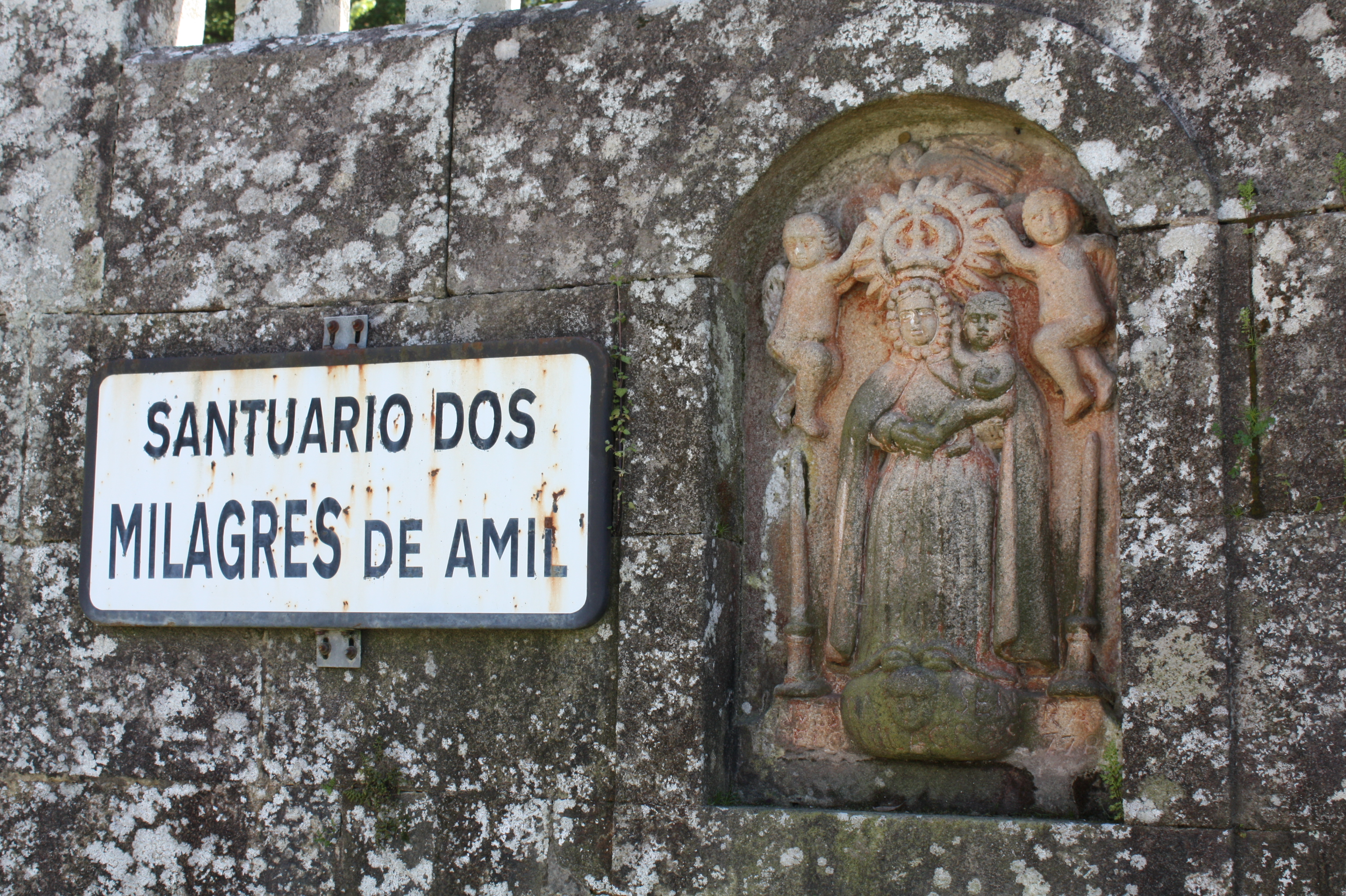
Santuário dos Milagres de Amil (Sanctuary of the Miracles of Amil)

The parish church was built in 1781.

In 1892, the construction of the Santuário da Virxe dos Milagres de Amil (Sanctuary of the Virgin of Miracles of Amil) was completed. On the first Sunday after 8 September, the Pilgrimage of the Miracles of Amil is celebrated here, attended by thousands of pilgrims from all over Galicia.

Popular tradition holds that it all began with a miracle that occurred in the 18th century. There was a farmer named Sebastián, who had to travel a long path to a distant well to fetch the necessary water to irrigate his garden and give drink to his livestock, so he prayed devoutly to the Virgin. One day, after praying for help, he began to dig in the earth and miraculously a spring began to flow. The water was so abundant that it even allowed him to build a mill powered by this spring.

Hence the popular song:

"Miña Virxe dos Milagres / que fas milagres na terra, / fixeches nace-la auga / na fonte da Rozavella".

Which translates as:

"My Virgin of Miracles, / who works miracles on earth, / you made the water spring forth / at the Rozavella fountain"

Furthermore, the parish has several 18th and 19th-century wayside crosses.

=== The Virgin of Miracles in Galician popular culture ===
- Miña Virxe dos Milagres, / os milagres vanse vendo, / âs rapaciñas de agora / vaille a barriga crecendo

(Translation: My Virgin of Miracles, / miracles are there to be seen, / the young girls of today / have their bellies swelling)

- Miña Virxe dos Milagres / vive no alto da Chan, / para ver os mariñeiros / como vogan polo mar.

(Translation: My Virgin of Miracles / lives high up on A Chan, / to see the sailors / as they row across the sea)

== Festivals ==
Since 1970, the gastronomic festival Festa do porquiño á brasa de Amil (Amil's grilled piglet festival) has been celebrated in this parish.

== Image gallery ==
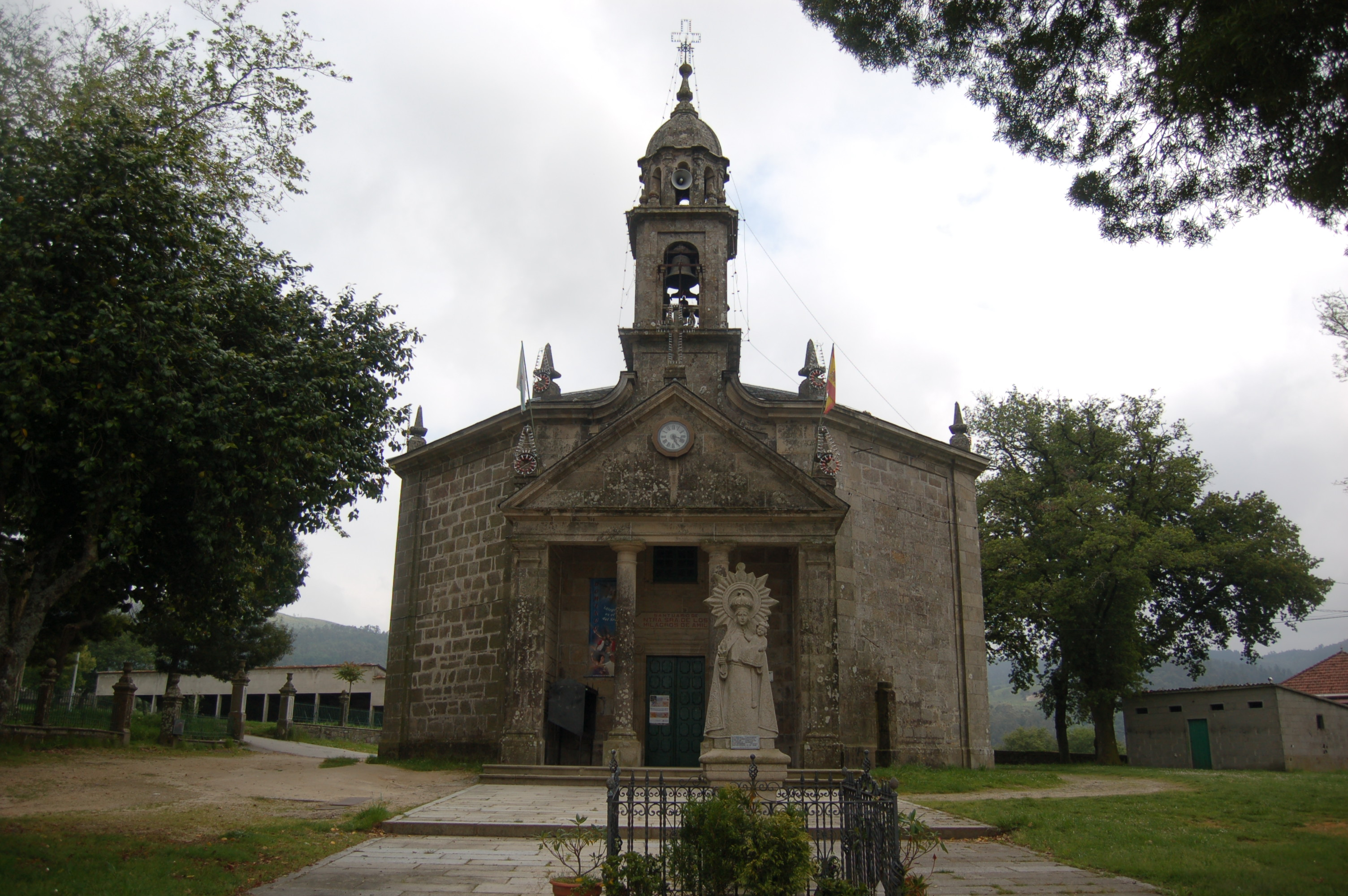
Sanctuary of the Virgin of Miracles.

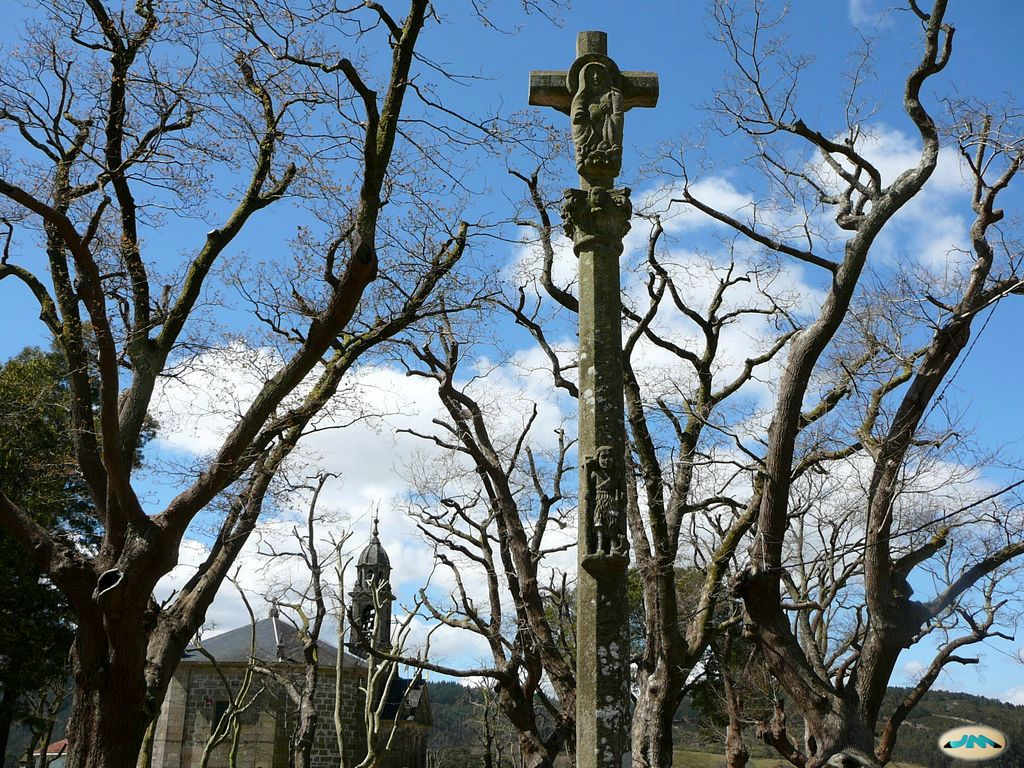
Sanctuary of the Virgin of Miracles.

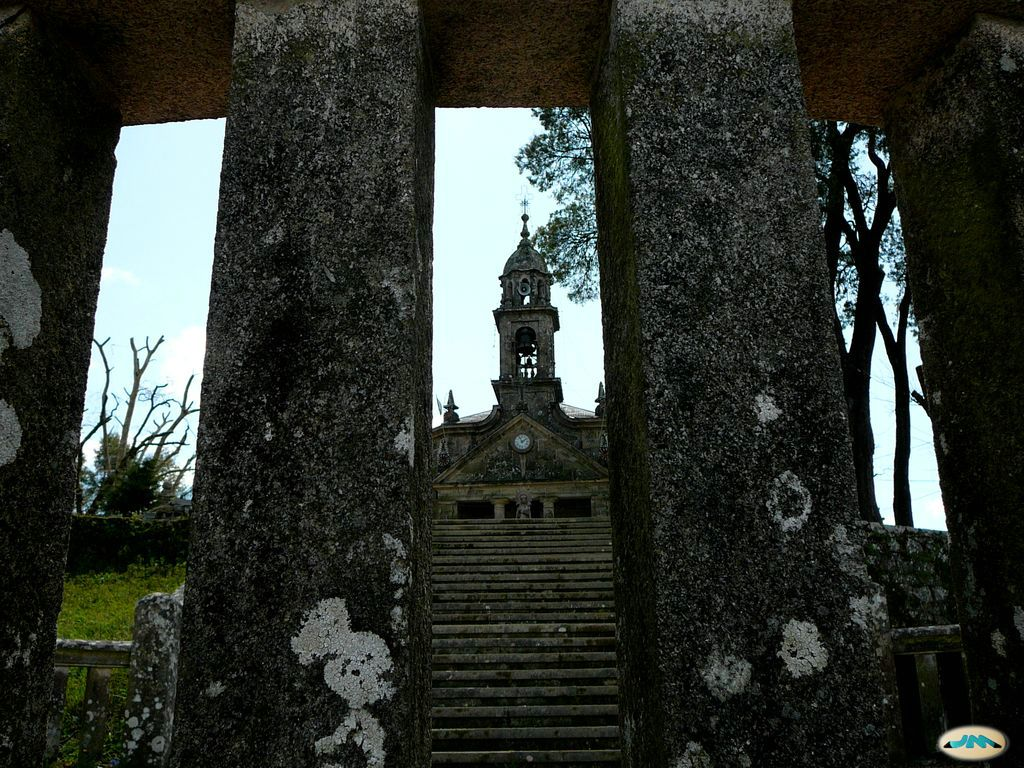
Sanctuary of the Virgin of Miracles.

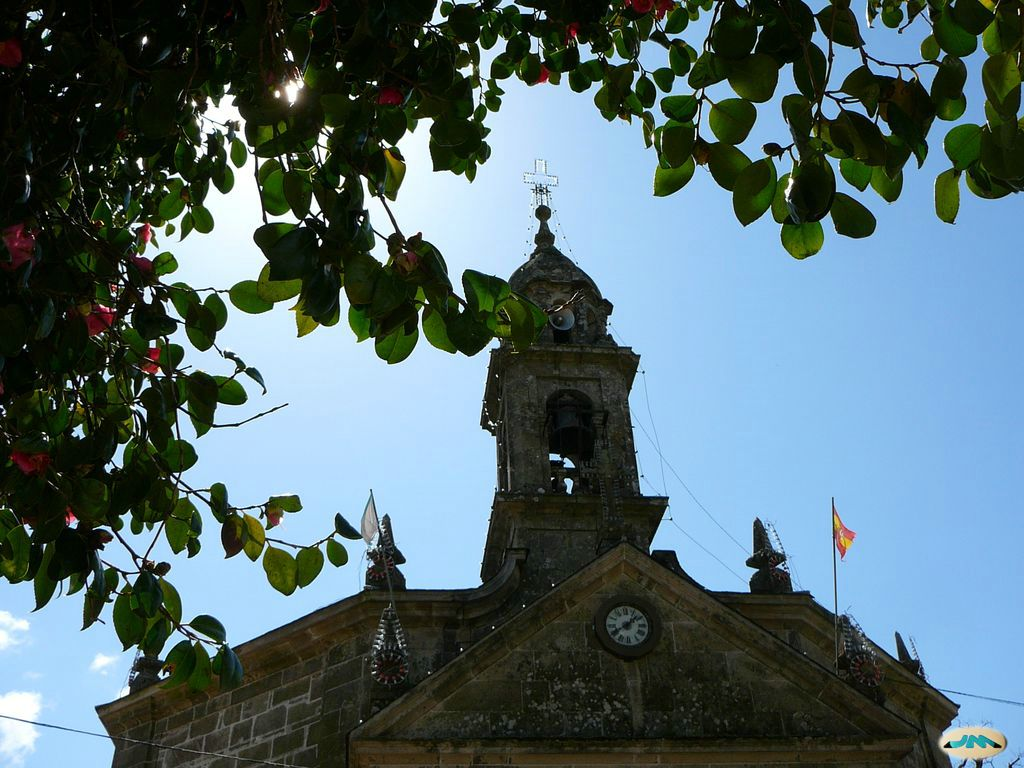
Sanctuary of the Virgin of Miracles.

== See also ==
- Moraña

== Bibliography ==
- BOUZA BREY, Fermín: "Cantigas populares da Arousa", in Arquivos do Seminario de Estudos Galegos III, 1929, 153–204.
- VAQUEIRO, Vítor: Mitoloxía de Galiza. Lendas, tradicións, maxias, santos e milagres, ed. Galaxia, Vigo 2011.
