= Amil Mammedali oglu Maharramov =

Azerbaijani economist

Amil Maharramov Amil Məhərrəmov

Personal details
- Born: December 24, 1974 (age 51) Baku, Azerbaijan SSR, Soviet Union

Military service
- Branch/service: Economic

Amil Mammedali oglu Maharramov (Azerbaijani: Amil Məmmədəli oğlu Məhərrəmov; born December 24, 1974, in Azerbaijan) is an Azerbaijani economist and professor.

== Early life and education ==
Maharramov Amil Mammedalioglu was born on 24 December 1974 in Baku (Azerbaijani Republic). In 1991, he finished school No. 54 in Baku.

In 1991-1996 he graduated from Baku State University faculty “Social sciences and psychology”, specialty “Economic theory” with honors. In 1996-2000 he graduated from post-graduate course at Baku State University by majoring in economic theory.

== Career ==
He started work in December 1995 as a chief technician in the Institute of Economy in the Azerbaijan National Academia of Sciences. In 1999, he served as lecturer at the Baku State University. From 1999 to 2006 he was a lecturer, senior lecturer, docent in the Department of International Economic Relations and Management. From the 2002 he worked as deputy dean for international relations and international law. Since 2006 he has been a docent and the head of the department of Organization of Customs Business and management. Since 2015 he has been professor of this department.

Maharramov is the author of 190 scientific studies, including 5 monographs, 20 training programs, 1 manual, 1 tutorial and 10 textbooks. About 40 scientific articles was published in the materials of international conferences, symposia and congresses.

His main topics of scientific researches are foreign economic activity, new economic problems, and problems of the Development of Education.

== Publications ==
=== Monographs ===
- Theoretical and practical problems of formation and progress of custom policy (in Azerbaijan Republic's practice). Monograph, Baku, 2009
- Entrepreneurship: from theory to practice. Monograph, Baku, 2009
- Foreign economic relations of Azerbaijan: achievements and perspectives. Monograph, Baku, 2015
- Modern bank system and banking Monograph, Baku, 2015
- Social defence and its role in the formation human capital. Monograph, Baku, 2018
- Baku State University and economic science in Azerbaijan. Monograph, Baku, 2019

=== Books ===
- Regulation of foreign economic activity. Textbook, Baku, 2008
- Economic diplomacy. Textbook, Baku, 2009
- Azerbaijan economy. Textbook, Baku, 2011
- Business economics. Textbook, Baku, 2013
- Economic diplomacy (2nd edition). Textbook, Baku, 2013
- Economy of firms. Textbook, Baku, 2019
- Banking.Textbook, Baku, 2019
- Economics. Textbook, Baku, 2019
- Introduction to the economy. Textbook, Baku, 2019
- Economic diplomacy (3rd edition). Textbook, Baku, 2020

== As editor ==
- Co-editor of the “International law and integration problems” magazine.
- Chairman of the editorial board of the journal "Economic and Political Science"
- “The Great Economical Encyclopedia” in 7 parts. Baku, “East-West” publishing house, 2012–2015. Deputy Chief Editor.
- Member of editorial board of the “Tafakkur” University magazine. The center of science and education “Tafakkur” .
- Member of the editorial board of the scientific magazine “Cooperation” of the University of Cooperation of the Azerbaijan.
- Member of the editorial board of “Humanities and Social Science Research” in USA
