= Dolní Morava =

- Municipality
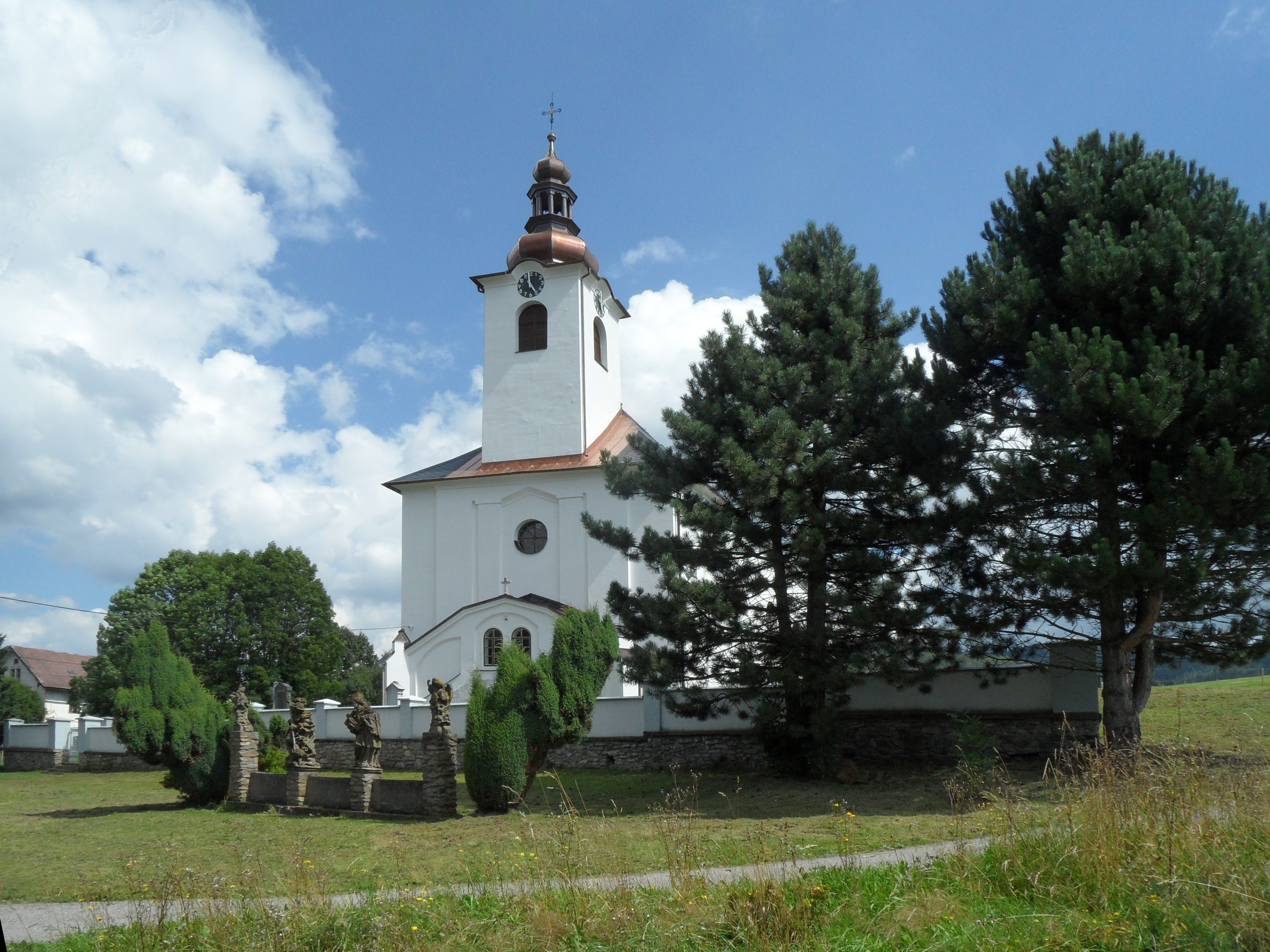
- Church of Saint Aloysius Gonzaga

- Flag Coat of arms

- Location in the Czech Republic
- Coordinates: 50°7′21″N 16°47′58″E
- Country: Czech Republic
- Region: Pardubice
- District: Ústí nad Orlicí
- First mentioned: 1577

Area
  - Total: 36.57 km^{2} (14.12 sq mi)
- Elevation: 615 m (2,018 ft)

Population (2026-01-01)
  - Total: 457
  - Density: 12.5/km^{2} (32.4/sq mi)
- Time zone: UTC+1 (CET)
  - Summer (DST): UTC+2 (CEST)
- Postal code: 561 69
- Website: www.obecdolnimorava.cz

Dolní Morava (German: Mohrau) is a municipality and village in Ústí nad Orlicí District in the Pardubice Region of the Czech Republic. It has about 500 inhabitants.

== Administrative division ==
Dolní Morava consists of three municipal parts (in brackets population according to the 2021 census):

- Dolní Morava (94)
- Horní Morava (20)
- Velká Morava (258)

== Etymology ==
The name Morava is derived from the Morava River. Dolní Morava means 'lower Morava'.

== Geography ==
Dolní Morava is located about 32 kilometres (20 mi) northeast of Ústí nad Orlicí and 72 km (45 mi) east of Pardubice, on the border with Poland. Most of the municipality lies in the Králický Sněžník Mountains. The highest mountain of the range and one of the highest in the country, Králický Sněžník at 1,423 m (4,669 ft) above sea level, is situated in the northern part of the municipality on the Czech–Polish border. Klepáč, a mountain which is a triple point of the European watershed, is also located in the municipality on the Czech–Polish border.

The Morava River originates on Králický Sněžník. It flows across the municipality and forms here the historic boundary between Bohemia and Moravia.

== History ==
The area around the Morava River was settled during the second half of the 16th century. The first written mention of Morava is from 1577. Velká Morava was first mentioned in 1564. Before 1720, Morava was split into two separate villages of Dolní Morava and Horní Morava, administered as parts of the Králíky estate. In 1850, the villages became three independent municipalities.

Historically, the territory was inhabited mainly by ethnic Germans. After World War II, the German-speaking population was expelled and partially replaced by Czech settlers. In 1960, Dolní Morava, Horní Morava and Velká Morava were merged into one municipality.

== Demographics ==
Historical population

Year	Pop.	±%
1869	1,041	—
1880	1,071	+2.9%
1890	1,048	−2.1%
1900	920	−12.2%
1910	796	−13.5%

Year	Pop.	±%
1921	714	−10.3%
1930	728	+2.0%
1950	439	−39.7%
1961	358	−18.5%
1970	362	+1.1%

Year	Pop.	±%
1980	322	−11.0%
1991	283	−12.1%
2001	300	+6.0%
2011	282	−6.0%
2021	372	+31.9%

Source: Censuses

== Transport ==
There are no railways or major roads passing through the municipality.

== Sights ==
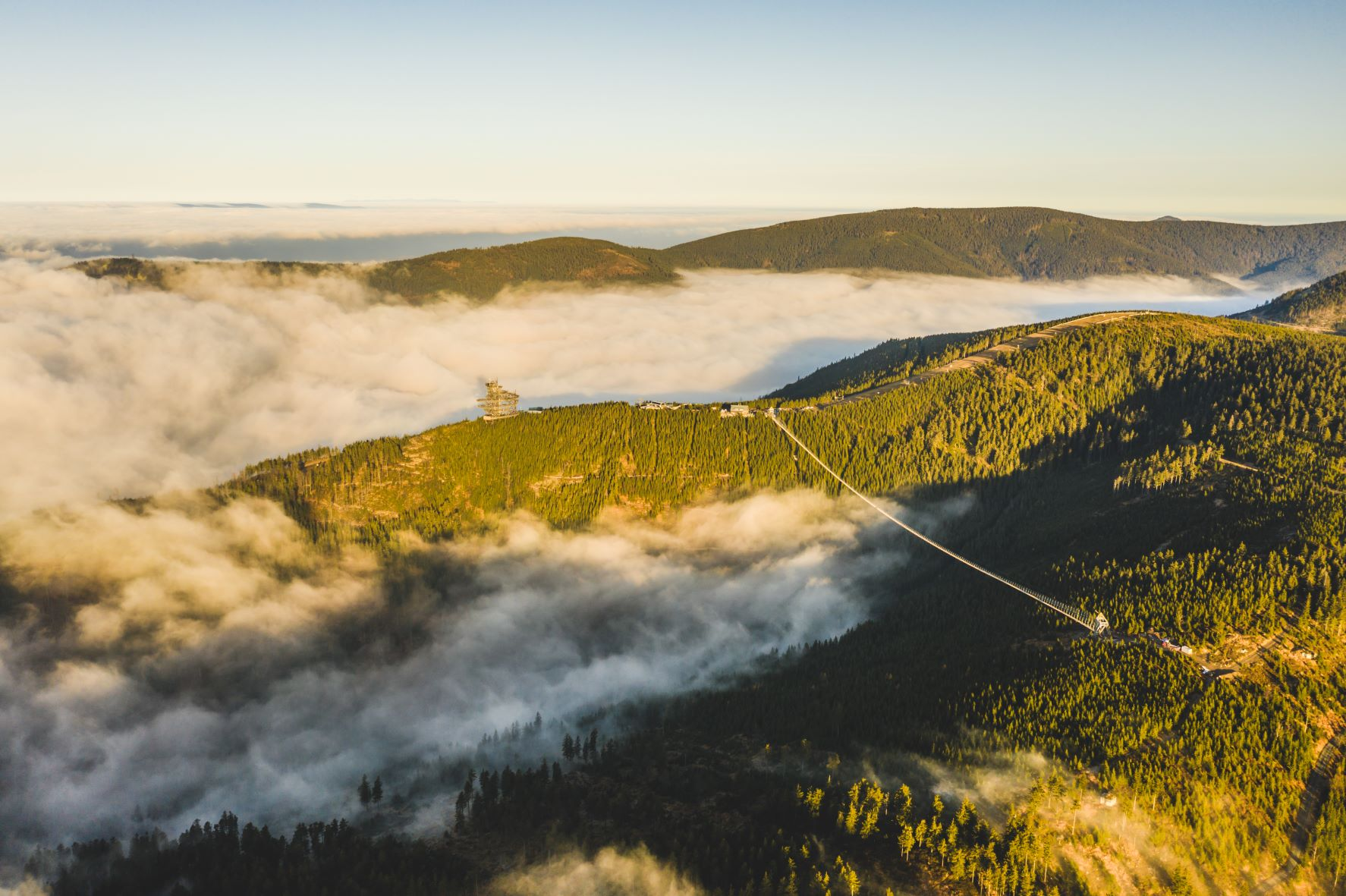
View towards Sky Bridge 721

The main tourist attraction in the municipality is Sky Bridge 721. The 721 metres (2,365 ft) long footbridge, located at an altitude of 1,110 m (3,642 ft) above sea level, was opened to the public in May 2022. Until 2025, it was the longest suspension footbridge in the world.

The Church of Saint Aloysius Gonzaga was built in the Empire style in 1801. The rectory dates from 1802.
