= Sněžník =

Sněžník may refer to:

- Děčínský Sněžník, a mountain in the Czech Republic
- Králický Sněžník, a mountain on the Czech–Polish border
- Králický Sněžník Mountains, a mountain range
