= Pardubice Region =

Region of the Czech Republic

Pardubice Region Pardubický kraj
- Region
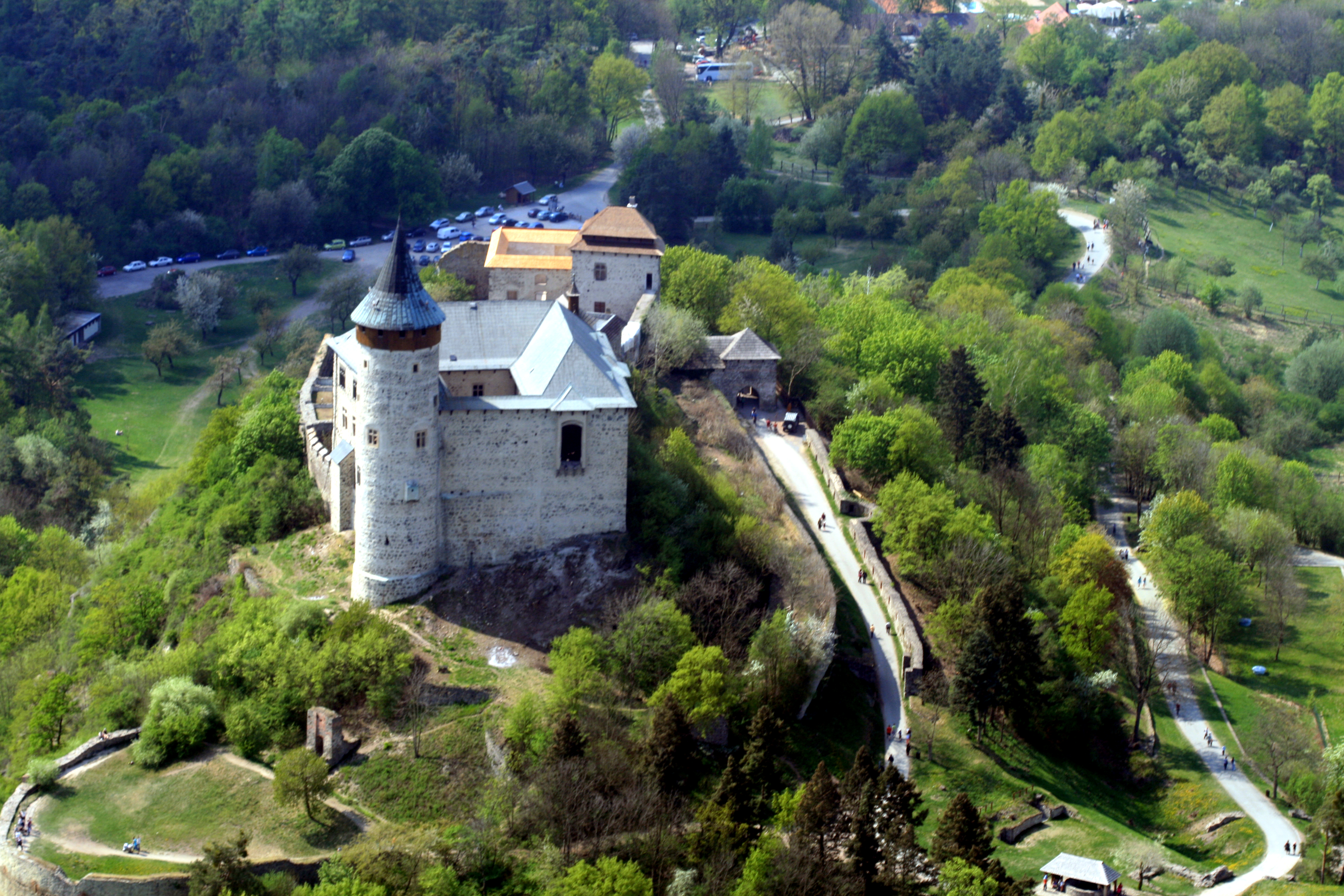
- Kunětická hora from air

- Flag Coat of arms

- Coordinates: 49°52′N 16°10′E
- Country: Czech Republic
- Capital: Pardubice
- Districts: Pardubice District, Chrudim District, Svitavy District, Ústí nad Orlicí District

Government
  - Governor: Martin Netolický (MY)

Area
  - Total: 4,518.63 km^{2} (1,744.65 sq mi)
- Highest elevation: 1,424 m (4,672 ft)

Population (2024-01-01)
  - Total: 530,560
  - Density: 117.42/km^{2} (304.11/sq mi)

GDP
  - Total: CZK 237.131 billion (€9.248 billion)
- ISO 3166 code: CZ-53
- Vehicle registration: E
- Website: www.pardubickykraj.cz

Pardubice Region (Czech: Pardubický kraj) is an administrative unit (Czech: kraj) of the Czech Republic, located mainly in the eastern part of its historical region of Bohemia, with a small part in northwestern Moravia. It is named after its capital Pardubice. As an administrative unit, Pardubice Region has existed three times in the course of history. It was established for the first time in 1850, and extended from Český Brod to the Bohemian-Moravian border. In its second existence, it was one of 19 regions as they were set between 1949 and 1960. After 1960, Pardubice became the capital of Pardubice district, which was part of the Eastern Bohemian Region (capital Hradec Králové). The Pardubice Region, as it is now, was reestablished in 2000.

== Administrative divisions ==
The Pardubice Region is divided into 4 districts:

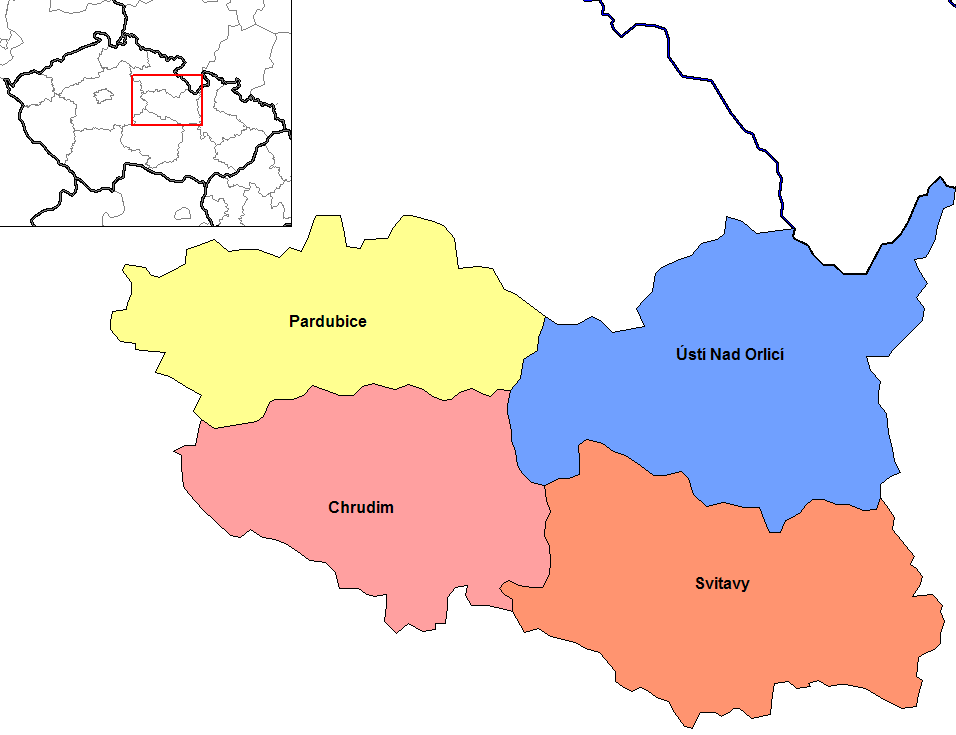
Districts of Pardubice Region

Chrudim; Pardubice	Svitavy; Ústí Nad Orlicí

There are a total of 451 municipalities in the region (as of 2019). Among these are 15 municipalities with extended powers and 26 municipalities with a delegated municipal office. Thirty-two of the municipalities are classified as towns. The regional central offices are in Pardubice.

== Population ==
The total population of the Pardubice Region is about 530,000. 17 municipalities have a higher population than 5,000. The largest municipality of the region is Pardubice with a population of more than 90,000. The table below shows the municipalities in Pardubice Region with the largest population (as of 1 January 2024).

Name	Population	Area (km^{2})	District
Pardubice	92,362	78	Pardubice District
Chrudim	23,441	33	Chrudim District
Svitavy	16,108	31	Svitavy District
Česká Třebová	15,119	41	Ústí nad Orlicí District
Ústí nad Orlicí	14,098	36	Ústí nad Orlicí District
Vysoké Mýto	12,412	42	Ústí nad Orlicí District
Litomyšl	10,493	33	Svitavy District
Lanškroun	9,849	21	Ústí nad Orlicí District
Moravská Třebová	9,715	42	Svitavy District

Other significant towns in Pardubice Region are Hlinsko, Přelouč, Polička, Choceň, Holice, Letohrad and Žamberk.

Historical population

Year	Pop.	±%
1869	486,227	—
1880	508,728	+4.6%
1890	518,094	+1.8%
1900	528,830	+2.1%
1910	551,164	+4.2%

Year	Pop.	±%
1921	531,909	−3.5%
1930	544,849	+2.4%
1950	448,382	−17.7%
1961	483,254	+7.8%
1970	488,766	+1.1%

Year	Pop.	±%
1980	512,573	+4.9%
1991	508,718	−0.8%
2001	508,281	−0.1%
2011	511,627	+0.7%
2021	510,037	−0.3%

Source: Censuses

== Geography ==
With a total size of 4,519 km^{2}, Pardubice is the fifth smallest region in the Czech Republic. Králický Sněžník (1,424 m) is the highest point in the region. The lowest point (201 m) is situated on the water surface of the Elbe River near Kojice.

The southern and southeastern parts of the region are home to the hilly areas of Upper Svratka Highlands and Iron Mountains. The central and western parts of the region are formed by the Polabí lowlands. In the northeast, the region reaches the Orlické Mountains and Hrubý Jeseník range.

The European Watershed runs through the region, where it separates the basins of the North Sea and the Black Sea. The tripoint of the Danube (Black Sea), Elbe (North Sea) and Oder (Baltic Sea) watersheds is located at the peak of Klepáč in Králický Sněžník Mountains. The majority of the region belongs to the drainage basin of the Elbe, consisting of the rivers Chrudimka, Divoká Orlice, Doubrava, Loučná, Tichá Orlice and Třebovka. The rivers in the drainage basin of the Danube are the Morava, Moravská Sázava, Svitava and Třebůvka. The Seč Reservoir (220 ha) and the Pastviny Reservoir (92 ha) are among the larger water bodies in the region.

The most prevalent soil types in the region are podzol and cambisol. Forests cover 29.6% of the region and are predominantly coniferous. Deciduous forests occur around Pardubice.

== Climate ==
Pardubice Region has a continental climate characterized by relatively hot summers and cold winters. The climate in Pardubice Region differs depending on location. The areas in the Polabí lowlands in the western part of the region are relatively warmer with annual mean temperatures reaching 8 °C. On the other hand, the coldest areas are situated in the hilly northeastern part of the region, where the annual mean temperatures are around 4 °C.

Precipitation is relatively lower in the central part of the region where the total annual values are around 700 – 800 mm. In the areas with higher elevation (such as Žďárské Vrchy or the foothills of Orlické Hory) there is higher precipitation with annual values of 800 – 1,000 mm.

Climate data for Pardubice Region (1961–1990)
Month	Jan	Feb	Mar	Apr	May	Jun	Jul	Aug	Sep	Oct	Nov	Dec	Year
Daily mean °C (°F)	−3.1 (26.4)	−1.4 (29.5)	2.2 (36.0)	7.1 (44.8)	12.2 (54.0)	15.3 (59.5)	16.6 (61.9)	16.3 (61.3)	12.7 (54.9)	8.0 (46.4)	2.5 (36.5)	−1.3 (29.7)	7.2 (45.0)
Average precipitation mm (inches)	47 (1.9)	40 (1.6)	42 (1.7)	46 (1.8)	77 (3.0)	87 (3.4)	82 (3.2)	84 (3.3)	56 (2.2)	45 (1.8)	52 (2.0)	54 (2.1)	711 (28.0)
Source: Czech Hydrometeorological Institute

== Economy ==
The gross domestic product (GDP) per capita of the region was 81.1% of the national average in 2011. Services form the largest part of the region's economy, forming 52.4% of GDP in 2011. Other significant sectors are industry (36.9% of GDP) and construction (7.2% of GDP). The registered unemployment rate was 8.44% at the end of 2011. The highest unemployment rate was in Svitavy District.

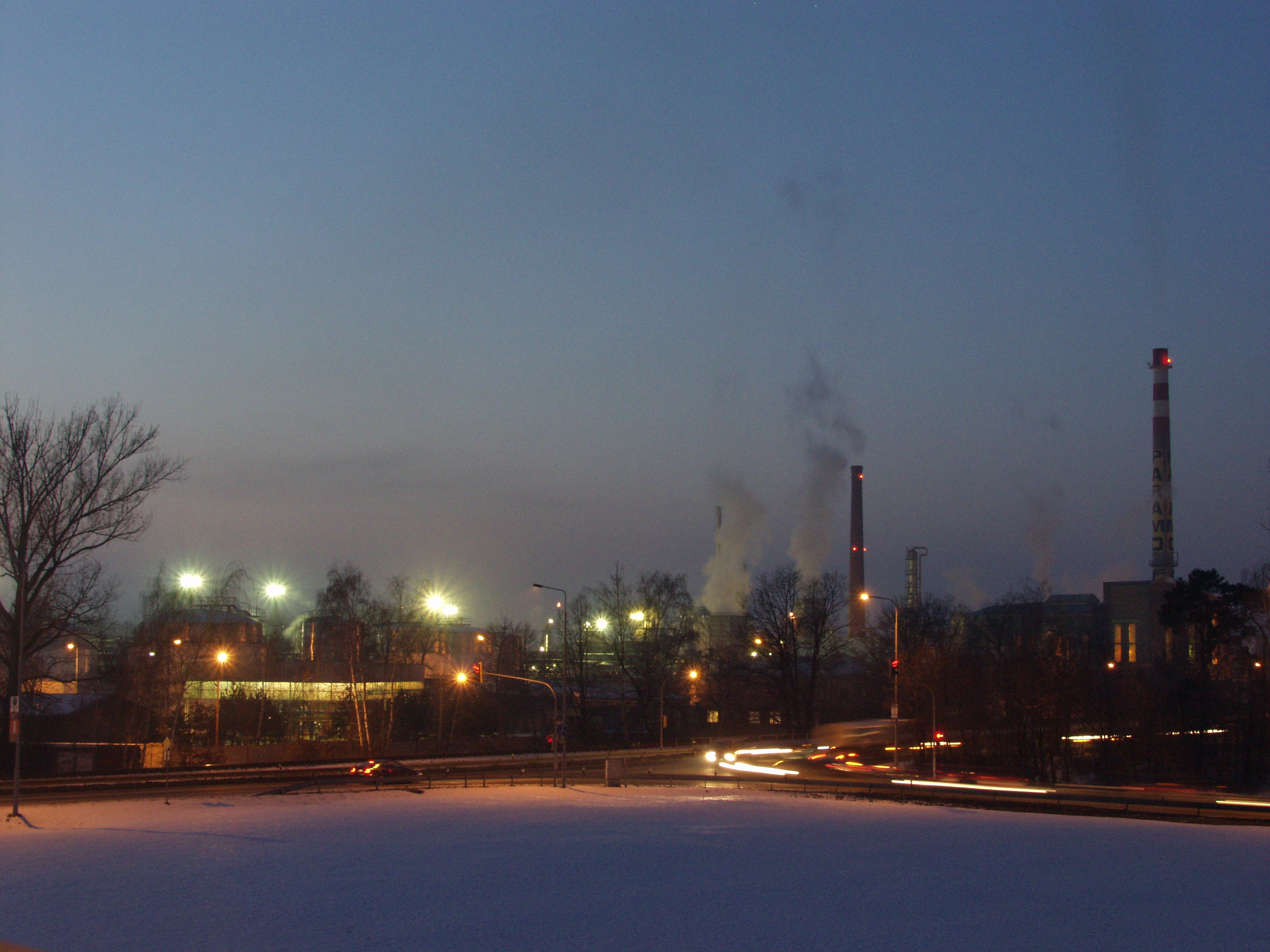
Industry in Pardubice

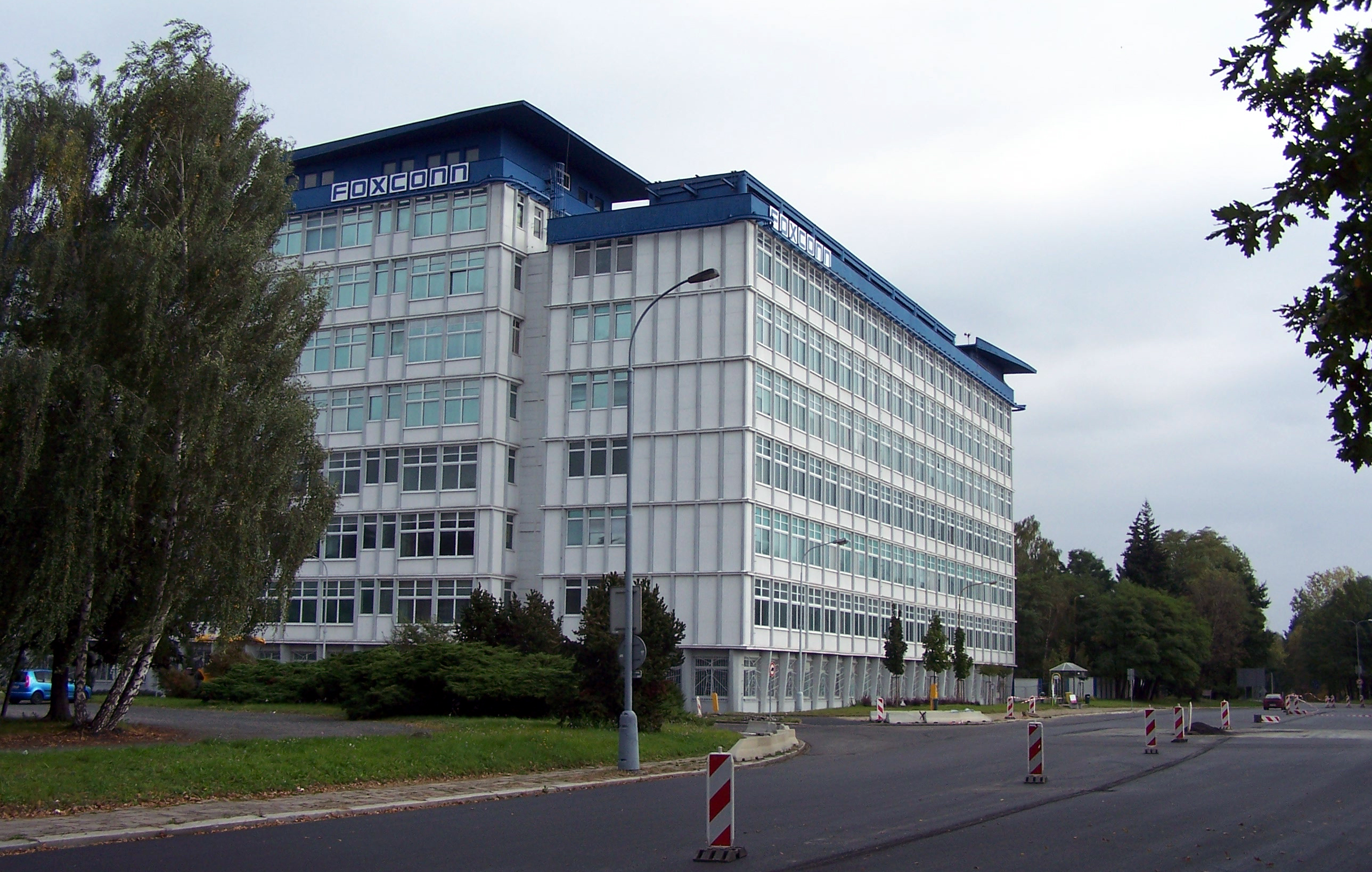
Foxconn in Pardubice (formerly Tesla Pardubice)

- Industry

Industry and commercial public services are the basis of Pardubice's economy. General engineering, textiles, clothing, and leather processing are the strongest industrial branches. The chemical industry in Pardubice Region is larger than anywhere else in the Czech Republic.

- Transport

Road networks make up 3,597 km that transverse throughout the region. Roads I/35 and I/37 (connecting to I/17 in Chrudim) are noted as the most important. A 9 km section of the D11 motorway connect the region to Prague. The two-lane R35 expressway is planned to cross the region and connect it with Liberec, Germany and the Moravian network of highways and expressways.

There are 542 km of railways in the region, connecting it to Prague, Brno, Liberec, Olomouc, Ostrava, and to Poland. The railway corridor of Berlin – Prague – Brno – Vienna crosses the region and in Pardubice it is connected to routes of national significance to Liberec and Havlíčkův Brod.

Pardubice has an international airport, operating for both public and military flights, which is listed in the category of the top 5 airports in the Czech Republic.

- Agriculture

Agriculture plays an important role in the region. The agricultural land covers about 60.2% of all land in the region, while the arable land occupies 43.8%. Forests cover 29.6% of the region.

- Tourism

Attractions from natural tourist spots (such as the Železné Hory and the Orlické Hory) to historical monuments, mostly medieval castles established since the 13th century, all encourage tourism to the region. The most significant historical monuments in the region are connected with the noble Pernštejn family from Moravia, who had two huge castles built, at Litice nad Orlicí, and on Kunětická hora near Pardubice. In 2011 there were 365 facilities providing accommodation in the region for 324,000 visitors.

== Education and health care ==
In 2011 there were:

- 309 kindergartens with 17,994 students
- 251 elementary schools with 41,184 students
- 21 secondary elementary schools (Czech: gymnázium) with 6,305 students
- 55 high schools with 16,413 students
- 10 colleges (Czech: vyšší odborná škola) with 1,135 students
- University of Pardubice with seven faculties and more than 10,000 students.

Furthermore, there were nine hospitals with a capacity of 2,584 patients. In total, there were 2,009 doctors in the region and the patient-per-doctor ratio was 257.

== Places of interest ==
- National Breeding Stud at Kladruby nad Labem
- Králíky and Králický Sněžník National Nature Reserve
- Kunětická hora Castle
- Lanškroun Ponds Nature Park
- Letohrad and its Museum of Crafts
- Litomyšl with the Renaissance Chateau
- Nové Hrady Chateau
- Pardubice with the Pardubice Chateau and Grand Pardubice Steeplechase
- Svojanov Castle
- Veselý Kopec, the largest collection of folk architecture in Bohemia
- Železné Hory National Geopark

== Gallery ==
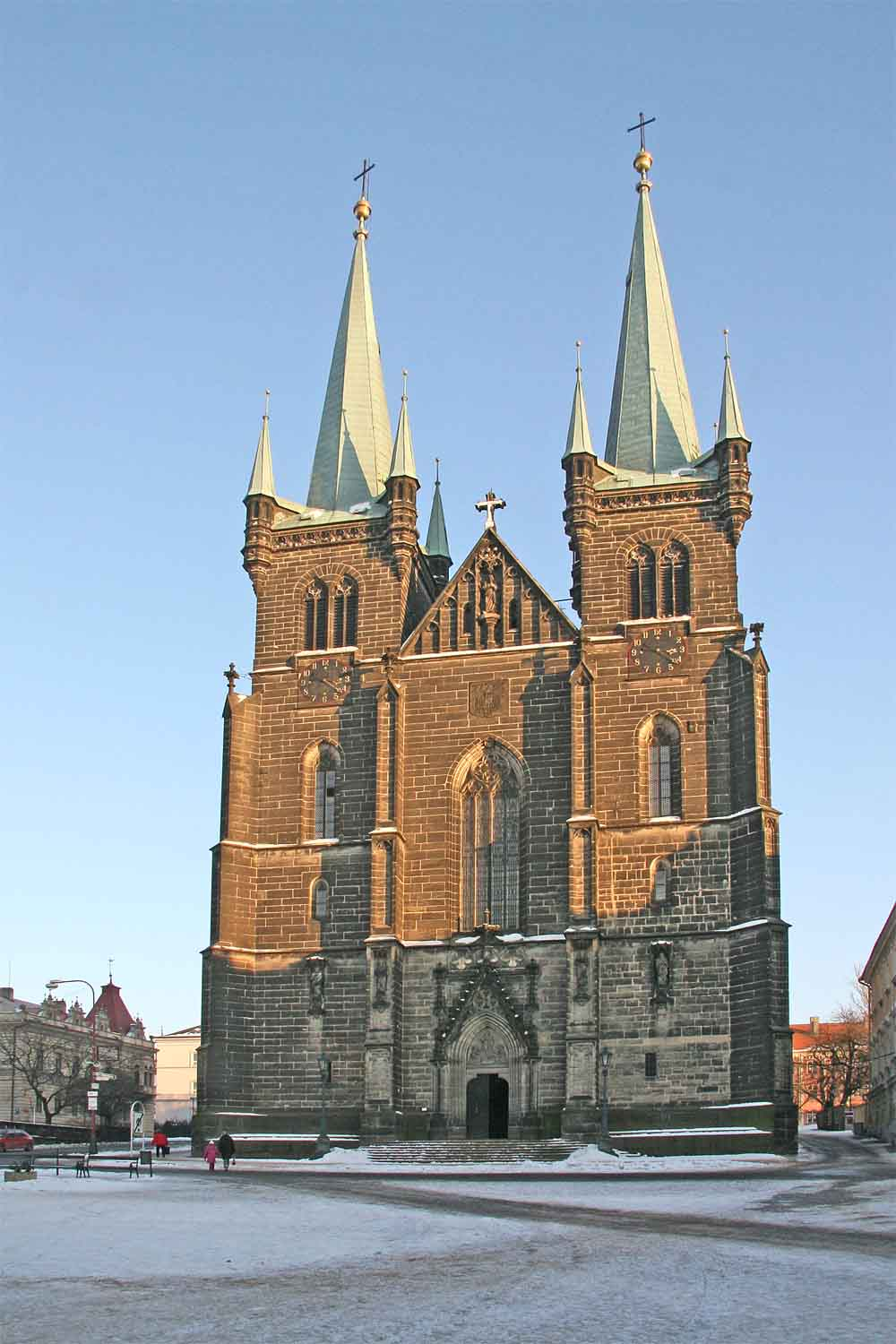
Chrudim

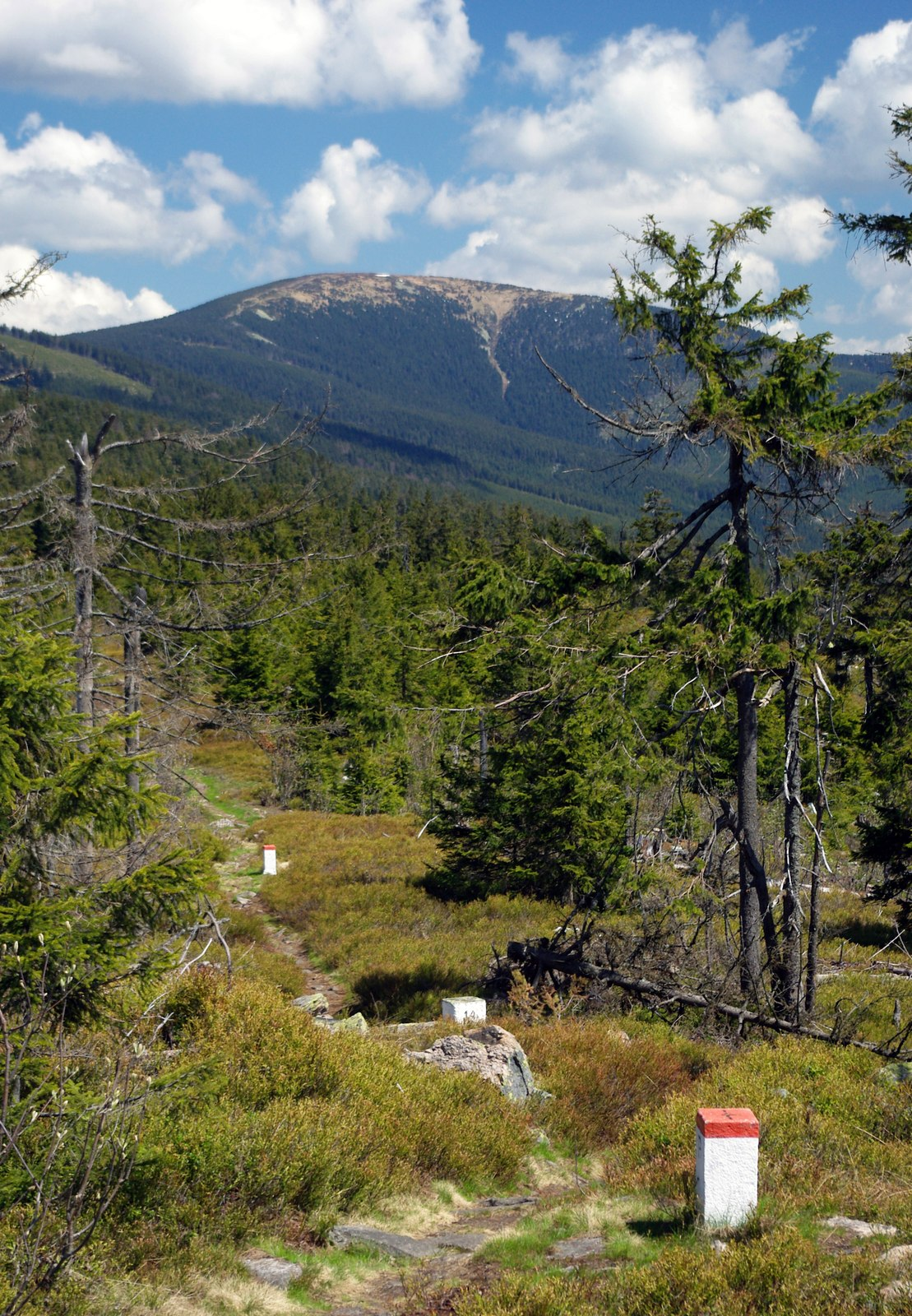
Kralický Sněžník

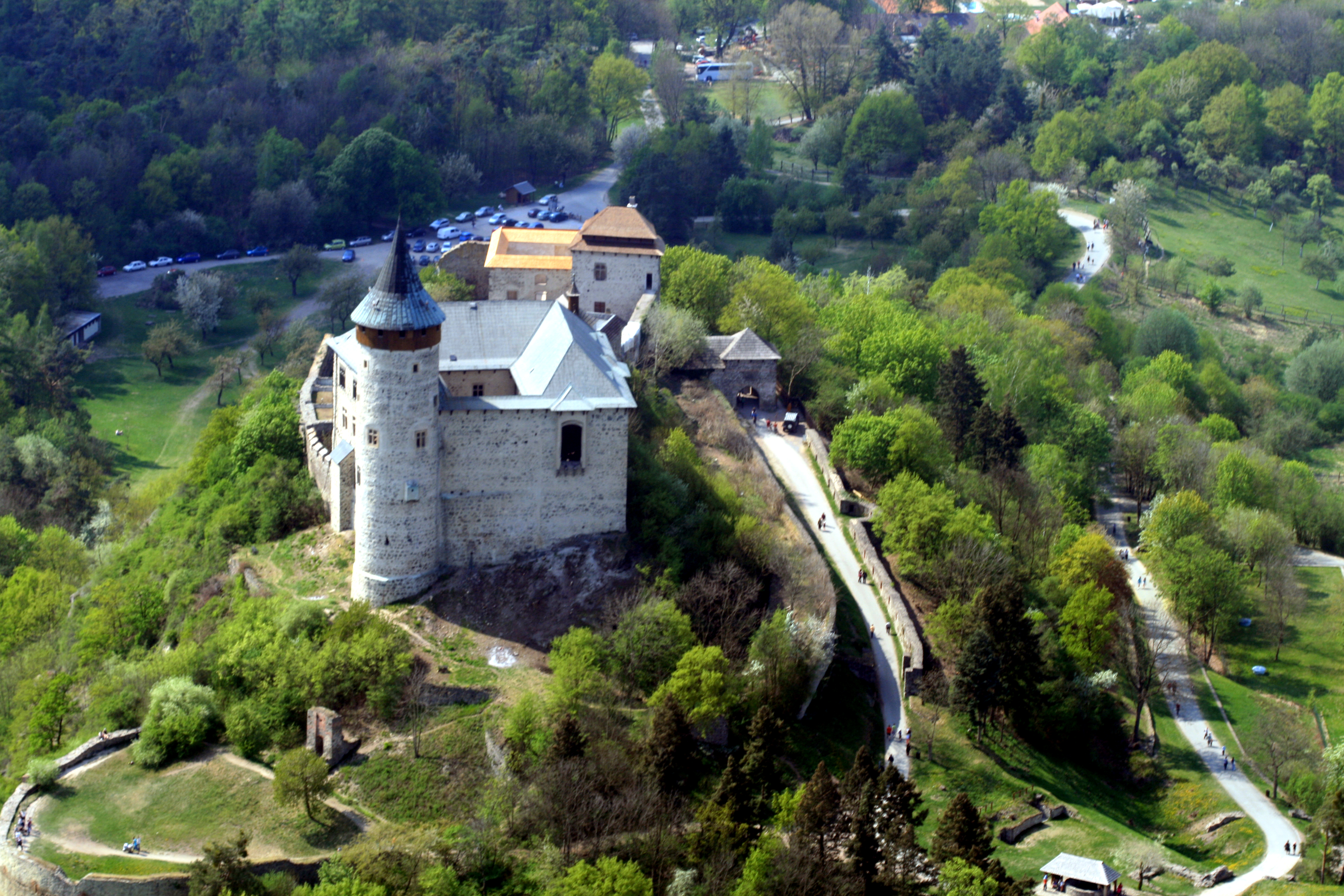
Kunětická hora Castle

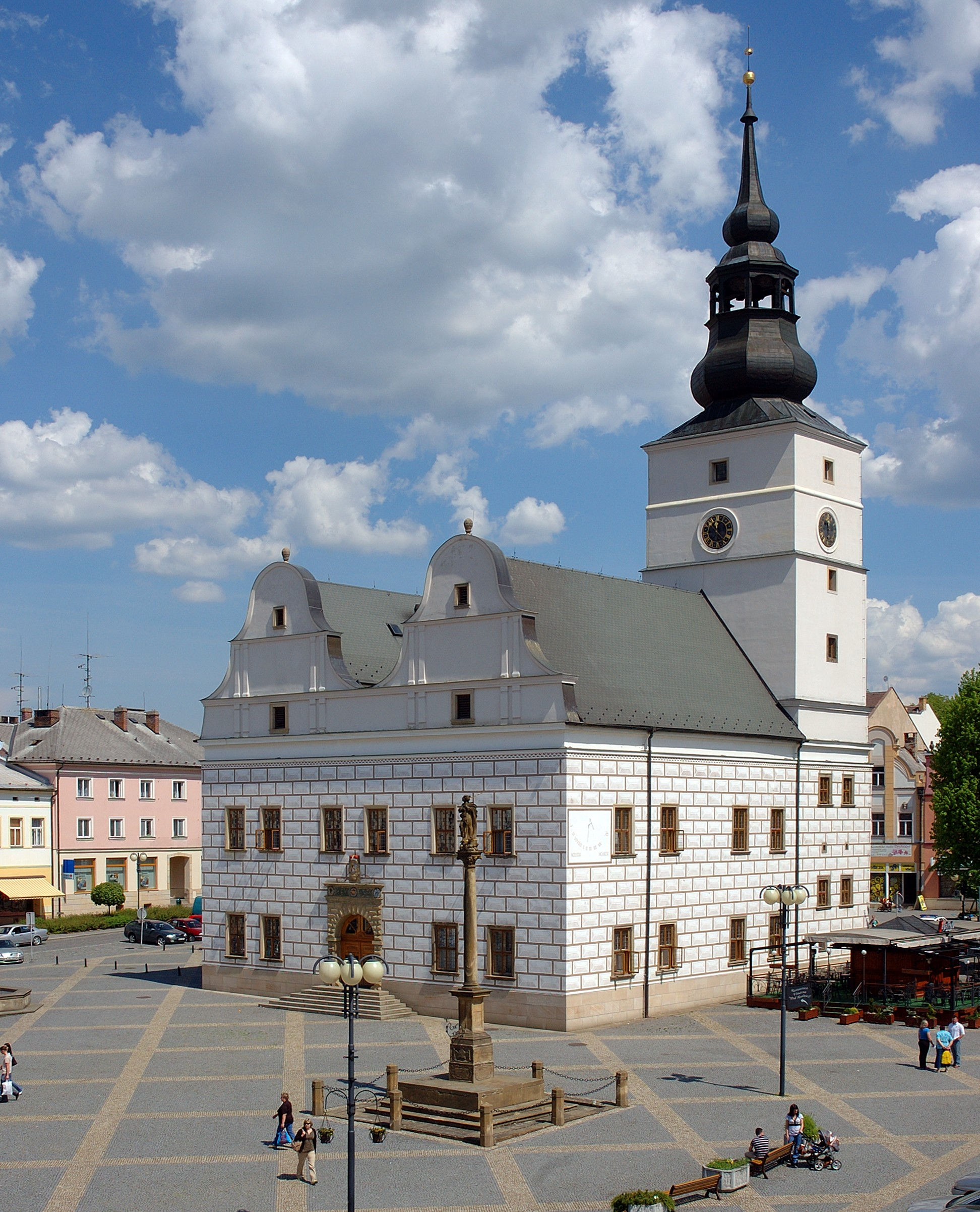
Lanškroun Town Hall

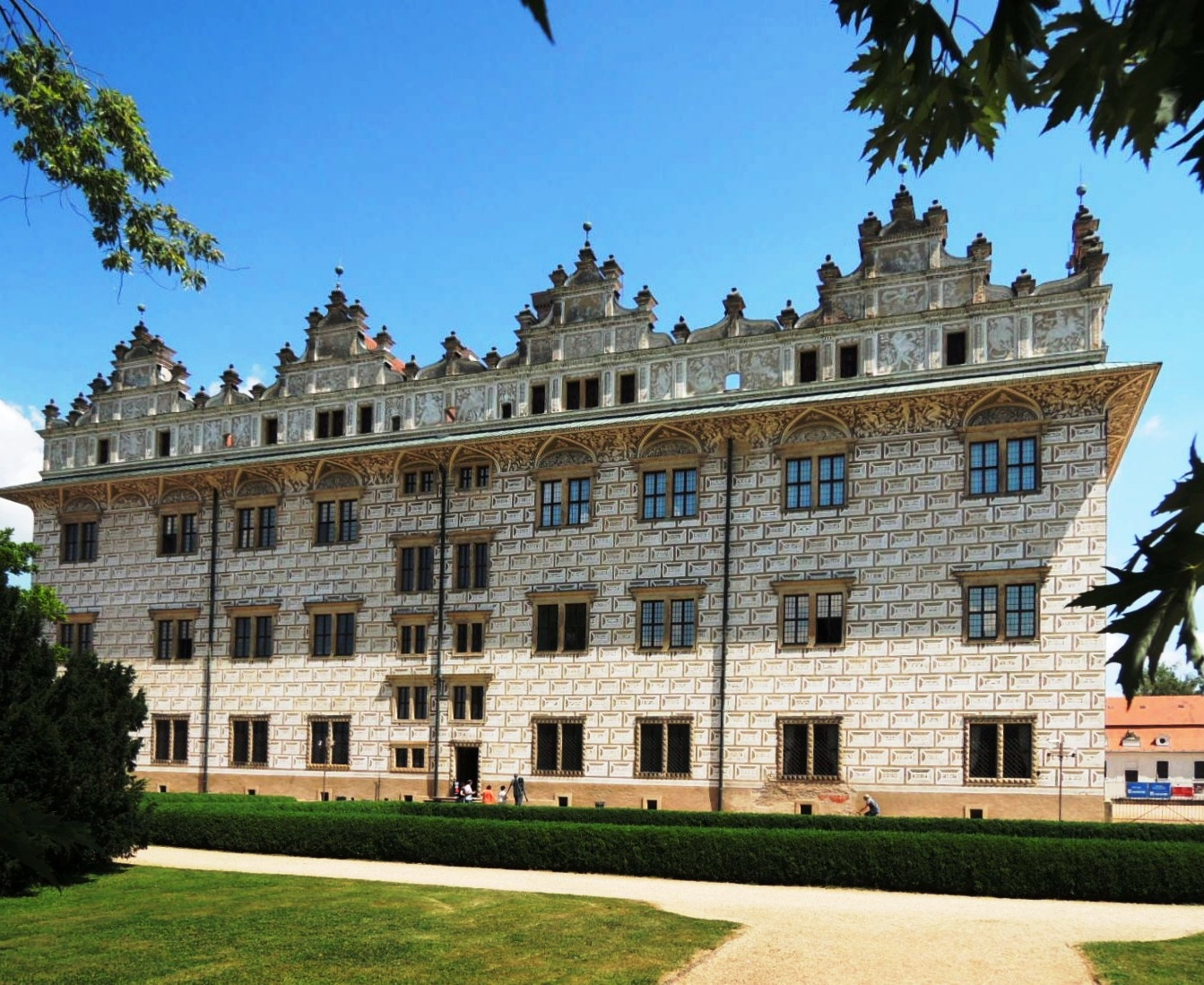
Litomyšl Chateau

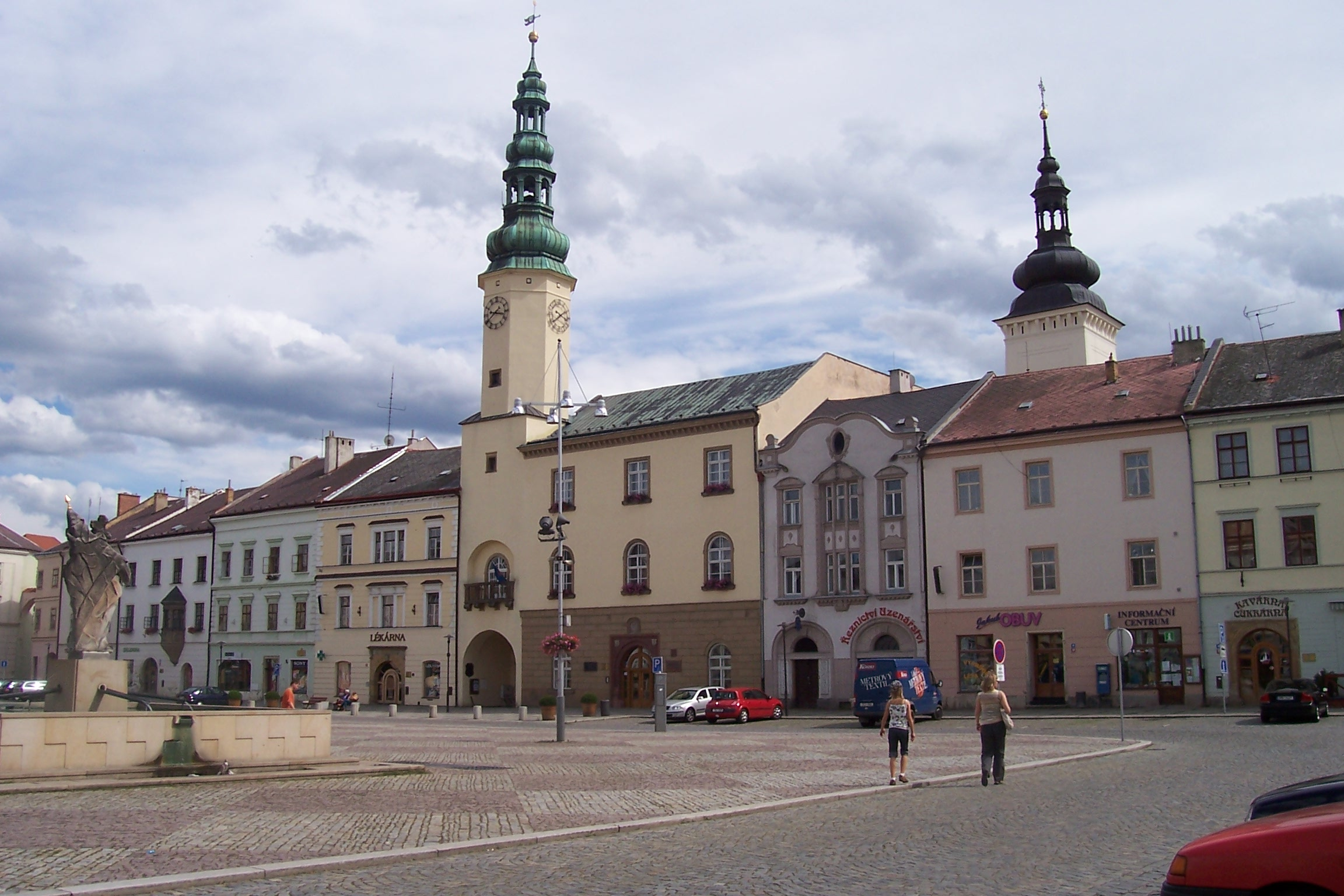
Moravská Třebová

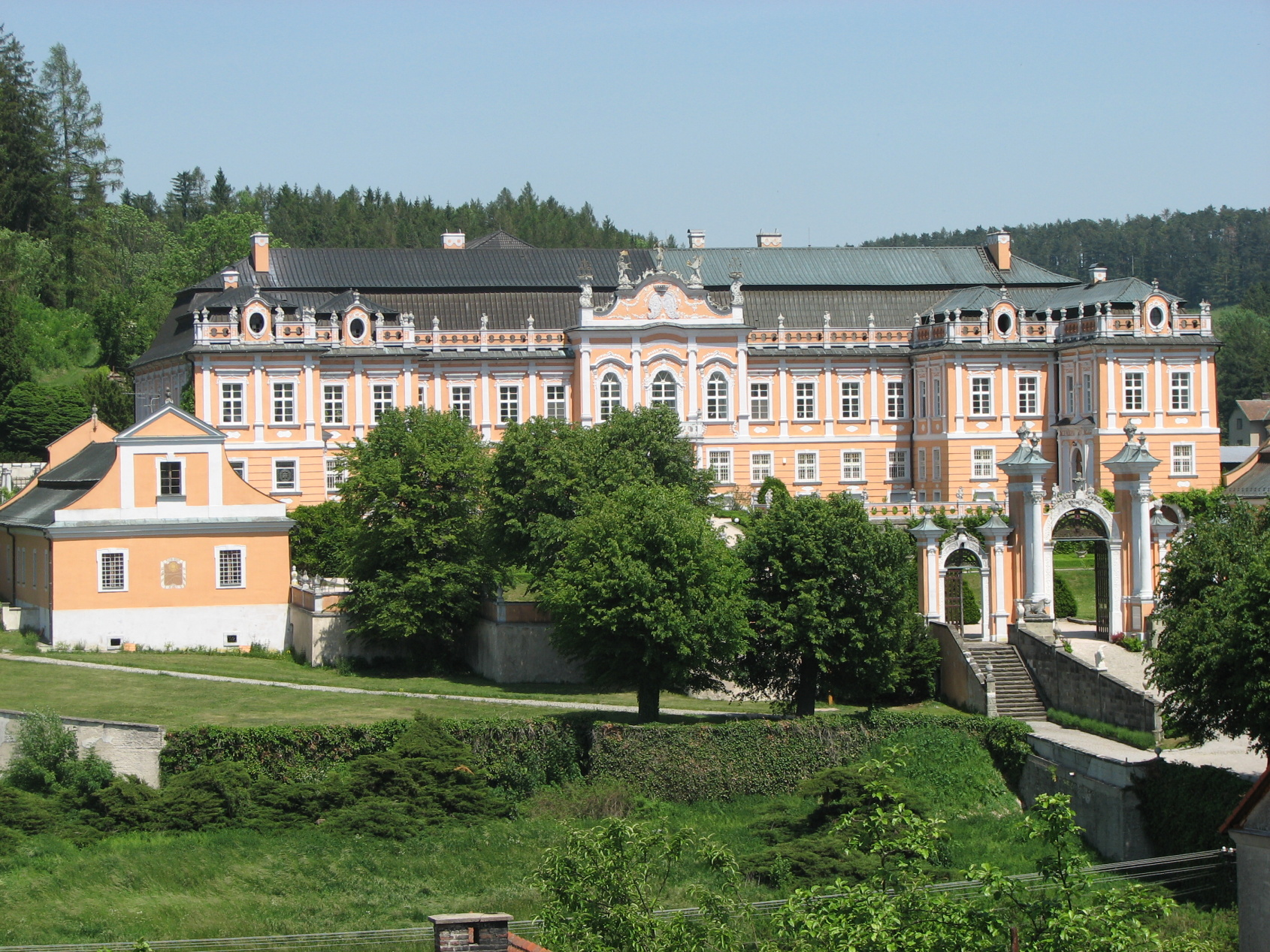
Nové Hrady Castle

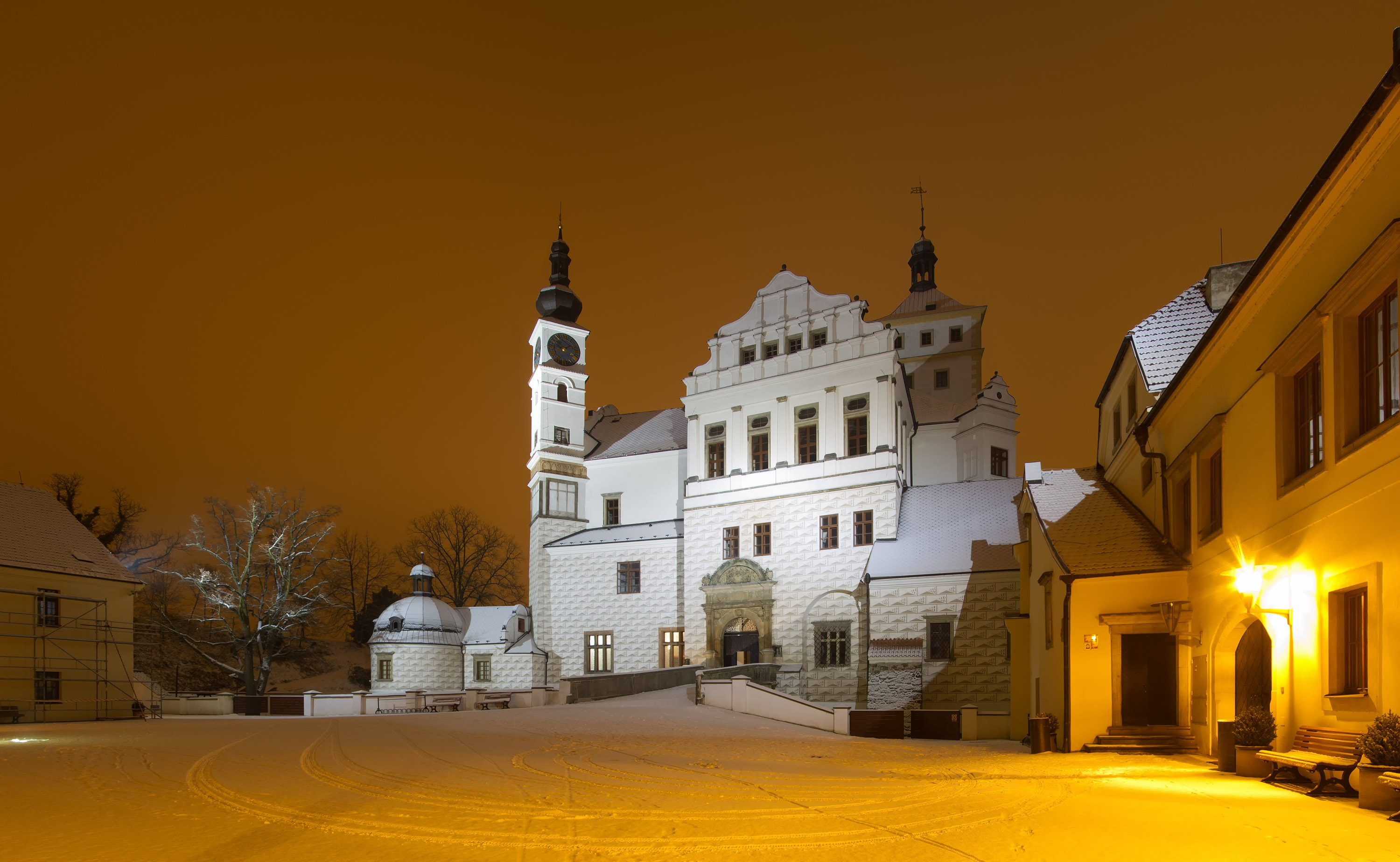
Pardubice Castle

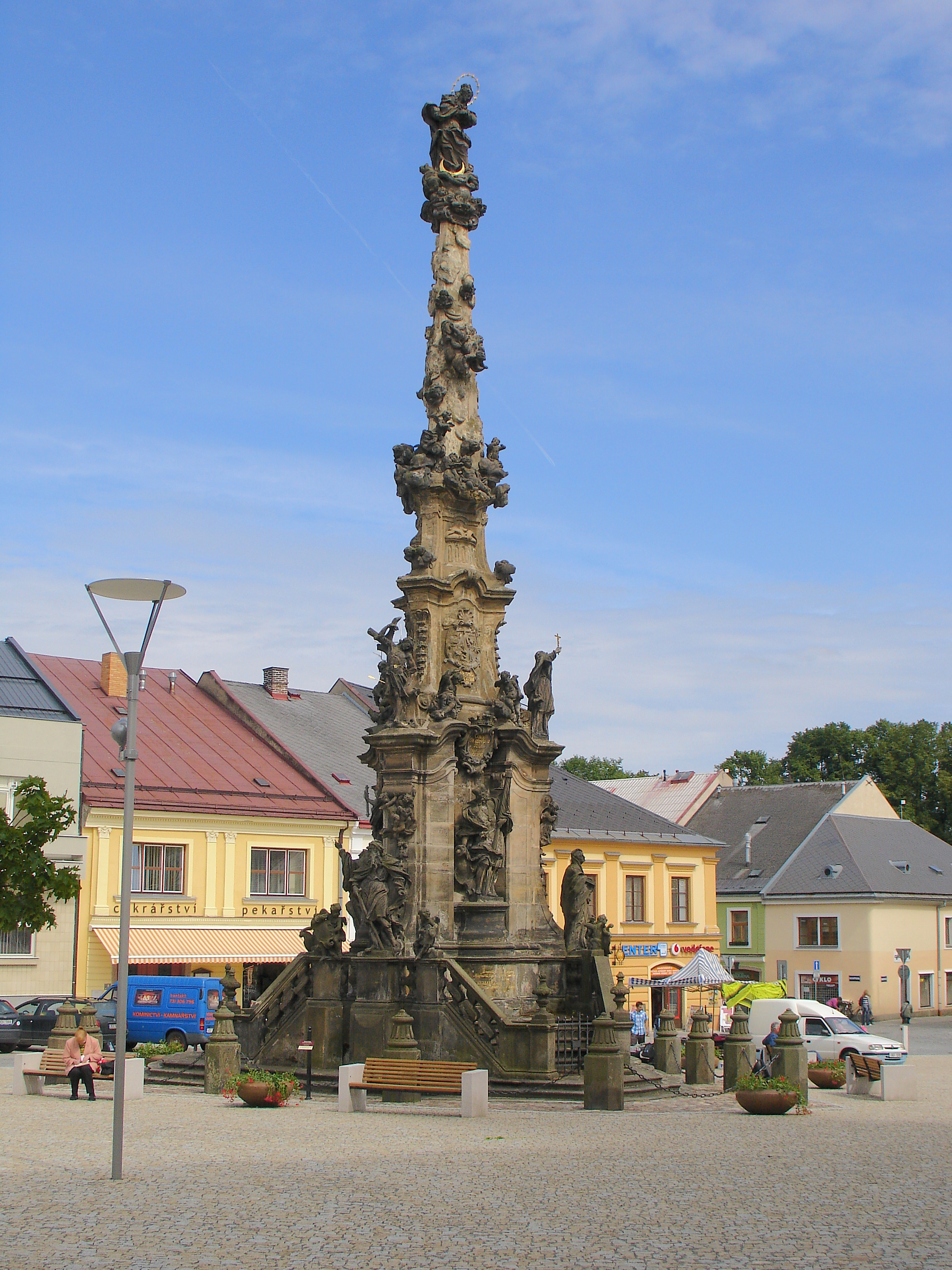
Polička

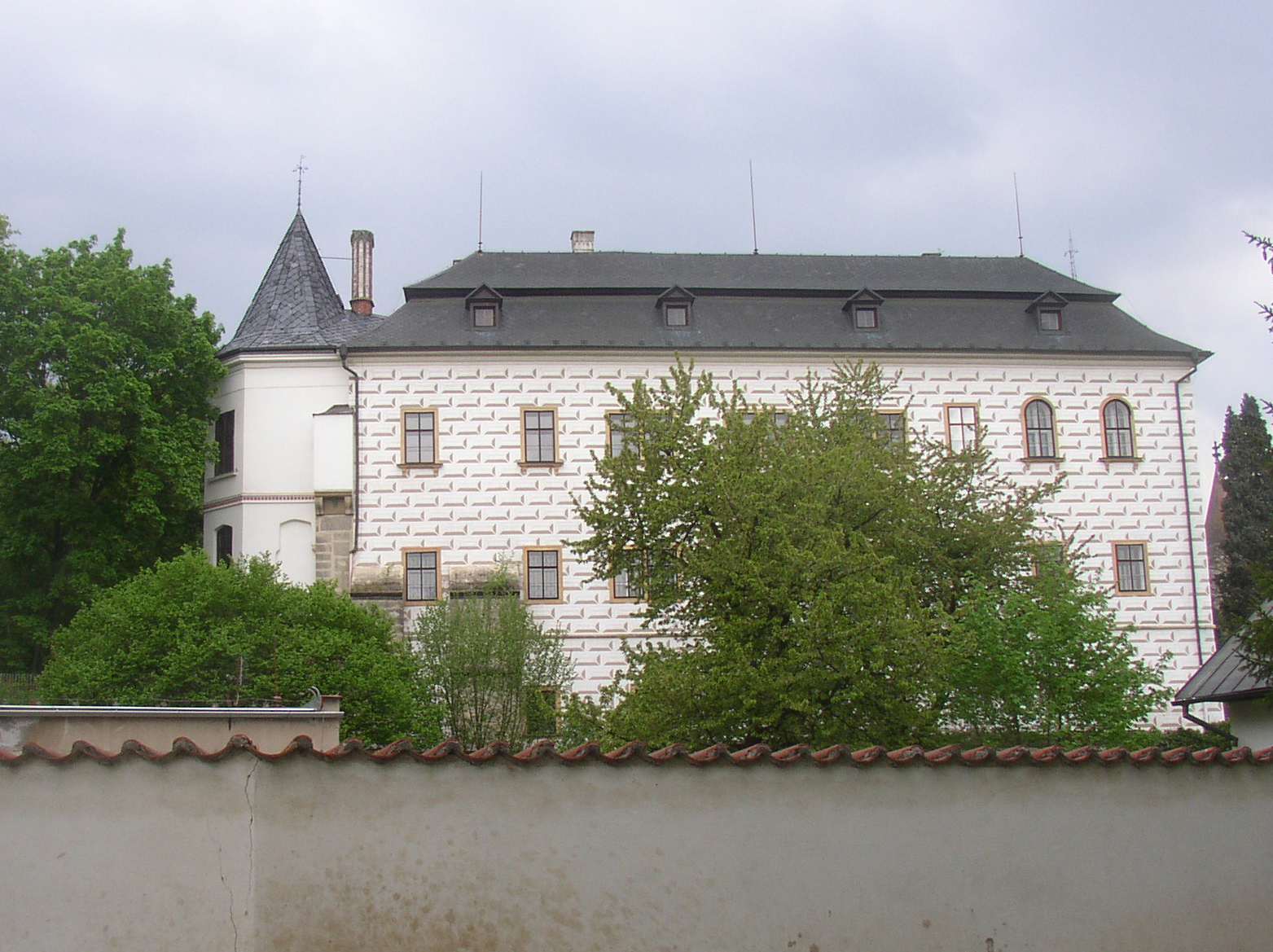
Slatiňany Castle

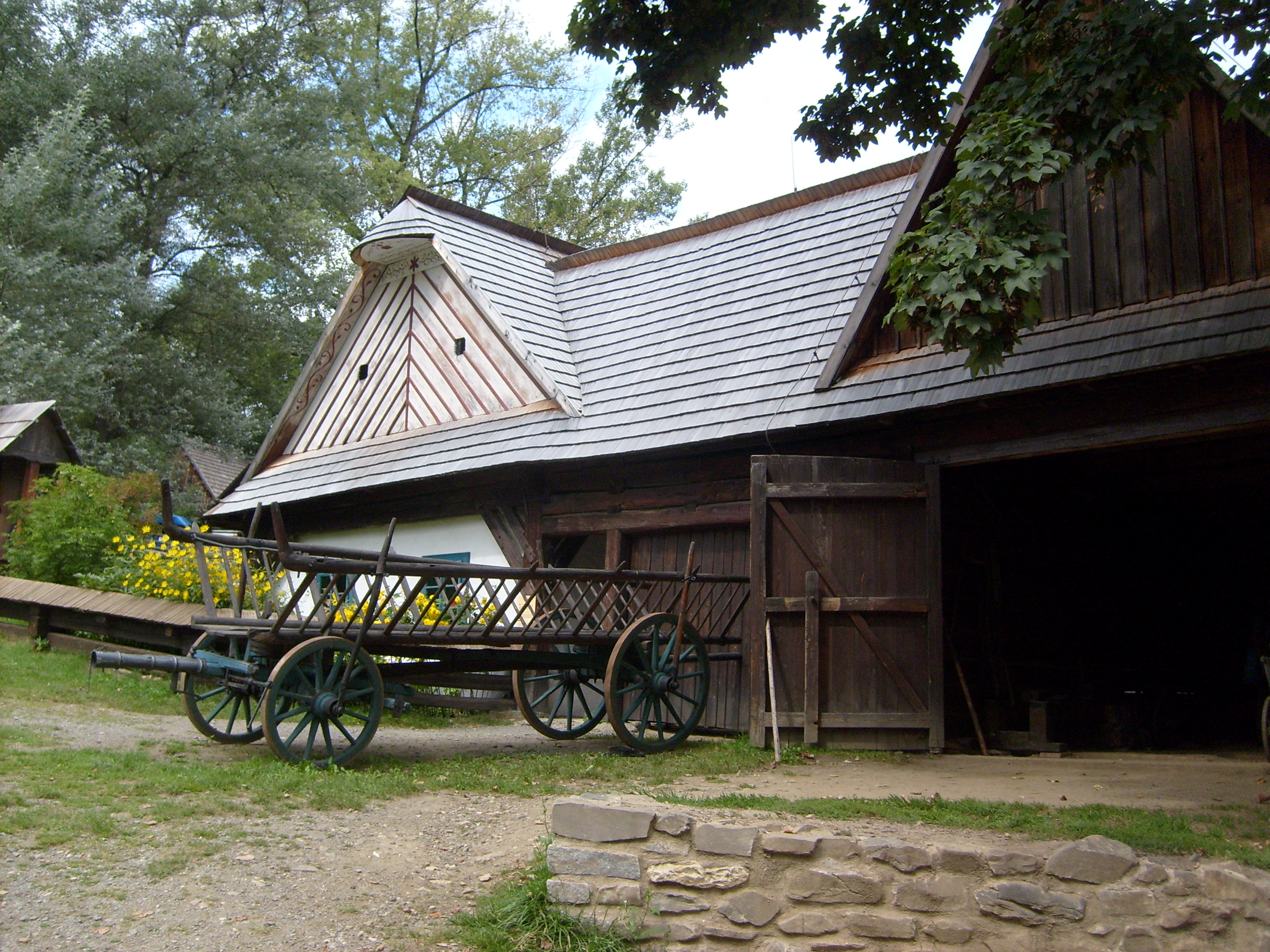
Veselý Kopec

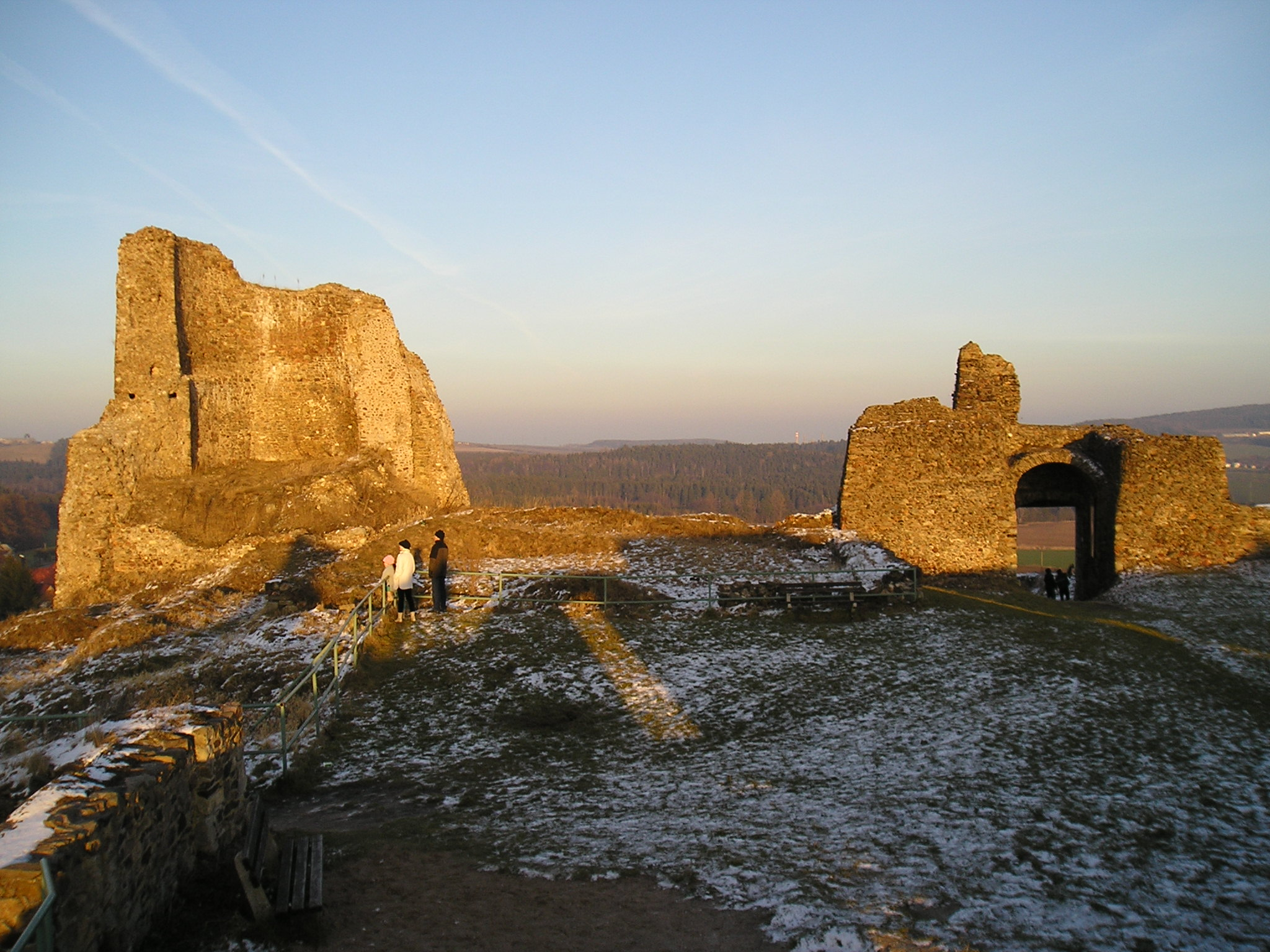
Iron Mountains
