= Śnieżnik Landscape Park =

Protected area in south-western Poland

- Śnieżnicki Park Krajobrazowy
- IUCN category V (protected landscape/seascape)
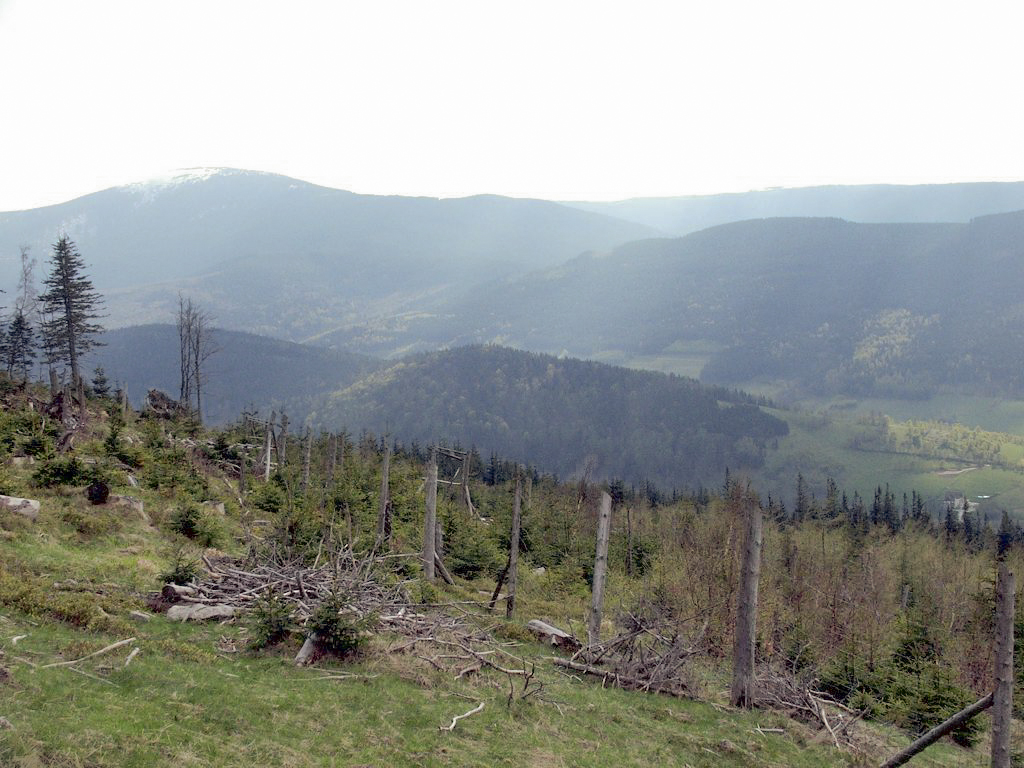
- View of Śnieżnik from Mount Suszyca
- Interactive map of Śnieżnik Landscape Park
- Location: Lower Silesian Voivodeship
- Coordinates: 50°14′30″N 16°48′30″E
- Area: 288.00 km^{2} (111.20 sq mi)
- Established: 1981

Śnieżnik Landscape Park (Śnieżnicki Park Krajobrazowy) is a protected area (Landscape Park) in south-western Poland, established in 1981, and covering an area of 288.00 square kilometres (111.20 sq mi). It is located in the Snieznik Mountains and the Golden Mountains, two shorter mountain ranges in the Eastern Sudetes, along the border with the Czech Republic. It is part of the Krkonoše/Karkonosze Transboundary Biosphere Reserve, mixed mountain and highland system, bearing UNESCO designation.

The Landscape Park takes its name from the highest peak in the range, Śnieżnik (1,424 m), which forms a triangle with (similarly sounding) Śnieżka, as well as Ślęża peaks, further apart, connected by a red hiking trail only for qualified tourists.

== Location ==
The Śnieżnik Landscape Park lies within Lower Silesian Voivodeship: in Kłodzko County (Gmina Bystrzyca Kłodzka, Gmina Kłodzko, Gmina Lądek-Zdrój, Gmina Międzylesie, Gmina Stronie Śląskie) and Ząbkowice County (Gmina Złoty Stok).

Within the Landscape Park are five nature reserves.
