= European watershed =

Drainage divides of the European continent

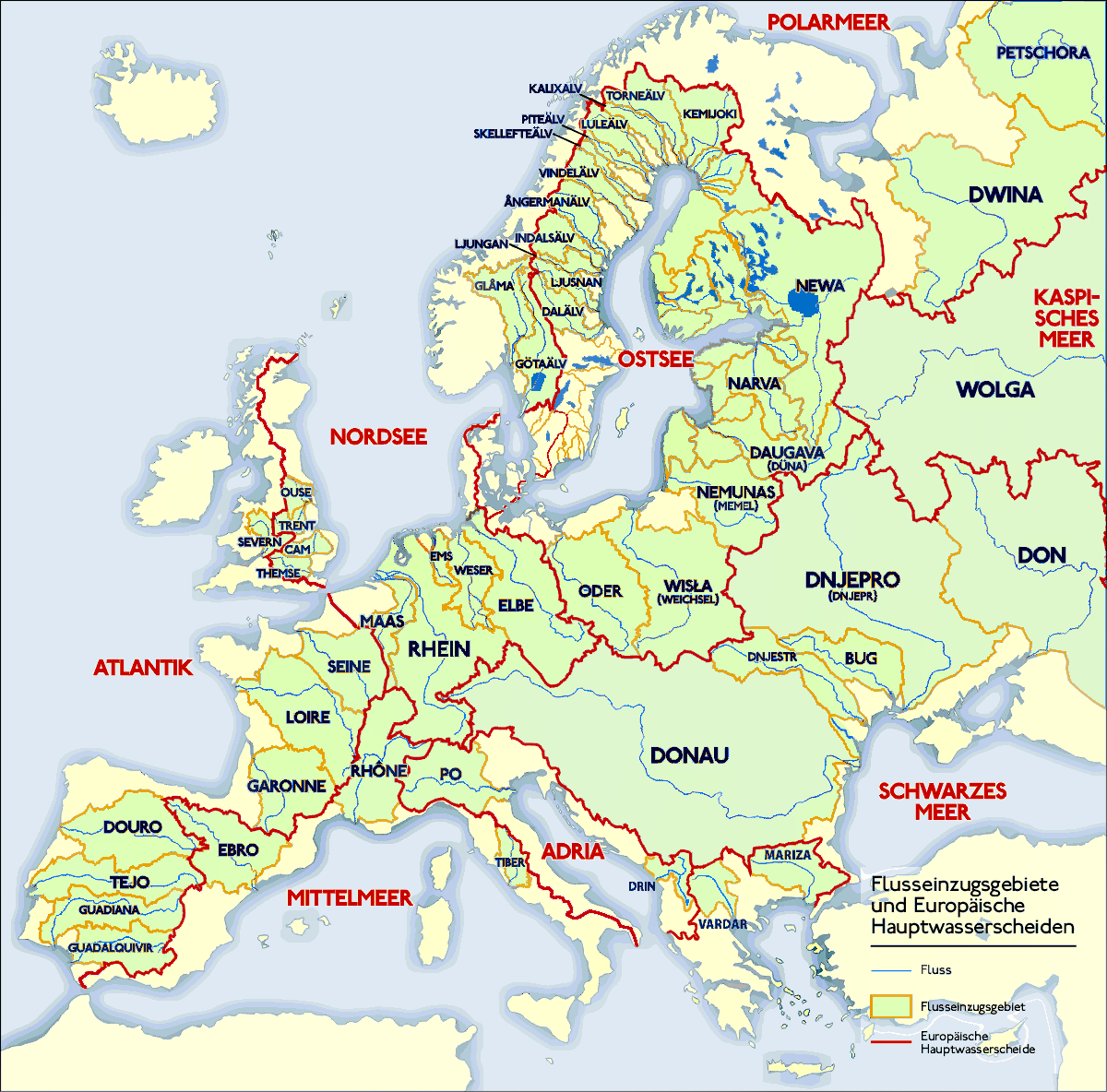
Main European drainage divides (red lines) separating catchments (green regions).

The main European watershed is the drainage divide ("watershed") which separates the basins of the rivers that empty into the Atlantic Ocean, the North Sea and the Baltic Sea from those that feed the Mediterranean Sea, the Adriatic Sea and the Black Sea. It stretches from the tip of the Iberian Peninsula at Gibraltar in the southwest to the endorheic basin of the Caspian Sea in Russia in the northeast.

== Course ==
=== Atlantic—Mediterranean ===
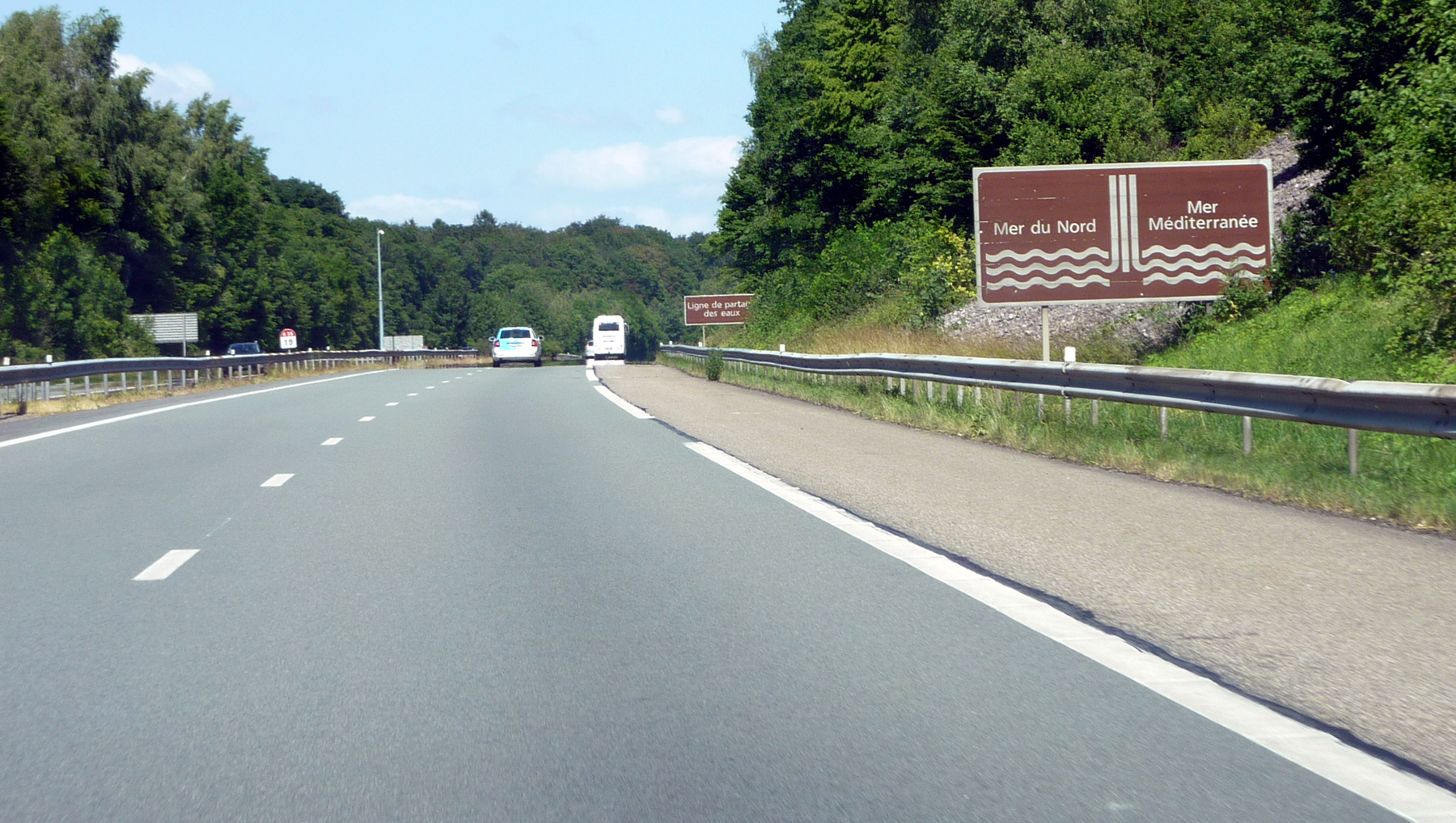
Atlantic—Mediterranean watershed marker between Belfort and Mulhouse on the A36 autoroute

The Watershed runs northwards through Spain in the Iberian Peninsula towards the Bay of Biscay along the basins of the Guadalquivir, Guadiana, Tagus and Douro in the west to the sources of the Ebro in Cantabria. It then follows the main ridge of the Pyrenees eastwards up to Andorra, where it again turns to the north through France along the catchment areas of the Garonne (with the summit of the Canal du Midi at Seuil de Naurouze), Loire and Seine in the west and that of the Rhone in the east, marked by the Cévennes mountain range between the sources of the Allier and Ardèche tributaries. The European watershed meets the Atlantic-North Sea Continental Divide at the triple point between the Atlantic, North Sea and Mediterranean Sea at Mount Piémont in Northeast France.

At the Belfort Gap south of the Vosges Mountains it separates the Rhone basin in the southwest from the drainage of the Meuse and Rhine in the northeast, turns southwards to the Swiss Jura Mountains and passes between Lake Geneva and Lake Neuchâtel. It reaches the Bernese Alps where it crosses the Jungfrau and the Finsteraarhorn, at 4,274 m the high point of the watershed, before dropping to the Grimselpass, rising to the Dammastock before crossing the Furkapass and joining the Alpine divide near the Witenwasserenstock, the triple watershed of the Rhone, Rhine and Po rivers. East of here it crosses the Gotthard Pass and runs along the Adula Alps until it reaches the triple point of the Rhine, Po and Danube basins at the "roof of Europe" near Piz Lunghin west of the Maloja Pass.

=== Atlantic—Black Sea ===
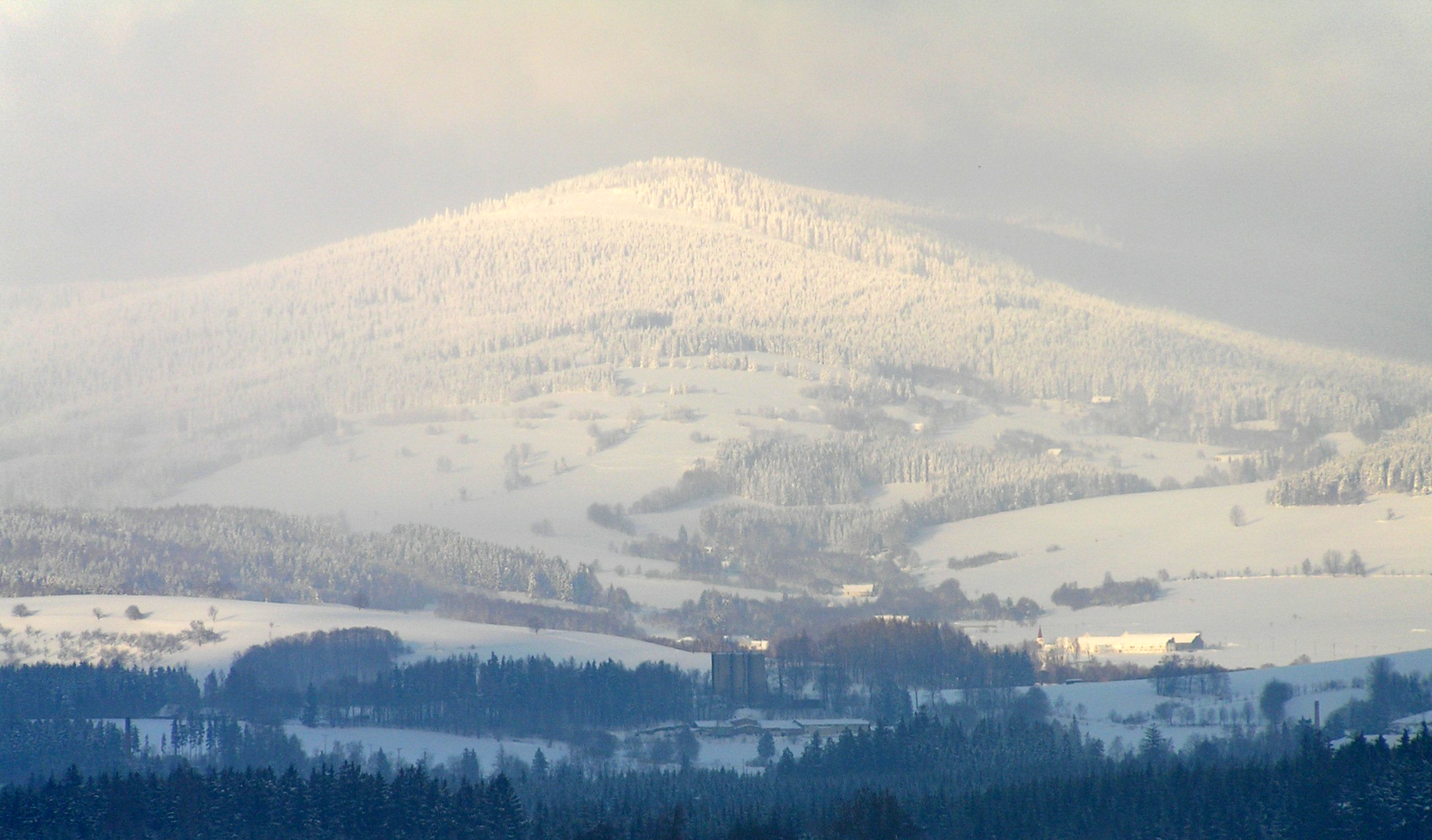
Klepáč – one of six places in Europe where three watersheds meet

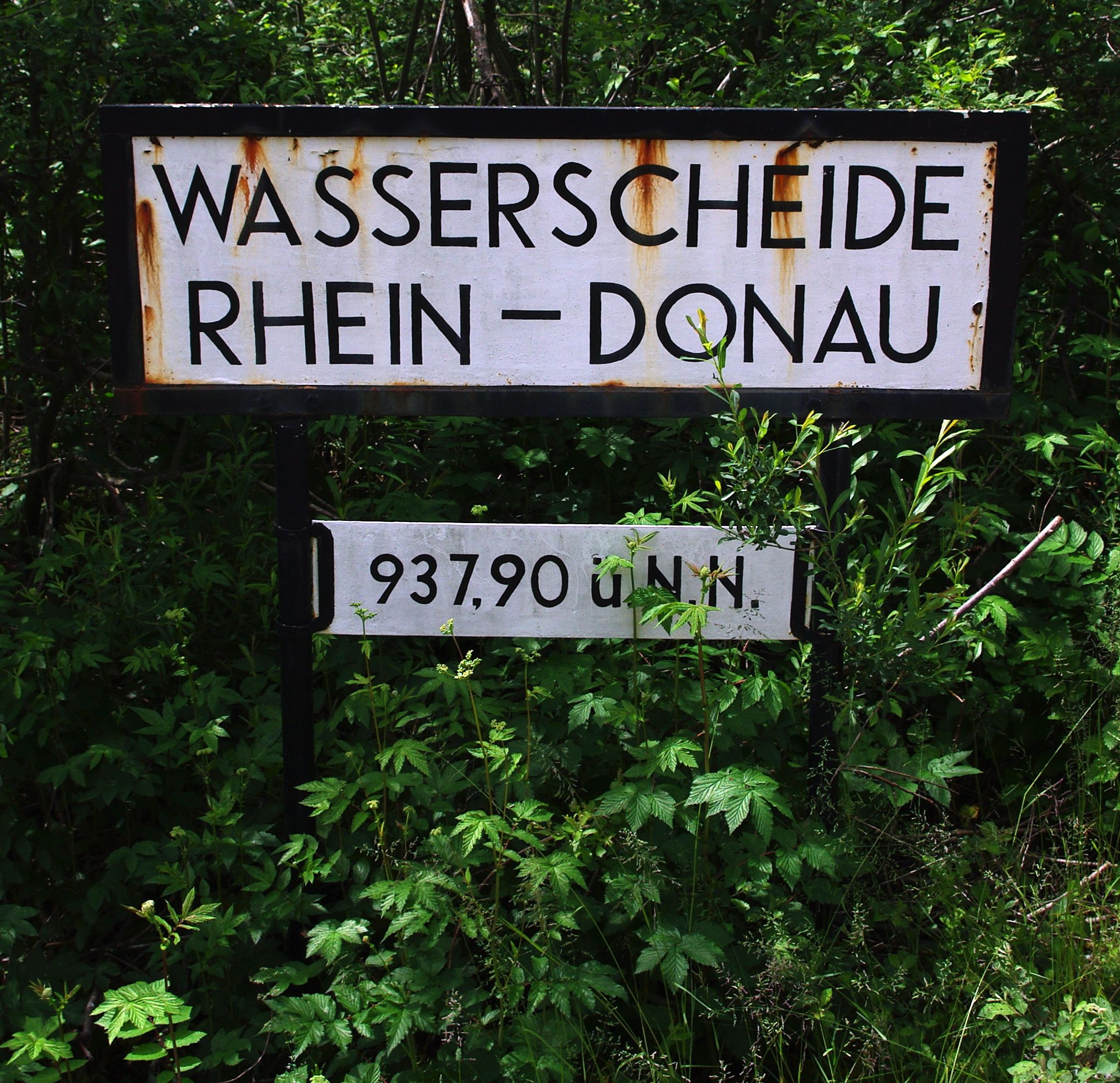
Rhine–Danube watershed marker near Weitnau, Germany

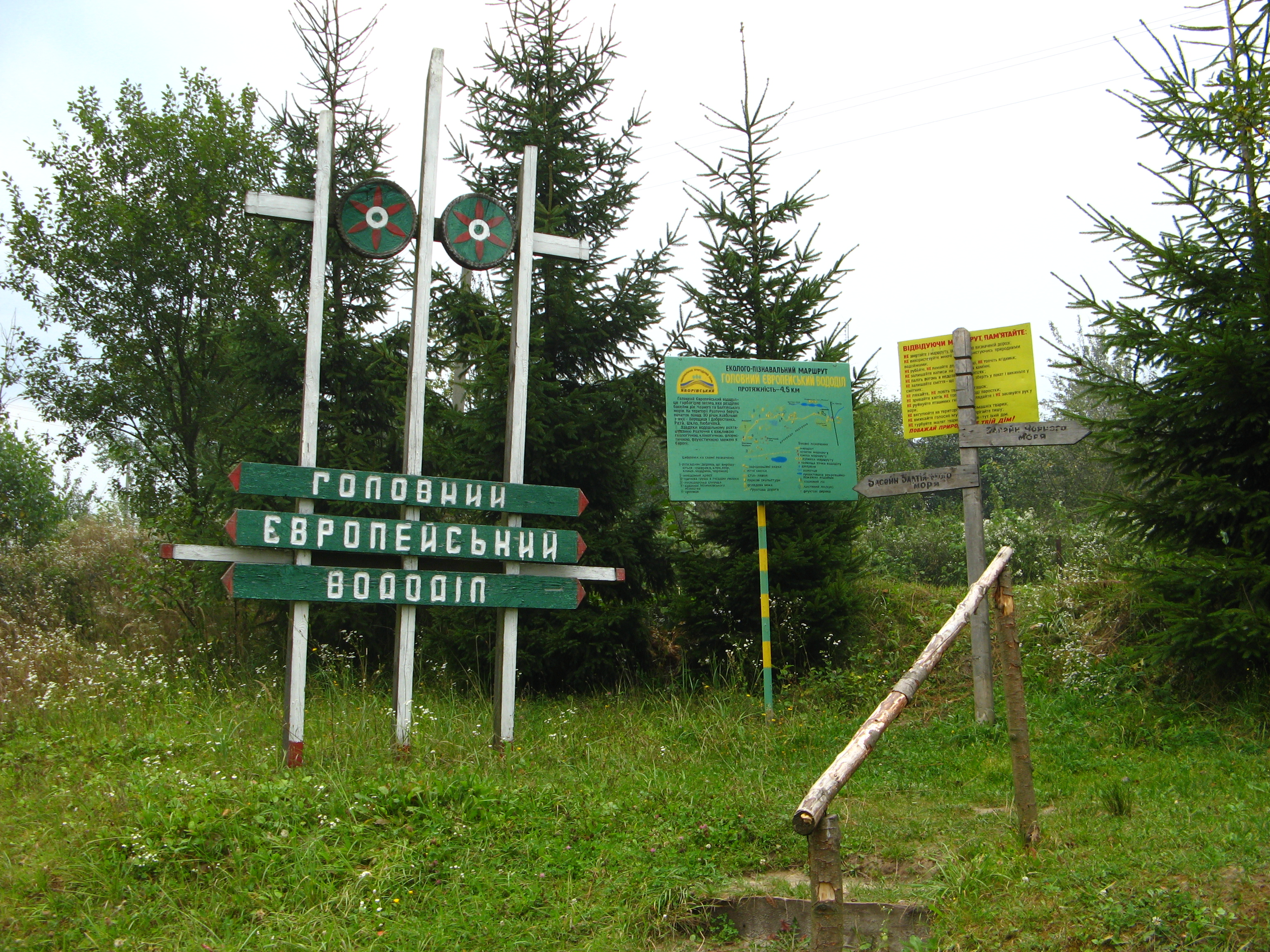
European watershed marker (Lviv Oblast, 2009)

The divide continues northwards along the Albula Alps to Julier Pass, Albula Pass and Flüela Pass south of Davos, between the catchment area of the Rhine, which empties into the North Sea via the Netherlands, and the Danube, which flows eastward emptying into the Black Sea. It enters Austria at Piz Buin in the Silvretta Alps, running along the Arlberg massif and forming the border between the states of Tyrol and Vorarlberg. It reaches Bavaria, Germany, via the crest of the Allgäu Alps and leaves the High Alps at the Adelegg range near Kempten.

Within the Alpine foothills it runs north of the Schussen catchment area of Lake Constance towards the sources of the Brigach and Breg headwaters of the Danube in the Black Forest. It then follows the main ridge of the Swabian and Franconian Jura with the crossing of the Rhine–Main–Danube Canal northeastwards up to the Fichtel Mountains and southeastwards along the Bohemian Forest, forming the border between Germany and the Austrian Mühlviertel and Waldviertel regions with the Czech Republic, where the large Bohemian basin is drained by the Elbe River. It again turns northeastwards along the Javořice Highlands to the Králický Sněžník Mountains of the Eastern Sudetes at the border with Poland, where the triple point of the Orlice, Elbe (North Sea); Morava, Danube (Black Sea); and Eastern Neisse, Oder (Baltic Sea) is located at the peak of Klepáč (Trójmorski Wierch). At this point, the European Watershed connects to the North Sea–Baltic Sea Continental Divide.

The Watershed continues in an eastern direction along the Jeseníky Mountains down to the Moravian Gate and uphill into the Beskids, with the Oder and Vistula basins in the north, reaching the triple point of Poland with Slovakia and Ukraine in the Bieszczady Mountains. Then, the Watershed goes northeast near the Poland–Ukraine border, passes through the city of Lviv and, via Volyn, enters Belarus. Then it runs east-northeast along the Belarusian Ridge and continues to the Smolensk Oblast of Russia, ending at the triple point with the Caspian drainage basin in the Sychyovsky District, near the midpoint between the Western Russian cities of Smolensk and Tver.

== Characteristics ==
The watershed is not a clearly defined divide.

For example, tectonics in the area which is now the Upper Rhine Plain created the river Rhine. The Rhine's sharper altitude gradient on its much shorter way to the North Sea causes much stronger headward erosion than that of the much older River Danube (see the Danube upper river geology). Therefore the Rhine and its tributaries intrude deeper into phreatic zones of the Swabian Karst and even capture the upper Danube and its surface tributaries. It is expected that the Danube's upper course will one day disappear entirely in favour of the Rhine ("stream capture").

== See also ==
- Continental Divide of the Americas
- Continental divide
- Category:Drainage basins
