= Králický Sněžník =

Mountain in the Czech Republic and Poland

Králický Sněžník Śnieżnik
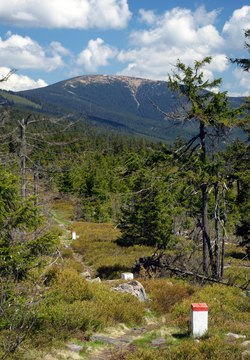
- Southern view of the mountain

Highest point
- Elevation: 1,423 m (4,669 ft)
- Prominence: 665 m (2,182 ft)
- Parent peak: Praděd
- Isolation: 30 km (19 mi)
- Coordinates: 50°12′25″N 16°50′56″E

Geography
- Location within Czech Republic Location within Poland
- Location: Dolní Morava / Stronie Śląskie
- Country: Czech Republic / Poland
- Parent range: Králický Sněžník Mountains
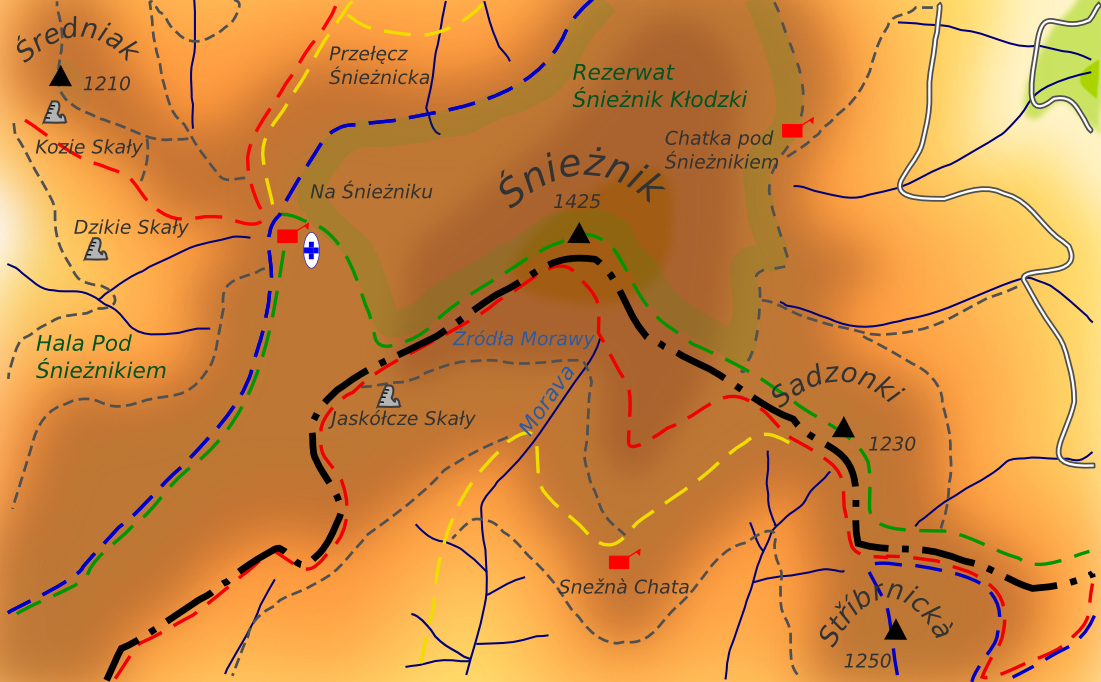
- Topo map

Králický Sněžník (Czech pronunciation: [ˈkraːlɪtskiː ˈsɲɛʒɲiːk]) or Śnieżnik (Polish pronunciation: [ˈɕɲɛʐɲik]) is a mountain on the border between the Czech Republic and Poland. With 1,423 metres (4,669 ft), it is the highest mountain of the Králický Sněžník Mountains.

== Etymology ==
The name Sněžník or Śnieżnik derives from the word for "snow"; the mountain has snow cover for up to eight months a year. In Czech the adjective Králický (from the nearby town of Králíky) is added to distinguish it from the mountain called Děčínský Sněžník (near the town of Děčín). An alternative Polish name is Śnieżnik Kłodzki, from the town of Kłodzko. In German the mountain is known as Glatzer Schneeberg (from Glatz, the German name for Kłodzko), Grulicher Schneeberg (from Grulich, the German name for Králíky), or Spieglitzer Schneeberg (from Spieglitz, which is now part of Staré Město).

== Geography ==
The mountain is the highest peak of the Králický Sněžník Mountains. It lies between the town Králíky and the Kłodzko Valley that separates it from the Golden Mountains.

The massive was formed during the Tertiary. Sněžník lies on the water divide for the Black Sea (the Morava) and the Baltic Sea (the Nysa Kłodzka). Klepáč, the water divide for the Black Sea, the Baltic Sea, and the North Sea (the stream Lipkovský potok) lies 7 km (4 mi) south of Sněžník.

Between 1899 and 1973 a stone view-tower stood on the Silesian side of the mountain top. A statue of a young elephant was put in place of a former chalet.

On the Czech side, the Králický Sněžník National Nature Reserve was designated in 1991. It has an area of 1,708.1 hectares (4,221 acres). On the Polish side is the protected area of Śnieżnik Landscape Park.

The mountain and neighbouring areas are equipped for ski recreation.

== Gallery ==
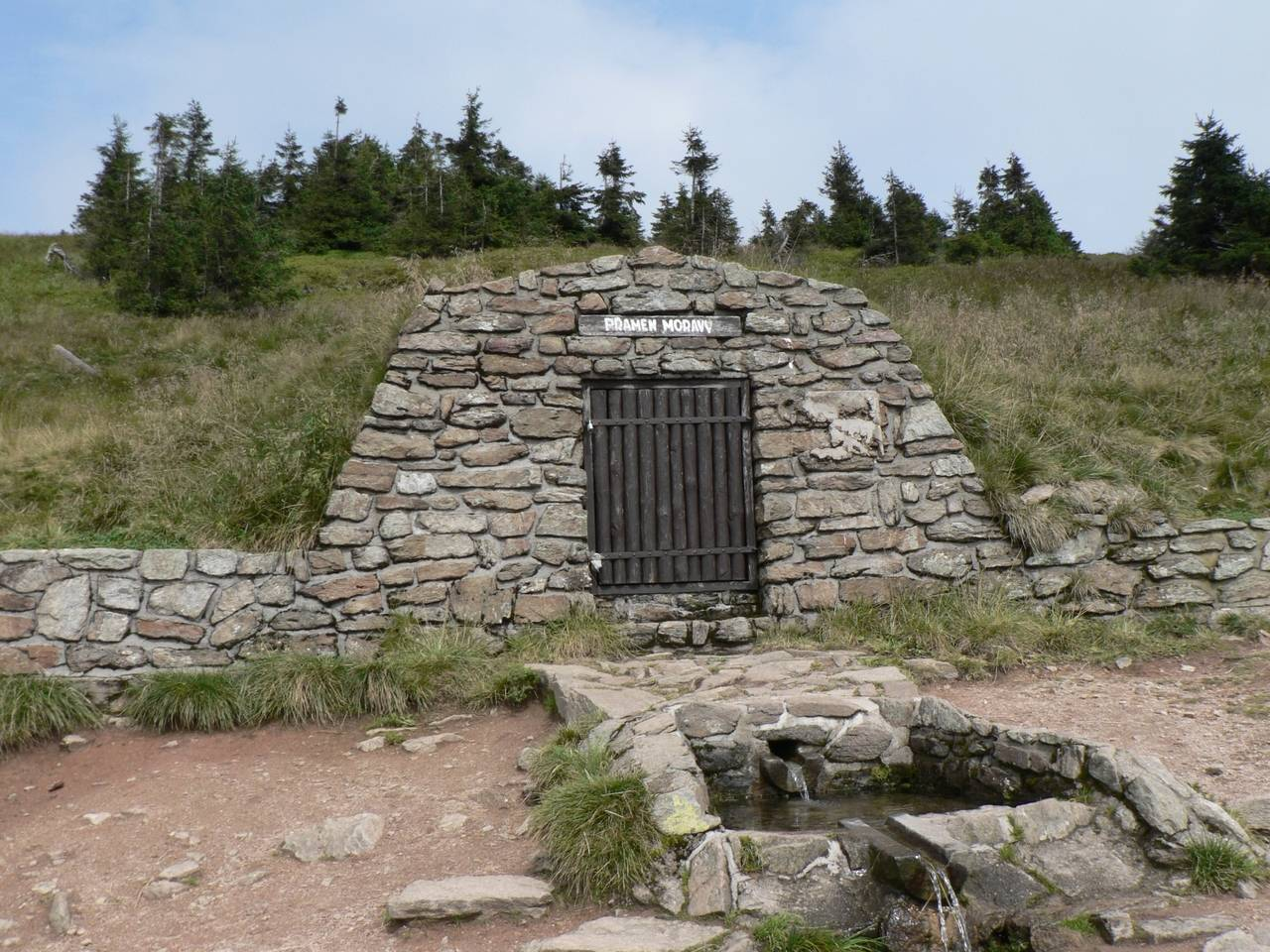
Spring of the river Morava below the top of Králický Snežník

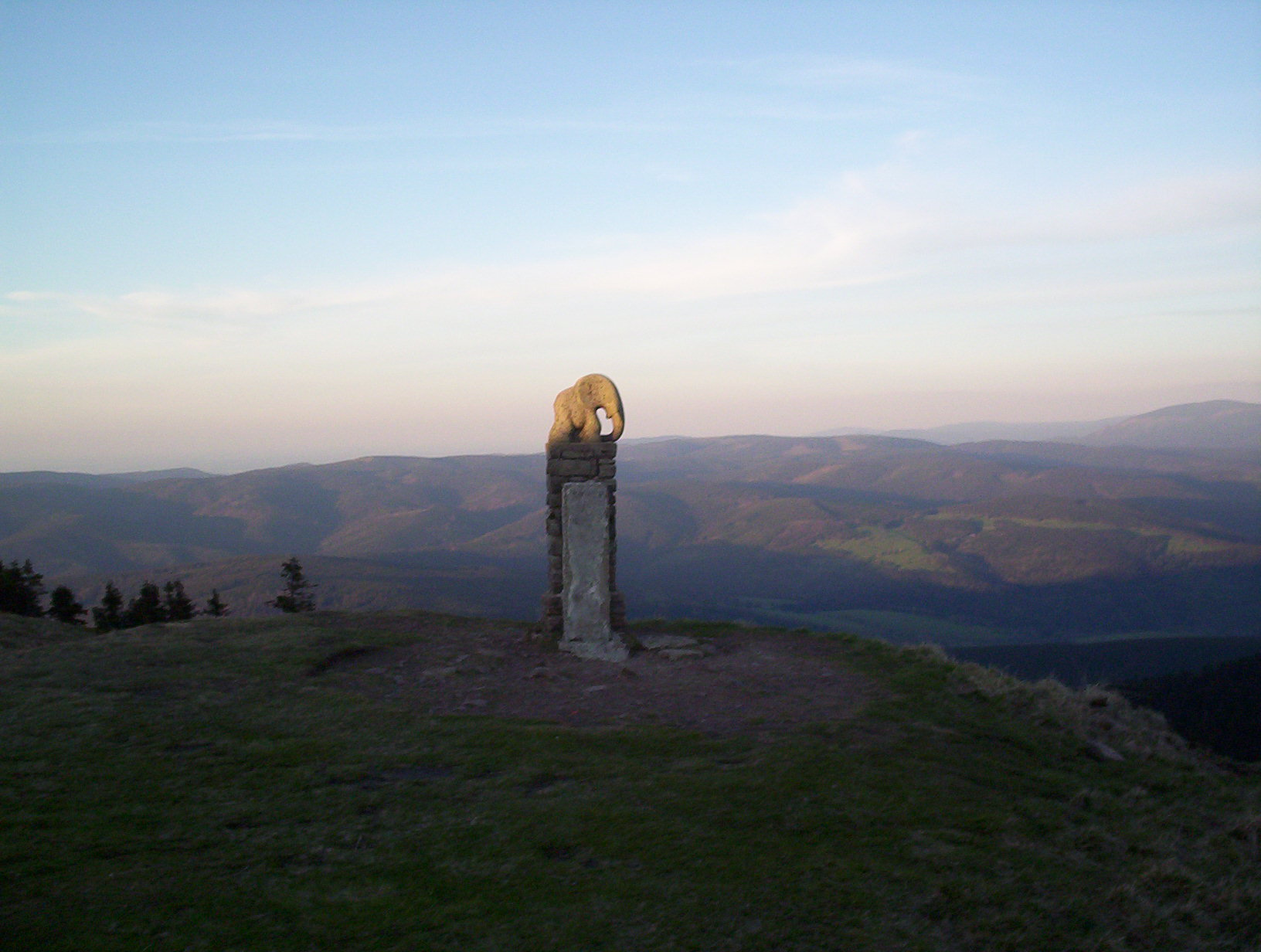
Statue of young elephant, a symbol of the mountain

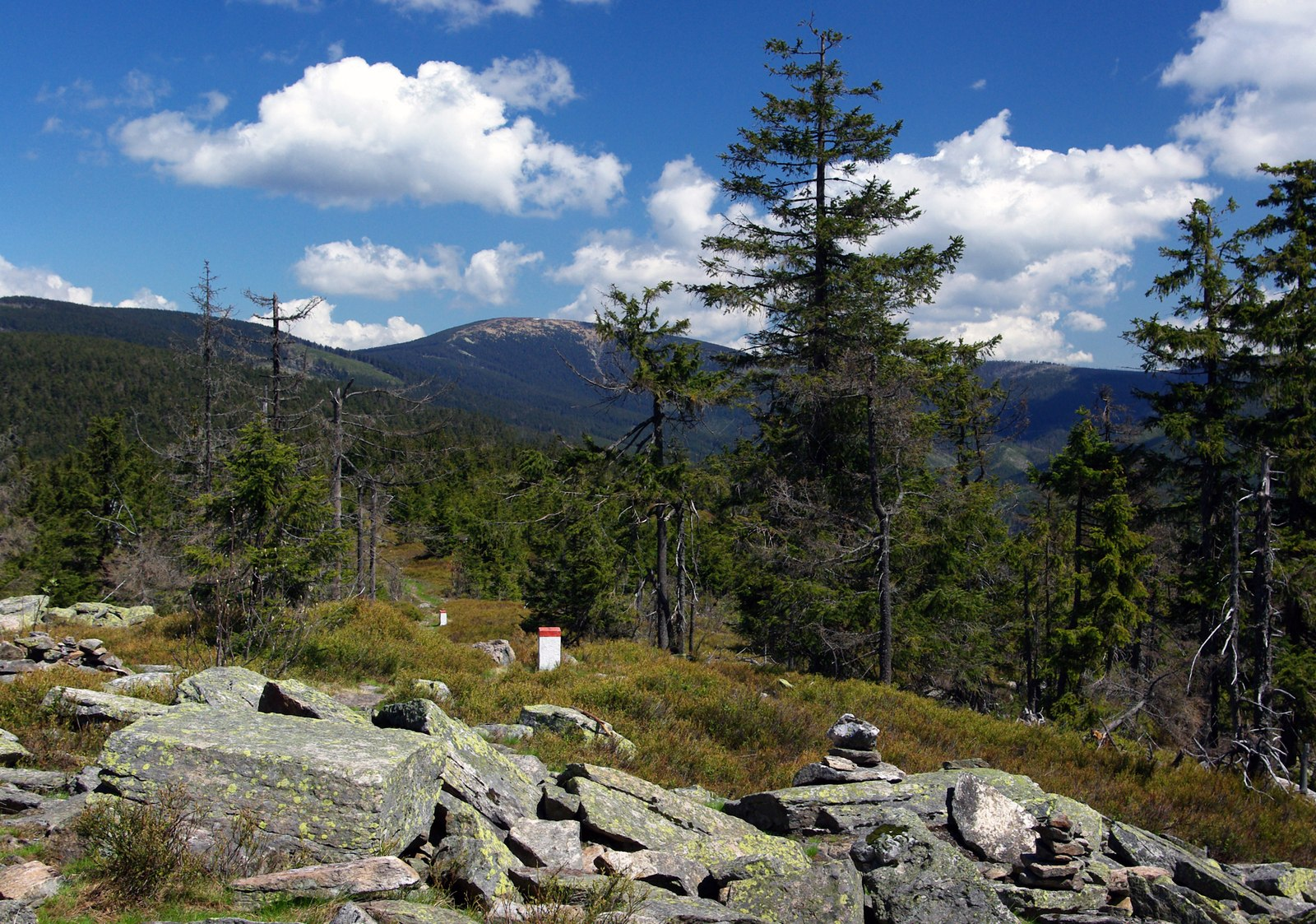
Králický Sněžník from south in May 2008

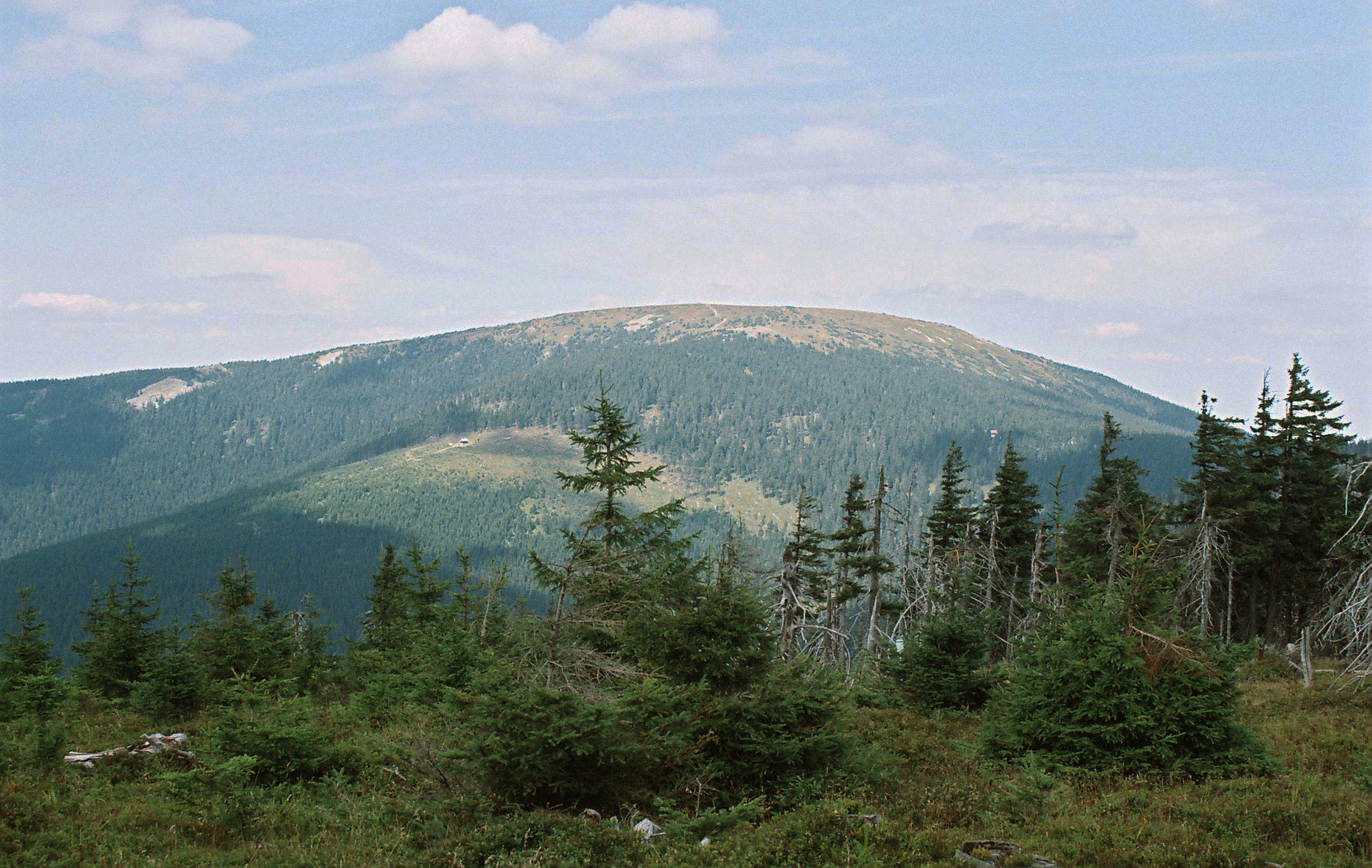
Králický Sněžník from south
