= Klepáč =

Peak in the Králický Sněžník Mountains range

- Trójmorski Wierch
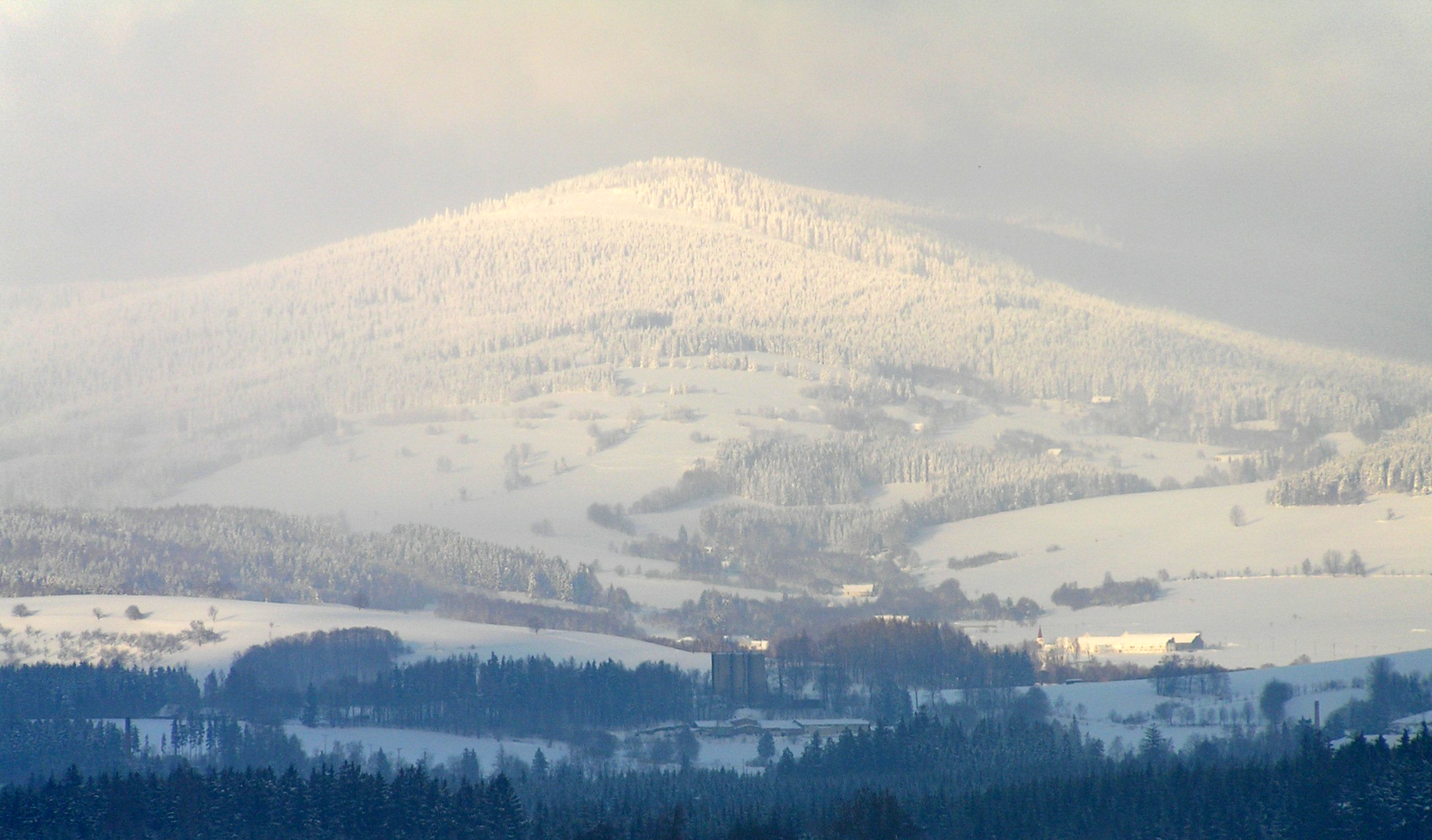
- View of the peak from the south

Highest point
- Elevation: 1,145 m (3,757 ft)
- Coordinates: 50°9′27″N 16°47′27″E

Geography
- Location within Czech Republic Location within Poland
- Location: Czech Republic / Poland
- Parent range: Králický Sněžník Mountains

Climbing
- First ascent: prehistoric
- Easiest route: Hike

Klepáč (Polish: Trójmorski Wierch (Polish pronunciation: [trujˈmɔrski ˈvjɛrx]), until 1946 Klepacz; German: Klappersteine) is a peak in the Králický Sněžník Mountains range. It lies on the Czech Republic–Poland border. It is a triple point of the European watershed.

== Names ==
The names Klepáč and Klepacz are based on the clapping sound made by loose stones scattered on the peak in high winds or upon stepping on them. In Czech, the mountain is also called Klepý. The current Polish name Trójmorski Wierch means 'three seas peak' and is derived from this hydrological feature. It was introduced in 1946.

== Geography ==
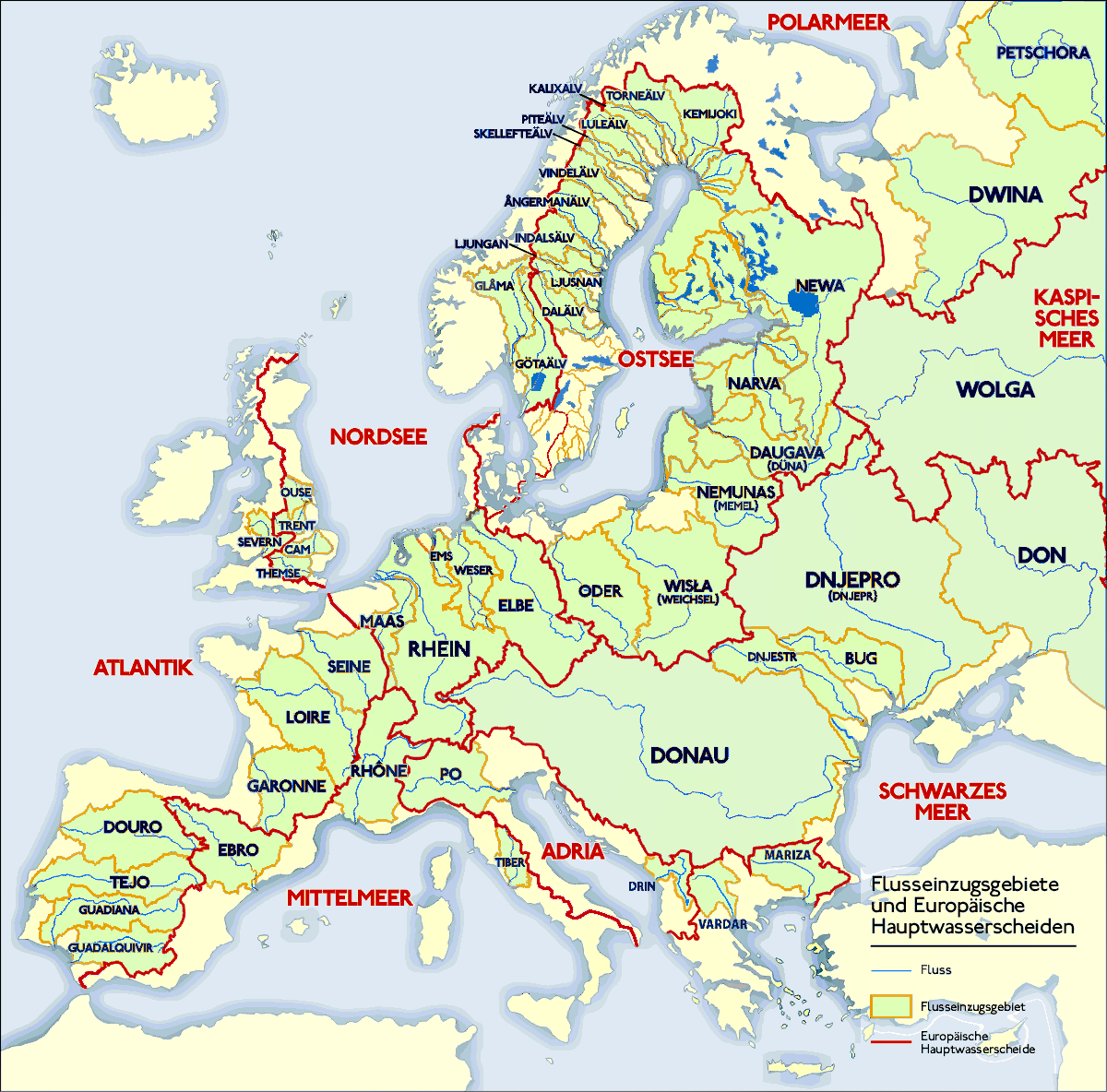
European watershed

Klepáč is 1,145 m (3,757 ft) high (1,144 m on the Czech side). It is located in the Králický Sněžník Mountains on the Czech Republic–Poland border, in the territories of Dolní Morava (Czech Republic) and Gmina Międzylesie (Poland). The mountain is a triple point of the European watershed. Water from the peak may flow either to the Baltic Sea via Eastern Neisse and Oder, to the Black Sea via Morava and Danube and to the North Sea via Orlice and Elbe.

== Tourism ==
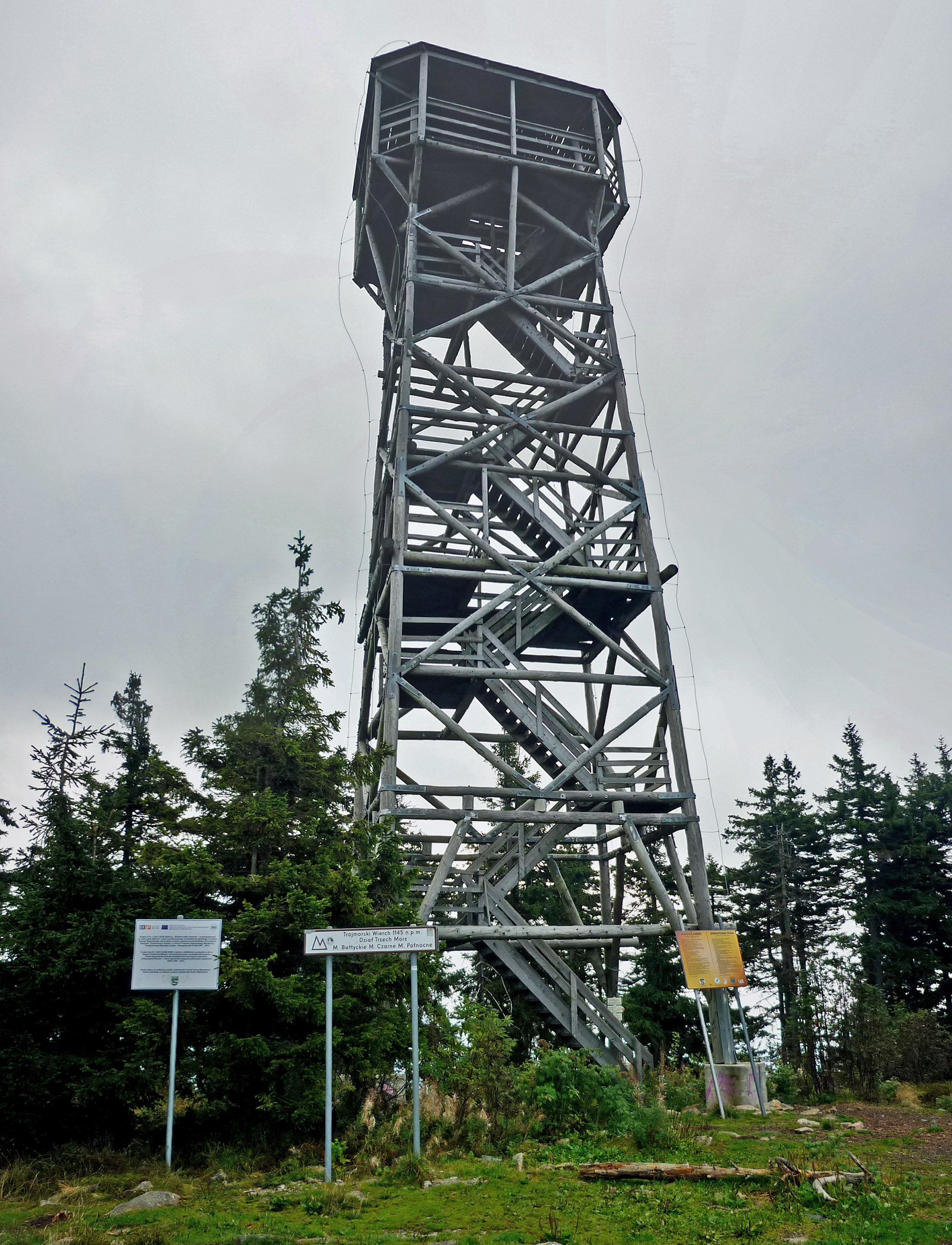
Observation tower on the summit

In 2009, Polish investors built a wooden observation tower on the summit. It is 28 m (92 ft) high and is accessible all year round. In the dry season, it is used by fire patrols to guard the surrounding forests.
