= Králický Sněžník Mountains =

Polish and Czech mountain range

- Śnieżnik Mountains
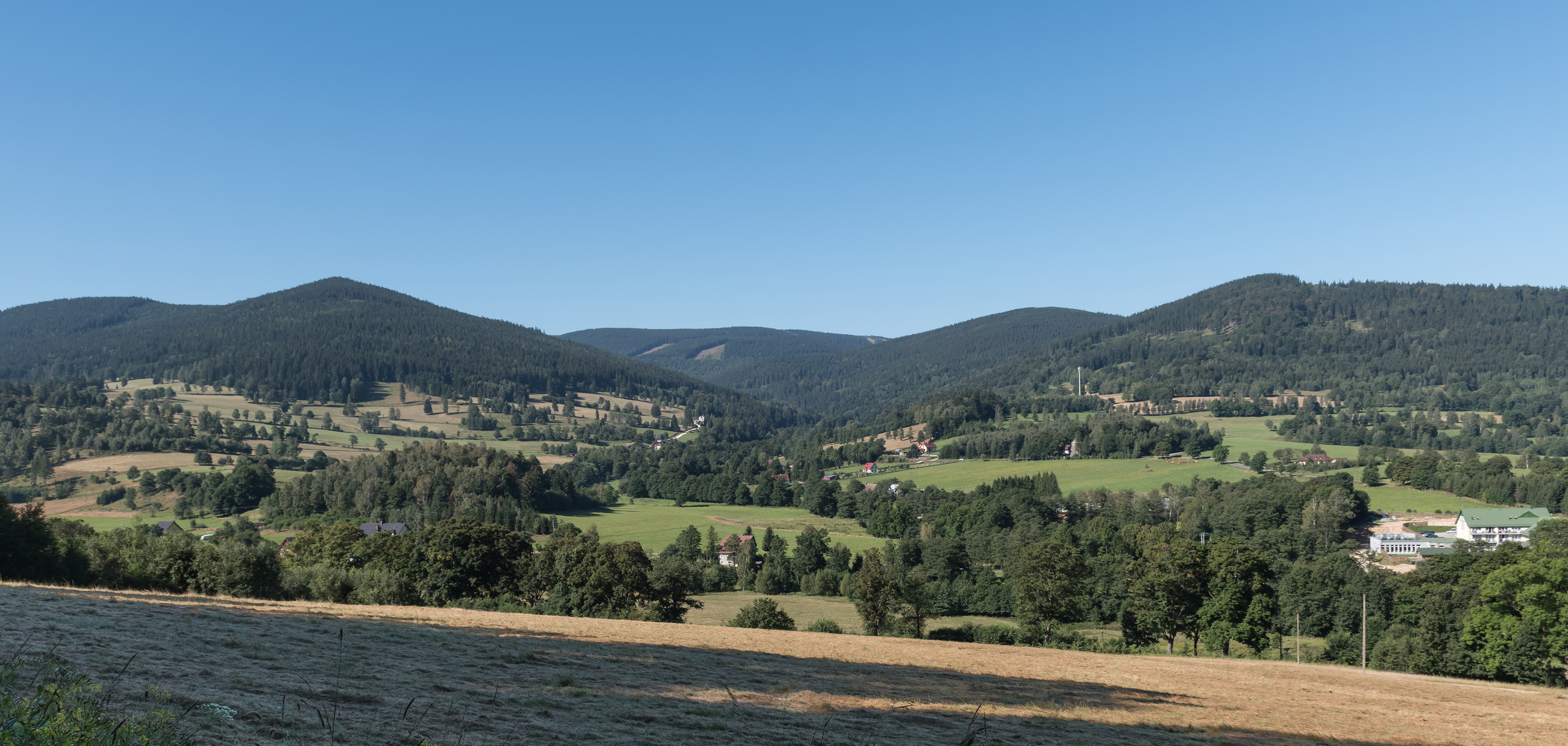
- Panorama of the Králický Sněžník Mountains

Highest point
- Peak: Králický Sněžník
- Elevation: 1,423 m (4,669 ft)

Dimensions
- Area: 276 km^{2} (107 mi^{2})

Geography
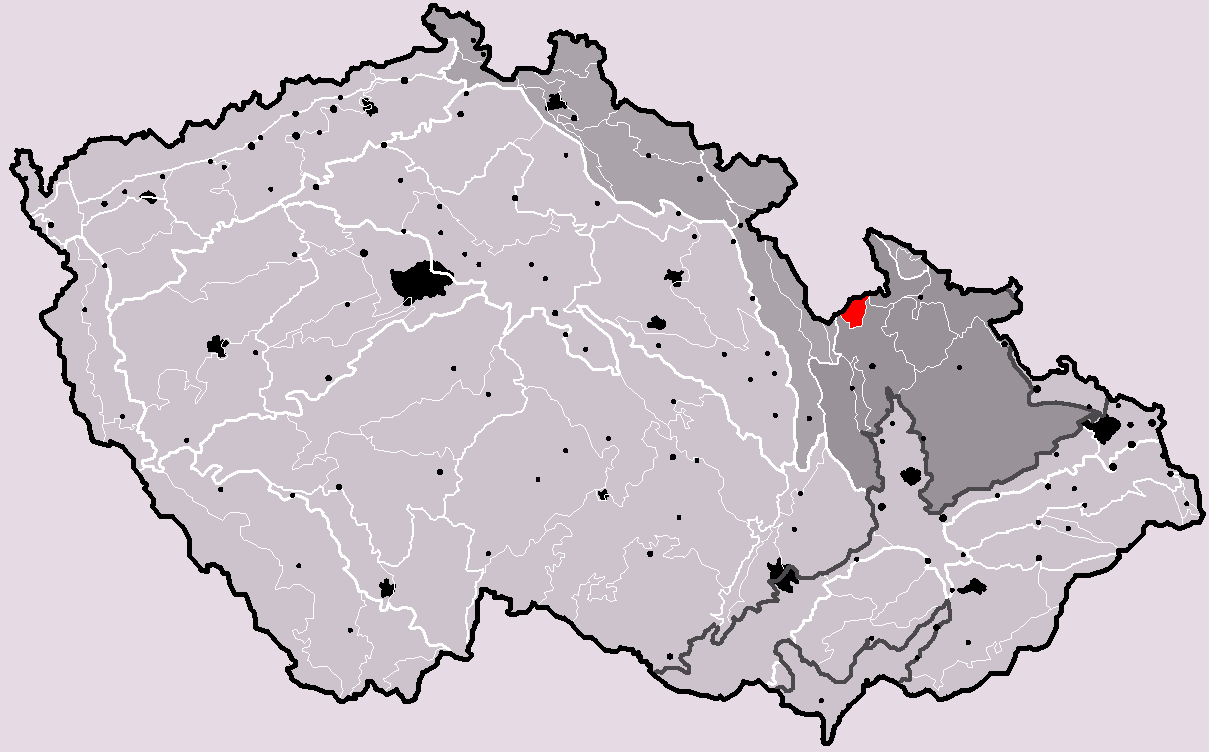
- Králický Sněžník Mountains in the geomorphological system of the Czech Republic
- Countries: Poland, Czech Republic
- Voivodeship/ Regions: Lower Silesian/ Olomouc, Pardubice
- Range coordinates: 50°12′N 16°48′E
- Parent range: Eastern Sudetes

Geology
- Rock type(s): Gneiss, schist, marble, dolomite

The Králický Sněžník Mountains (Polish: Masyw Śnieżnika; Czech: Králický Sněžník; German: Glatzer Schneegebirge) is a massif and mountain range in the Eastern Sudetes on the border of the Czech Republic and Poland.

== Geomorphology ==
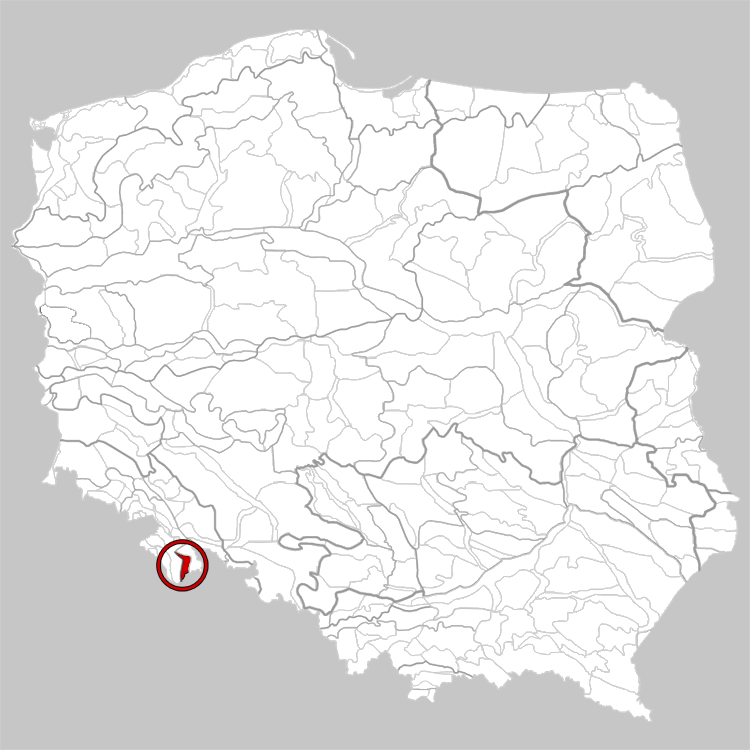
Králický Sněžník Mountains in the geomorphological system of Poland

The Králický Sněžník Mountains is a mesoregion of the Eastern Sudetes within the Sudetes in the Bohemian Massif. All the highest mountains are located close to the Czech–Polish border or on the Czech side. The largest mountains are:

- Králický Sněžník, 1,423 m (4,669 ft)
- Mały Śnieżnik, 1,327 m (4,354 ft)
- Sušina, 1,321 m (4,334 ft)
- Hraniční skály, 1,320 m (4,330 ft)
- Podbělka, 1,308 m (4,291 ft)
- Černá kupa, 1,295 m (4,249 ft)
- Stříbrnická, 1,251 m (4,104 ft)
- Babuše, 1,246 m (4,088 ft)
- Uhlisko, 1,241 m (4,072 ft)
- Slamník, 1,232 m (4,042 ft)

== Geography ==
The territory has an area of 276 square kilometres (107 sq mi), of which 200 km^{2} (77 sq mi) in Poland and 76 km^{2} (29 sq mi) in the Czech Republic.

Three main European watersheds pass through the Králický Sněžník Mountains and they meet at Klepáč mountain (1,145 m). Králický Sněžník forms an important hydrographic node, its territory belongs to three seas – the Black, North and Baltic Seas. The Morava River, which originates below the peak of Králický Sněžník, drains its waters into the Black Sea. The stream Lipkovský potok with its tributaries flows into the North Sea. The waters of the Eastern Neisse and its tributaries flow into the Baltic Sea.

Due to the terrain, there are no significant settlements here.

== Geology ==
The territory of the massif is mainly formed by metamorphosed rocks – gneiss and schist. Other rocks that occur here are crystalline limestone and dolomite, amphibole schist, quartzite and quartzite schist. Marble, serpentinite and eclogite can be found in small quantities. The Sněžník marble is a decorative stone that has been used in numerous architectural monuments throughout the country.

== Protection of nature ==
On the Polish side the mountain range is largely covered by the protected area called Śnieżnik Landscape Park. On the Czech side, an area of 17.08 km^{2} (6.59 sq mi) is protected as a national nature reserve.
