= Moravia =

Historical region in the Czech Republic

Moravia Morava
- Historical land
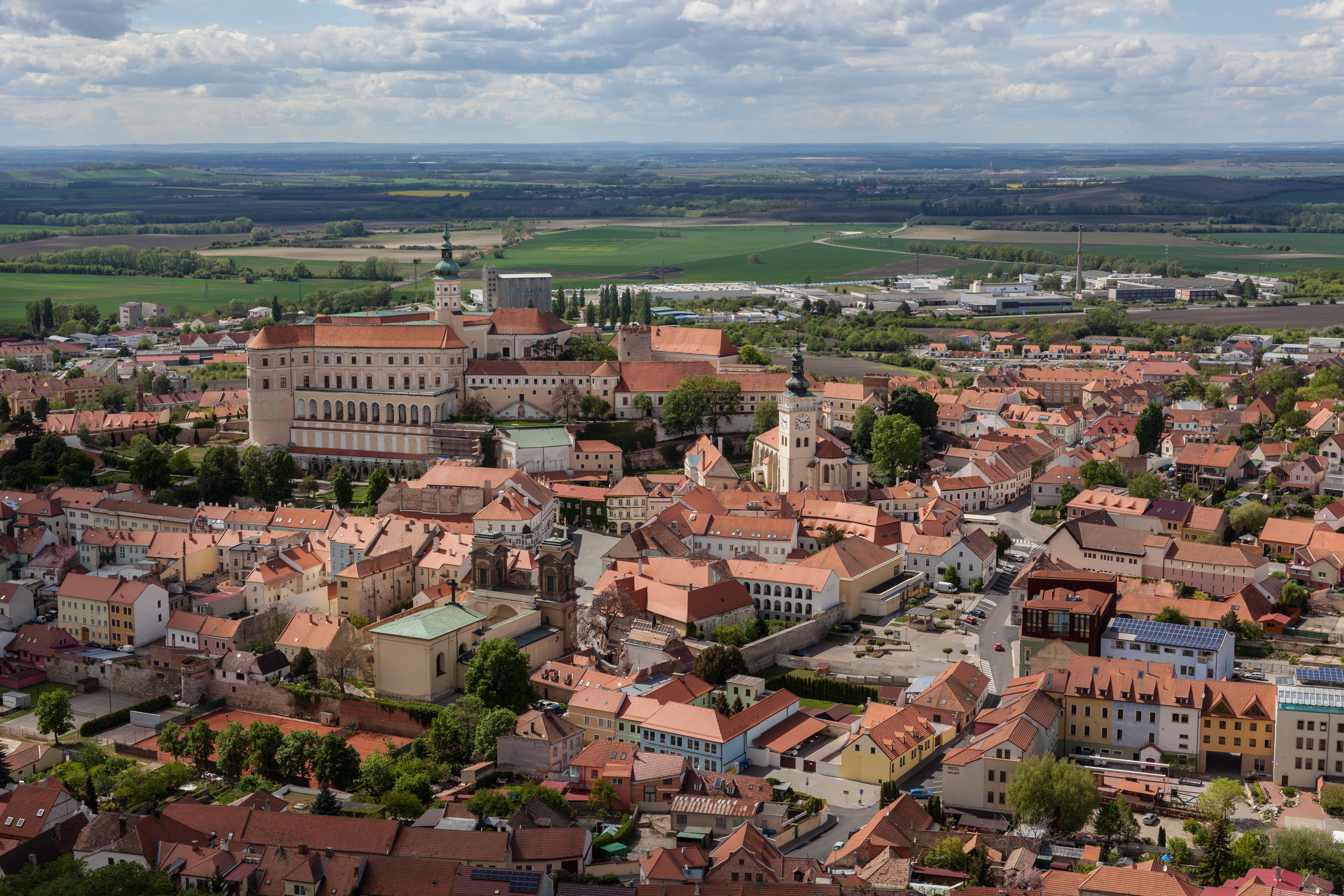
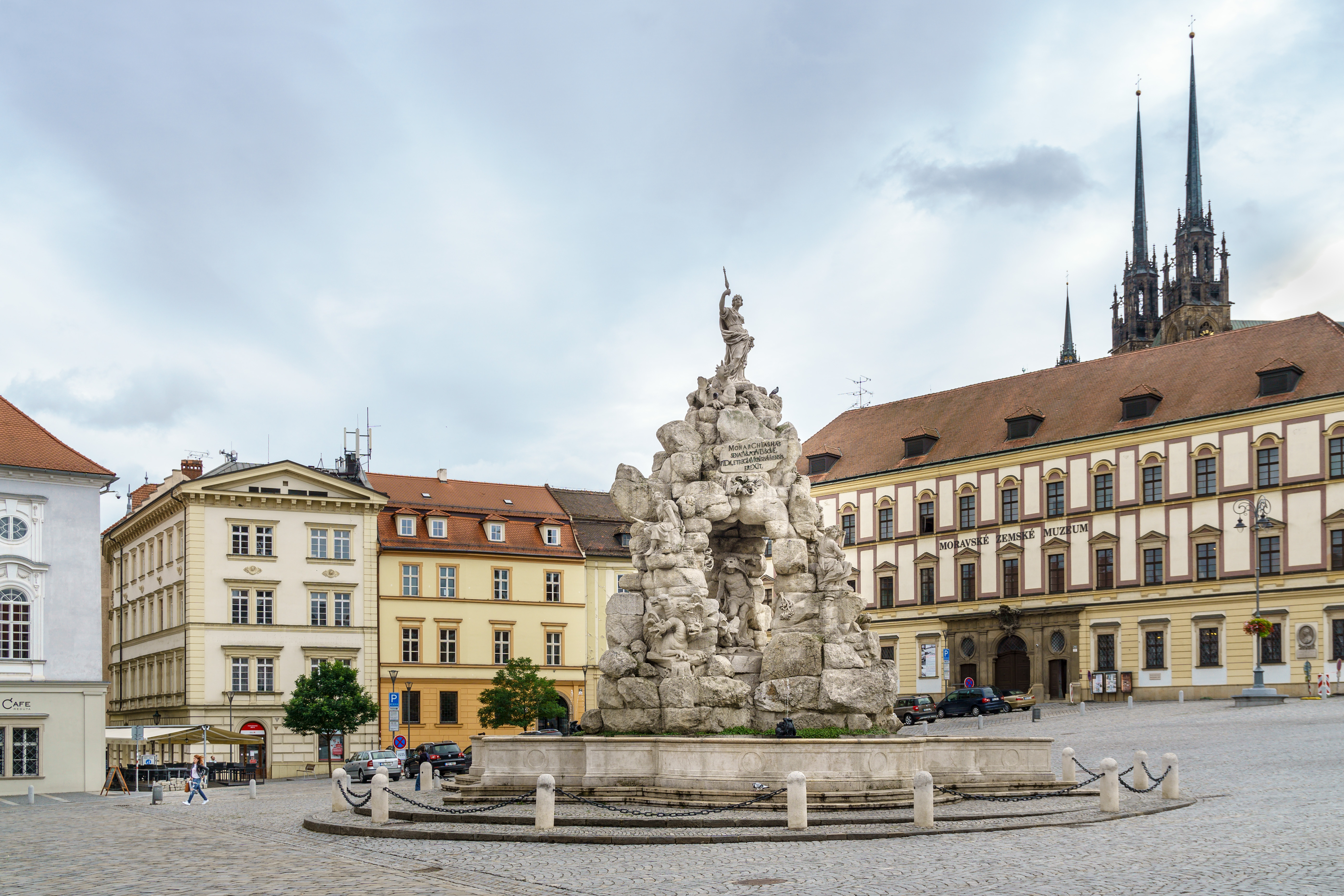
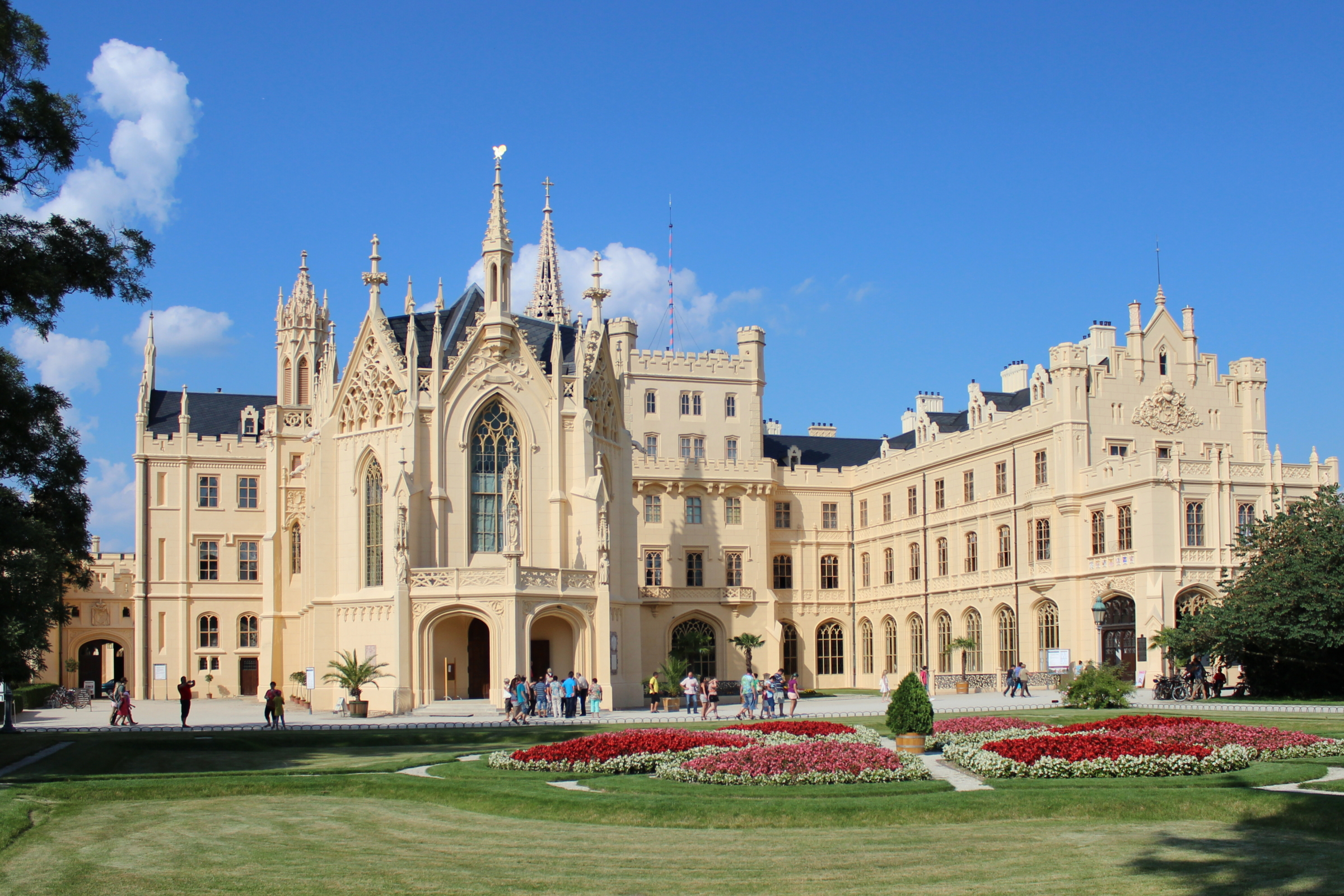
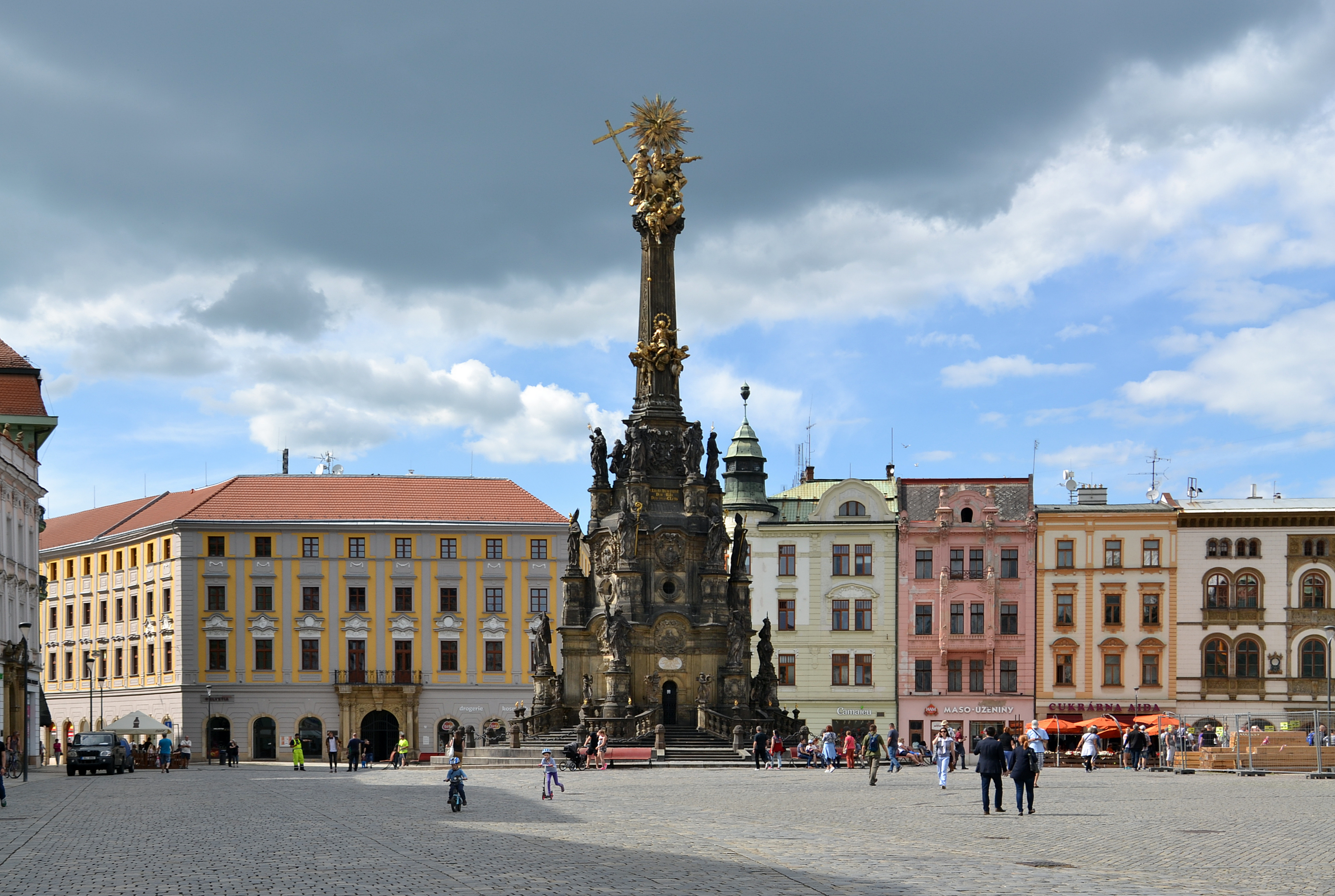
- From top, left to right: Mikulov; Brno; Lednice Castle; Olomouc

- Flag Coat of arms

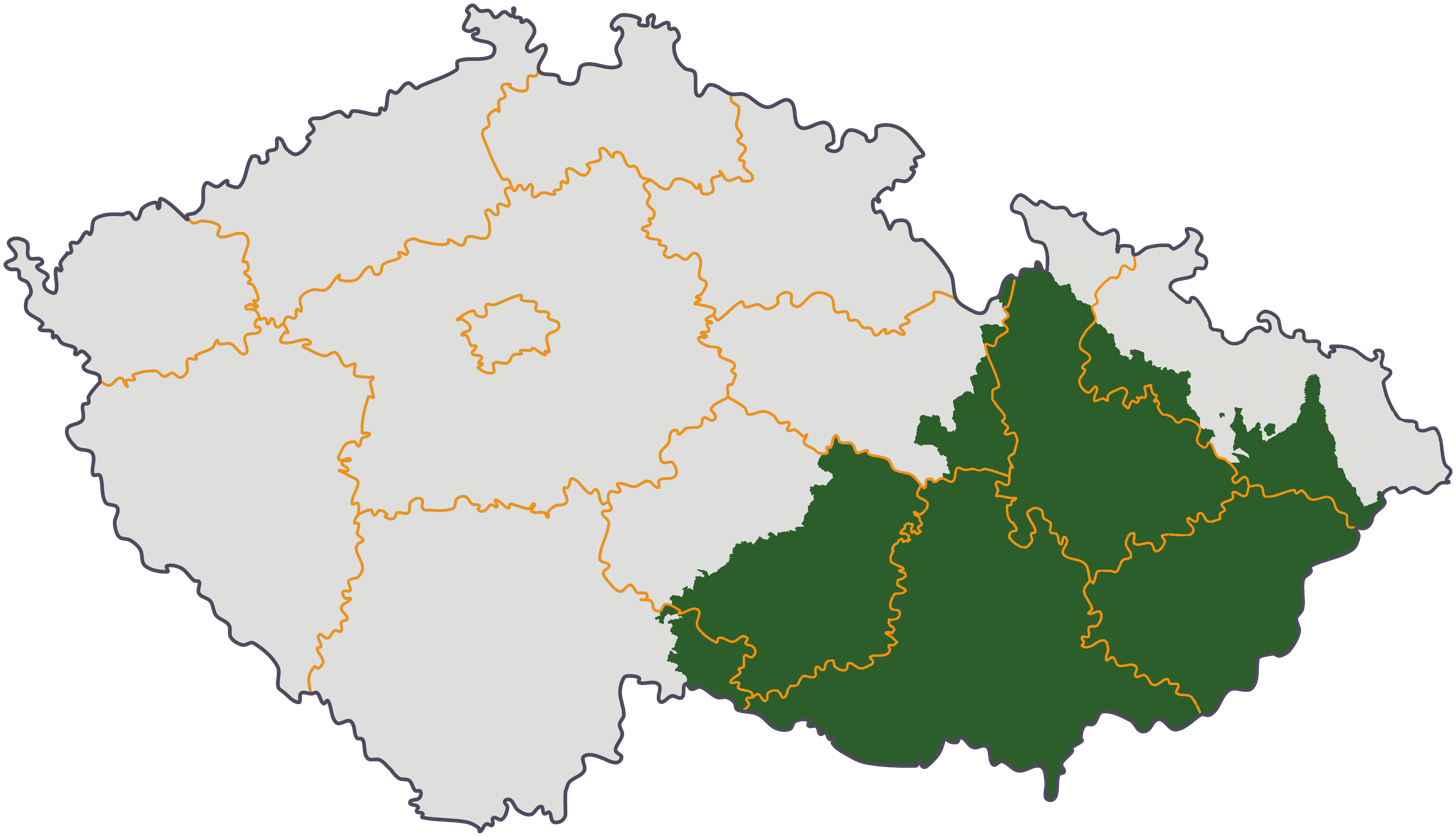
- Moravia (green) overlapped with the current regions of the Czech Republic

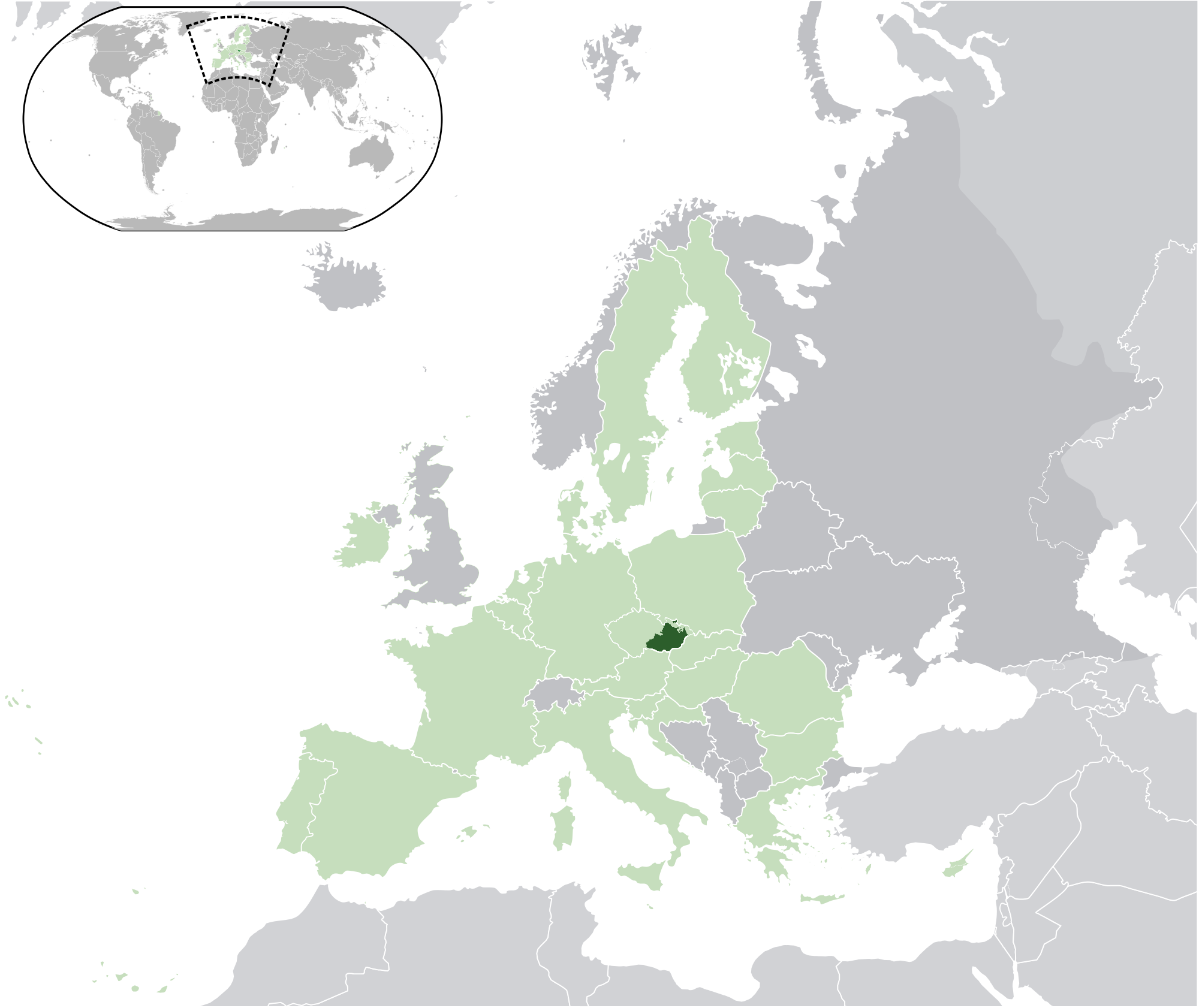
- Location of Moravia in the European Union
- Coordinates: 49.5°N 17°E
- Country: Czech Republic
- First mentioned: 822
- Consolidated: 833
- Former capital: Brno (1641–1948); Brno, Olomouc (until 1641), Velingrad (9th century)
- Major cities: Brno, Ostrava, Olomouc, Zlín, Jihlava, Znojmo

Area
  - Total: 22,348.87 km^{2} (8,628.95 sq mi)

Population
  - Total: 3,000,000
  - Density: 130/km^{2} (350/sq mi)
- Demonym: Moravian
- Time zone: UTC+1 (CET)
  - Summer (DST): UTC+2 (CEST)
- Primary airport: Brno-Tuřany Airport

Moravia (Note: /məˈreɪviə/ mə-RAY-vee-ə, UK also /mɒˈ-/ morr-AY-, US also /mɔːˈ-, moʊˈ-/ mor-AY-, moh-RAY-.) (Czech: Morava, (Note: Czech pronunciation: [ˈmorava]) German: Mähren) is a historical region in the east of the Czech Republic and one of three historical Czech lands, with Bohemia and Czech Silesia.

The medieval and early modern Margraviate of Moravia was a crown land of the Lands of the Bohemian Crown from 1348 to 1918, an imperial state of the Holy Roman Empire from 1004 to 1806, a crown land of the Austrian Empire from 1804 to 1867, and a part of Austria-Hungary from 1867 to 1918. Moravia was one of the five lands of Czechoslovakia founded in 1918. In 1928 it was merged with Czech Silesia, and then dissolved in 1948 during the abolition of the land system following the communist coup d'état.

Its area of 22,623.41 km^{2} (Note: Including Moravian enclaves in Silesia.) is home to about 3.0 million of the Czech Republic's 10.9 million inhabitants. The people are historically named Moravians, a subgroup of Czechs, the other group being called Bohemians. The land takes its name from the Morava river, which runs from its north to south, being its principal watercourse. Moravia's largest city and historical capital is Brno. Before being sacked by the Swedish army during the Thirty Years' War, Olomouc served as the Moravian capital, and it is still the seat of the Archdiocese of Olomouc. Until the expulsions after 1945, significant parts of Moravia were German speaking.

== Toponymy ==
The region and former margraviate of Moravia, Morava, in Czech, is named after its principal river Morava.

The German name for Moravia is Mähren, from the river's German name March. This could have a different etymology, as march is a term used in the medieval times for an outlying territory, a border or a frontier (cf. English march). In Latin, the name Moravia was used.

== Geography ==
Moravia occupies most of the eastern part of the Czech Republic. Moravian territory is naturally strongly determined, in fact, as the Morava river basin, with strong effect of mountains in the west (de facto main European continental divide) and partly in the east, where all the rivers rise.

Moravia occupies an exceptional position in Central Europe. All the highlands in the west and east of this part of Europe run west–east, and therefore form a kind of filter, making north–south or south–north movement more difficult. Only Moravia with the depression of the westernmost Outer Subcarpathia, 14–40 kilometers (9–25 mi) wide, between the Bohemian Massif and the Outer Western Carpathians, provides a comfortable connection between the Danubian and Polish regions, and this area is thus of great importance in terms of the possible migration routes of large mammals – both as regards periodically recurring seasonal migrations triggered by climatic oscillations in the prehistory, when permanent settlement started.

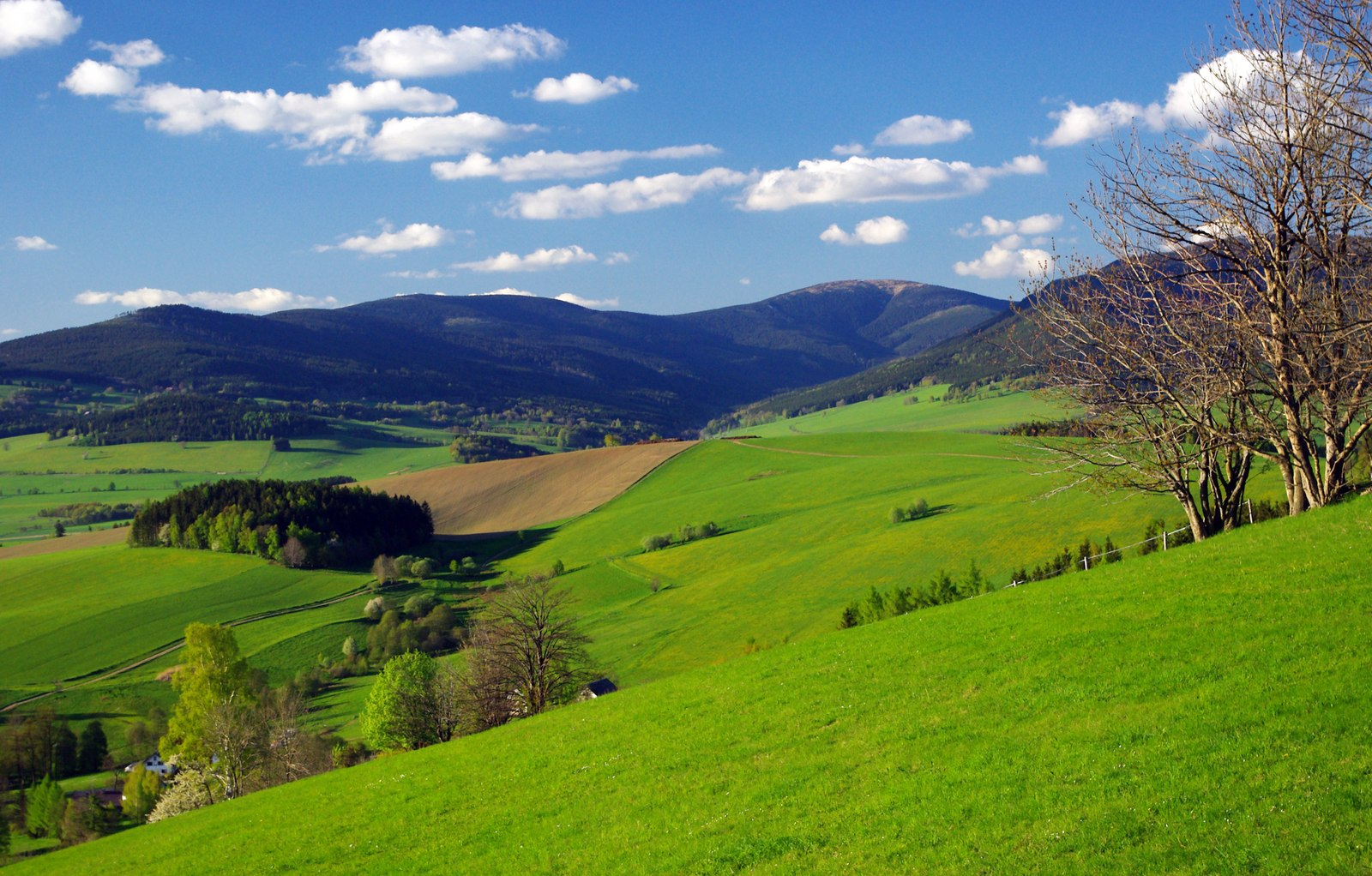
Rolling hills of the Králický Sněžník massif, Horní Morava, near the border with Bohemia

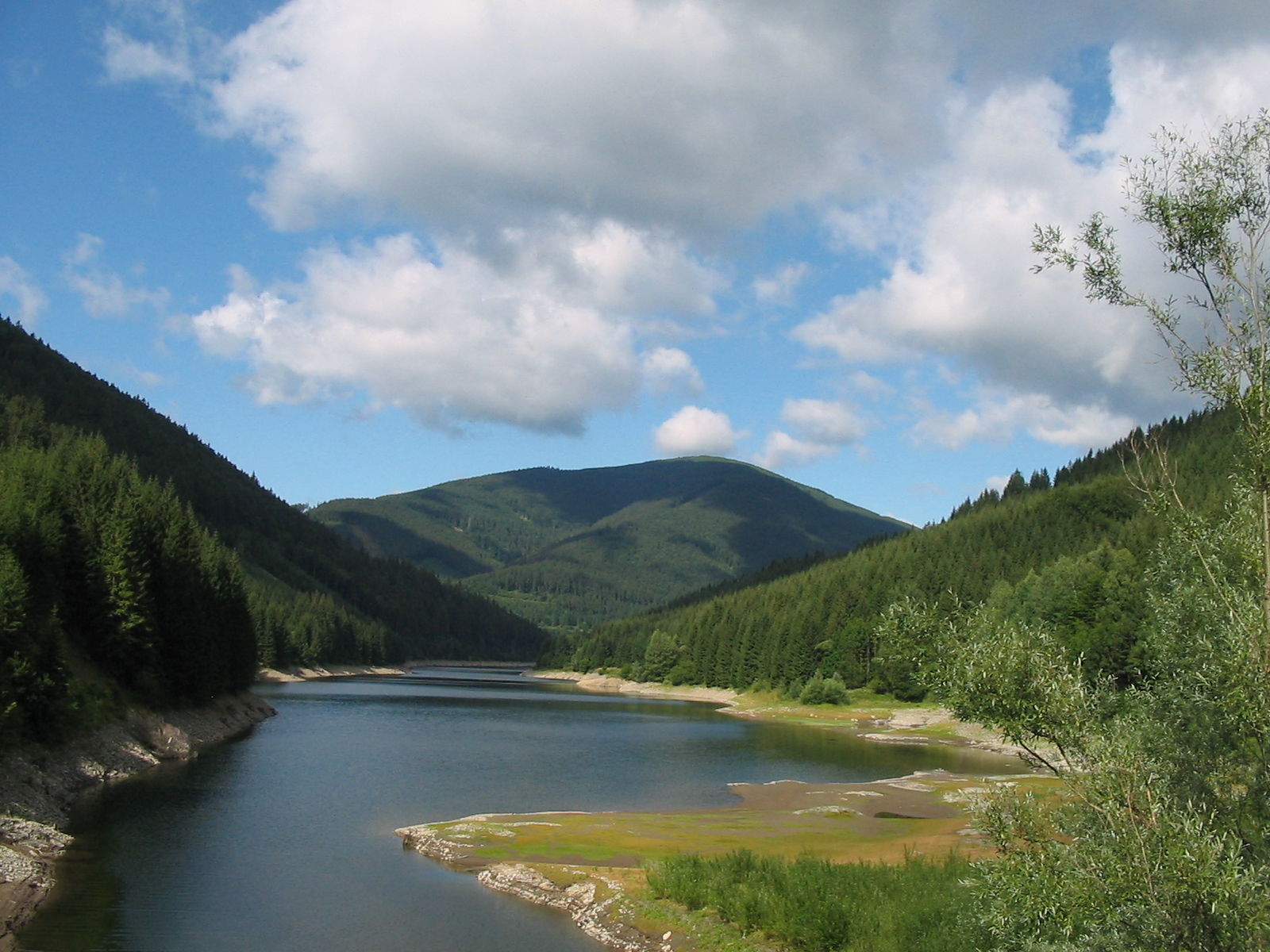
Šance Reservoir on the Ostravice River in the Moravian-Silesian Beskids; the river forms the border with Silesia.

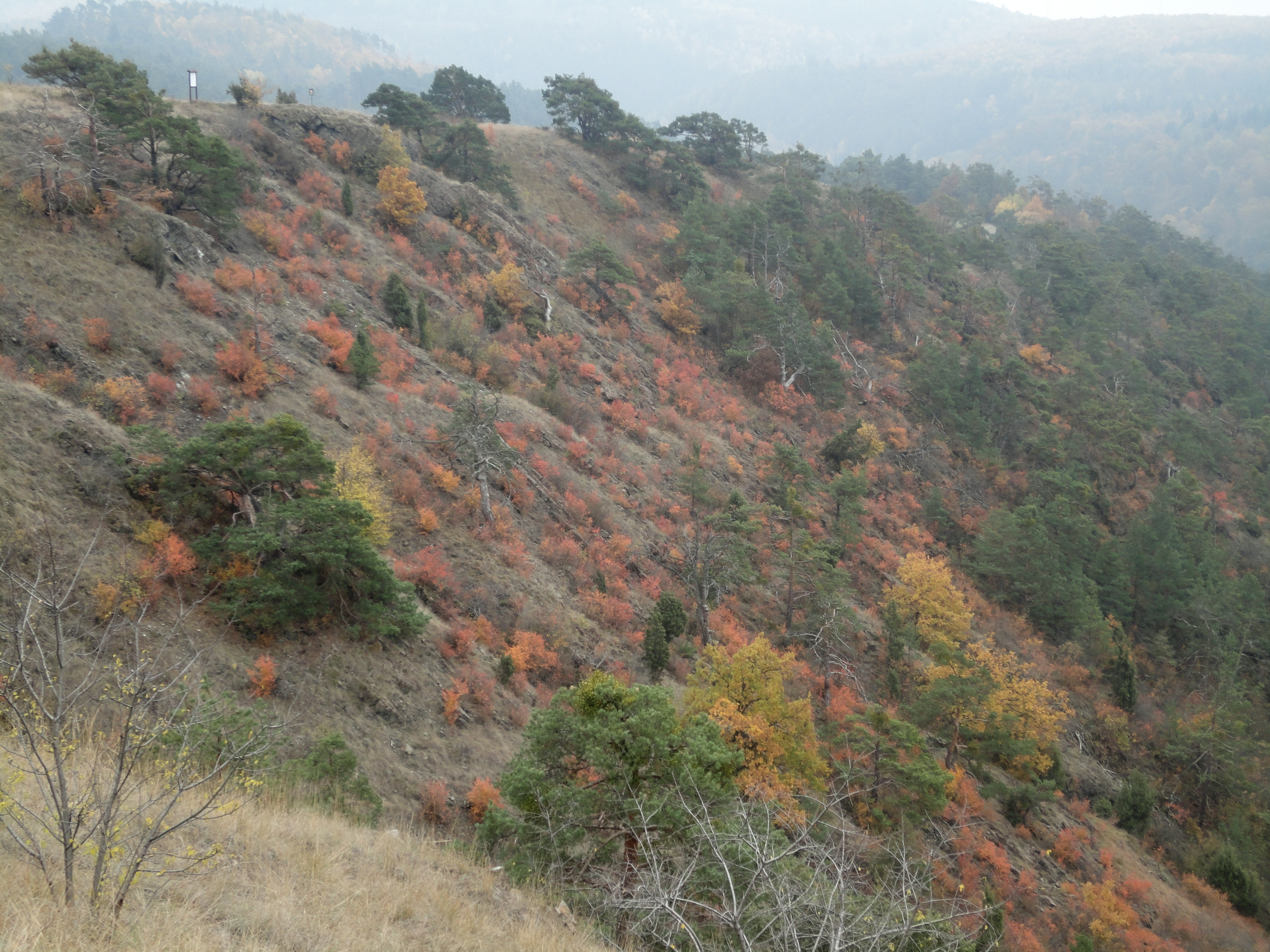
Steppe landscape near Mohelno

Moravia borders Bohemia in the west, Lower Austria in the southwest, Slovakia in the southeast, Poland for a short distance in the north, and Czech Silesia in the northeast. Its natural boundary is formed by the Sudetes mountains in the north, the Carpathians in the east and the Bohemian-Moravian Highlands in the west (the border runs from Králický Sněžník in the north, over Suchý vrch, across the Upper Svratka Highlands and Javořice Highlands to a tripoint near Slavonice in the south). The Thaya river meanders along the border with Austria, and the tripoint of Moravia, Austria and Slovakia is at the confluence of the Thaya and Morava rivers. The northeast border with Silesia runs partly along the Moravice, Oder and Ostravice rivers. Between 1782 and 1850, Moravia (also thus known as Moravia-Silesia) also included a small portion of the former province of Silesia – the Austrian Silesia. (When Frederick the Great annexed most of ancient Silesia (the land of upper and middle Oder river) to Prussia, Silesia's southernmost part remained with the Habsburgs.)

Today Moravia includes the South Moravian and Zlín regions, the vast majority of the Olomouc Region, the southeastern half of the Vysočina Region and parts of the Moravian-Silesian, Pardubice and South Bohemian regions.

Geologically, Moravia covers an area between the Bohemian Massif and the Carpathians (from northwest to southeast), and between the Danube basin and the North European Plain (from south to northeast). Its core geomorphological features are three wide valleys, namely the Dyje-Svratka Valley (Dyjsko-svratecký úval), the Upper Morava Valley (Hornomoravský úval) and the Lower Morava Valley (Dolnomoravský úval). The first two form the westernmost part of the Outer Subcarpathia; the last is the northernmost part of the Vienna Basin. The valleys surround the low range of Central Moravian Carpathians. The highest mountains of Moravia are situated on its northern border in Hrubý Jeseník; the highest peak is Praděd (1491 m). Second highest is the massif of Králický Sněžník (1424 m) the third are the Moravian-Silesian Beskids at the extreme east, with Smrk (1278 m), and then south from here Javorníky (1072). The White Carpathians along the southeastern border rise up to 970 m at Velká Javořina. The Bohemian-Moravian Highlands on the west reach 837 m at Javořice.

The region's border closely follows the watershed of the Morava river, so almost the entire area is drained by that single stream. Easily the Morava's biggest tributaries are Thaya (Dyje) from the right (or west) and Bečva (east). The Morava and the Thaya meet at the southernmost and lowest (148 m) point of Moravia. Small peripheral parts of Moravia belong to the catchment areas of Elbe, Váh and especially Oder (the northeast). The watershed line running along Moravia's border from west to north and east is part of the European Watershed. For centuries, there have been plans to build a waterway across Moravia to join the Danube and Oder river systems, using the natural route through the Moravian Gate.

== History ==
=== Pre-history ===
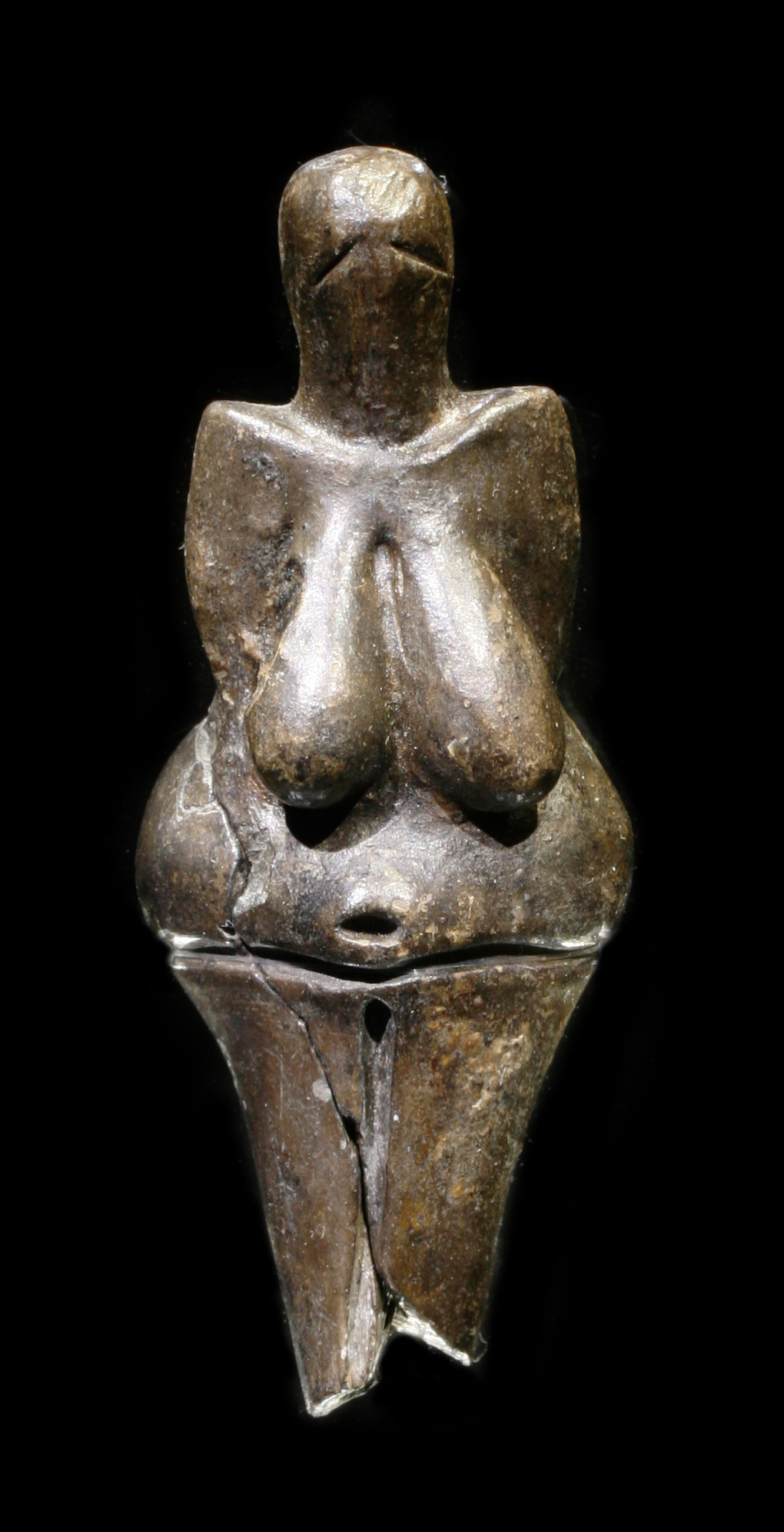
Venus of Dolní Věstonice, the oldest surviving ceramic figurine in the world

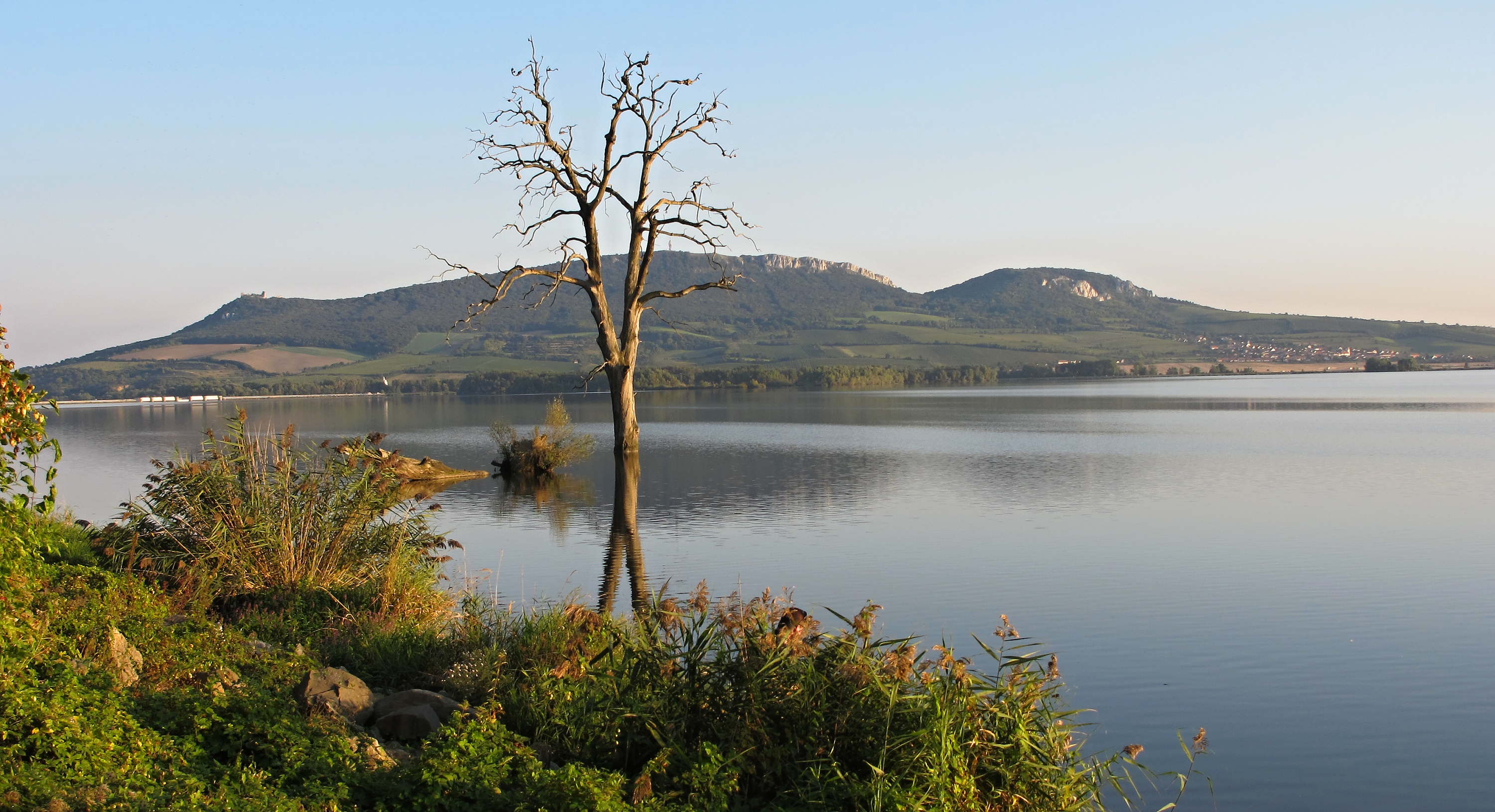
Pálava mountains with Věstonice Reservoir, area of palaeolithic settlement

Evidence of the presence of members of the human genus, Homo, dates back more than 600,000 years in the paleontological area of Stránská skála.

Attracted by suitable living conditions, early modern humans had settled in the region by the Paleolithic period. The Předmostí u Přerova archaeological (Cro-Magnon) site in Moravia is dated to between 27,000 and 24,000 years old. Caves in Moravian Karst were used by mammoth hunters. Venus of Dolní Věstonice, the oldest ceramic figure in the world, was found in the excavation of Dolní Věstonice by Karel Absolon. In November 2024 a new discovery was made on the outskirts of Brno, where bones of at least three mammoths were found along with other animals and human stone tools dating back 15,000 years.

=== Bronze Age ===
During the Bronze Age, people of various cultures settled in Moravia. Notably the Nitra culture which emerged from the tradition of the Neolithic Corded Ware culture and was spread in western Slovakia (hence the name, derived from Slovak river Nitra), eastern Moravia and southern Poland. The largest burial site (400 graves) of Nitra culture in Moravia was discovered in Holešov in the 1960s. The most recent discovery unearthed two settlements and two burial grounds (with total 130 graves) near Olomouc, one of them of the Nitra culture dating between the years 2100–1800 BC and was published in October 2024. This discovery adds to other Bronze Age discoveries, such as a sword found near the city of Přerov, dubbed 'the Excalibur of the Late Bronze Age'.

=== Roman era ===
Around 60 BC, the Celtic Volcae people withdrew from the region and were succeeded by the Germanic Quadi. Some of the events of the Marcomannic Wars took place in Moravia in AD 169–180. After the war exposed the weakness of Rome's northern frontier, half of the Roman legions (16 out of 33) were stationed along the Danube. In response to increasing numbers of Germanic settlers in frontier regions like Pannonia, Dacia, Rome established two new frontier provinces on the left shore of the Danube, Marcomannia and Sarmatia, including today's Moravia and western Slovakia.

In the 2nd century AD, a Roman fortress stood on the vineyards hill known as German: Burgstall and Czech: Hradisko (lit. 'hillfort'), situated above the former village Mušov and above today's beach resort at Pasohlávky. During the reign of the Emperor Marcus Aurelius, the 10th Legion was assigned to control the Germanic tribes who had been defeated in the Marcomannic Wars. In 1927, the archaeologist Gnirs, with the support of president Tomáš Garrigue Masaryk, began research on the site, located 80km from Vindobona and 22km to the south of Brno. The researchers found remnants of two masonry buildings, a praetorium and a balneum ('bath'), including a hypocaustum. The discovery of bricks with the stamp of the Legio X Gemina and coins from the period of the emperors Antoninus Pius, Marcus Aurelius and Commodus facilitated dating of the locality.

=== Ancient Moravia ===
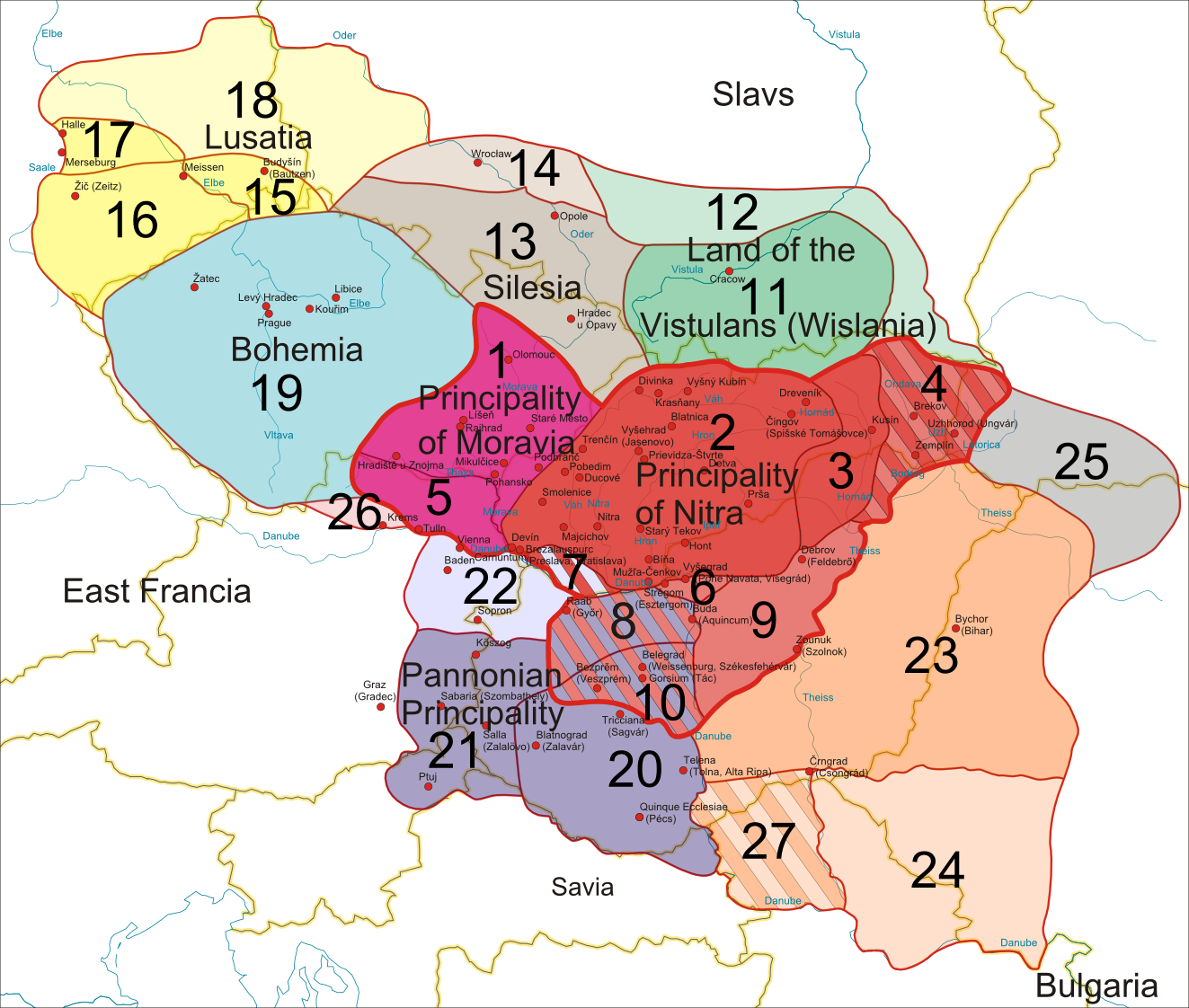
Territory of Great Moravia in the 9th century: area ruled by Rastislav (846–870) map marks the greatest territorial extent during the reign of Svatopluk I (871–894), violet core is origin of Moravia.

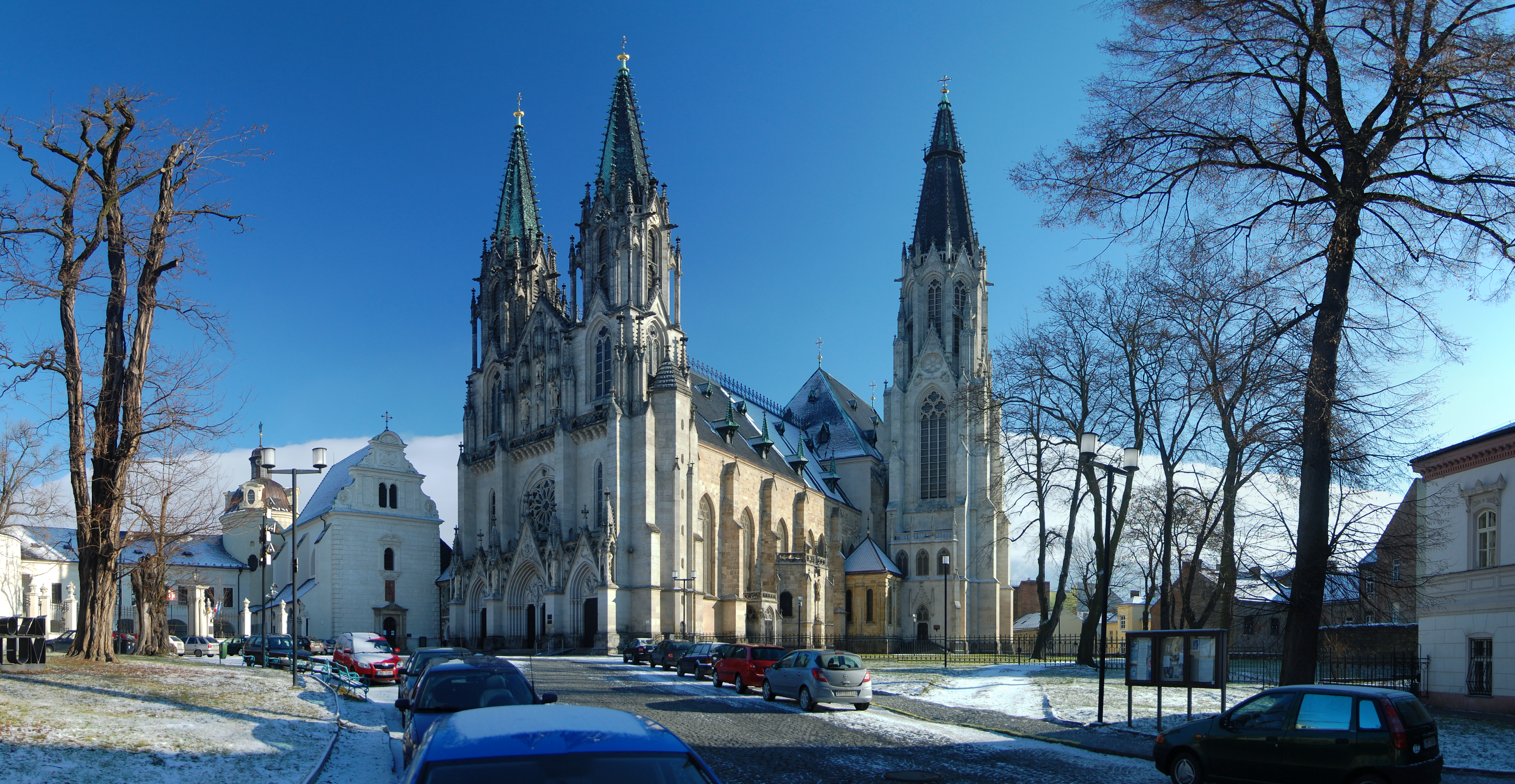
Saint Wenceslas Cathedral in Olomouc, seat of bishops of Olomouc since the 10th century and the current seat of the Archbishopric of Olomouc, the Metropolitan archdiocese of Moravia

A variety of Germanic and major Slavic tribes crossed through Moravia during the Migration Period before Slavs established themselves in the 6th century AD. At the end of the 8th century, the Moravian Principality came into being in present-day south-eastern Moravia, Záhorie in south-western Slovakia and parts of Lower Austria. In 833 AD, this became the state of Great Moravia with the conquest of the Principality of Nitra (present-day Slovakia). Their first king was Mojmír I (ruled 830–846). Louis the German invaded Moravia and replaced Mojmír I with his nephew Rastiz who became St. Rastislav. St. Rastislav (846–870) tried to emancipate his land from the Carolingian influence, so he sent envoys to Rome to get missionaries to come. When Rome refused he turned to Constantinople to the Byzantine emperor Michael. The result was the mission of Saints Cyril and Methodius who translated liturgical books into Slavonic, which had lately been elevated by the pope to the same level as Latin and Greek. Methodius became the first Moravian archbishop, the first archbishop in Slavic world, but after his death the German influence again prevailed and the disciples of Methodius were forced to flee. Great Moravia reached its greatest territorial extent in the 890s under Svatopluk I. At this time, the empire encompassed the territory of the present-day Czech Republic and Slovakia, the western part of present Hungary (Pannonia), as well as Lusatia in present-day Germany and Silesia and the upper Vistula basin in southern Poland. After Svatopluk's death in 895, the Bohemian princes defected to become vassals of the East Frankish ruler Arnulf of Carinthia, and the Moravian state ceased to exist after being overrun by invading Magyars in 907.

=== Union with Bohemia ===
Following the defeat of the Magyars by Emperor Otto I at the Battle of Lechfeld in 955, Otto's ally Boleslaus I, the Přemyslid ruler of Bohemia, took control over Moravia. Bolesław I Chrobry of Poland annexed Moravia in 999, and ruled it until 1019, (Note: The exact dating of the conquest of Moravia by Bohemian dukes is uncertain. Czech and some Slovak historiographers suggest the year 1019, while Polish, German and other Slovak historians suggest 1029, during the rule of Boleslaus' son, Mieszko II Lambert.) when the Přemyslid prince Bretislaus recaptured it. Upon his father's death in 1034, Bretislaus became the ruler of Bohemia. In 1055, he decreed that Bohemia and Moravia would be inherited together by primogeniture, although he also provided that his younger sons should govern parts (quarters) of Moravia as vassals to his oldest son.

Throughout the Přemyslid era, junior princes often ruled all or part of Moravia from Olomouc, Brno or Znojmo, with varying degrees of autonomy from the ruler of Bohemia. Dukes of Olomouc often acted as the "right hand" of Prague dukes and kings, while Dukes of Brno and especially those of Znojmo were much more insubordinate. Moravia reached its height of autonomy in 1182, when Emperor Frederick I elevated Conrad II Otto of Znojmo to the status of a margrave, (Note: There are no primary testimonies about creating a margraviate (march) as distinct political unit) immediately subject to the emperor, independent of Bohemia. This status was short-lived: in 1186, Conrad Otto was forced to obey the supreme rule of Bohemian duke Frederick. Three years later, Conrad Otto succeeded to Frederick as Duke of Bohemia and subsequently canceled his margrave title. Nevertheless, the margrave title was restored in 1197 when Vladislaus III of Bohemia resolved the succession dispute between him and his brother Ottokar by abdicating from the Bohemian throne and accepting Moravia as a vassal land of Bohemian (i.e., Prague) rulers. Vladislaus gradually established this land as Margraviate, slightly administratively different from Bohemia. After the Battle of Legnica, the Mongols carried their raids into Moravia.

The main line of the Přemyslid dynasty became extinct in 1306, and in 1310 John of Luxembourg became Margrave of Moravia and King of Bohemia. In 1333, he made his son Charles the next Margrave of Moravia (later in 1346, Charles also became the king of Bohemia). In 1349, Charles gave Moravia to his younger brother John Henry who ruled in the margraviate until his death in 1375, after him Moravia was ruled by his oldest son Jobst of Moravia who was in 1410 elected the Holy Roman King but died in 1411 (he is buried with his father in the Church of St. Thomas in Brno – the Moravian capital from which they both ruled). Moravia and Bohemia remained within the Luxembourg dynasty of Holy Roman kings and emperors (except during the Hussite wars), until inherited by Albert II of Habsburg in 1437.

After his death followed the interregnum until 1453; land (as the rest of lands of the Bohemian Crown) was administered by the landfriedens (landfrýdy). The rule of young Ladislaus the Posthumous subsisted only less than five years and subsequently (1458) the Hussite George of Poděbrady was elected as the king. He again reunited all Czech lands (then Bohemia, Moravia, Silesia, Upper & Lower Lusatia) into one-man ruled state. In 1466, Pope Paul II excommunicated George and forbade all Catholics (i.e. about 15% of population) from continuing to serve him. The Hungarian crusade followed and in 1469 Matthias Corvinus conquered Moravia and proclaimed himself (with assistance of rebelling Bohemian nobility) as the king of Bohemia.

The subsequent 21-year period of a divided kingdom was decisive for the rising awareness of a specific Moravian identity, distinct from that of Bohemia. Although Moravia was reunited with Bohemia in 1490 when Vladislaus Jagiellon, king of Bohemia, also became king of Hungary, some attachment to Moravian "freedoms" and resistance to government by Prague continued until the end of independence in 1620. In 1526, Vladislaus' son Louis died in battle and the Habsburg Ferdinand I was elected as his successor.

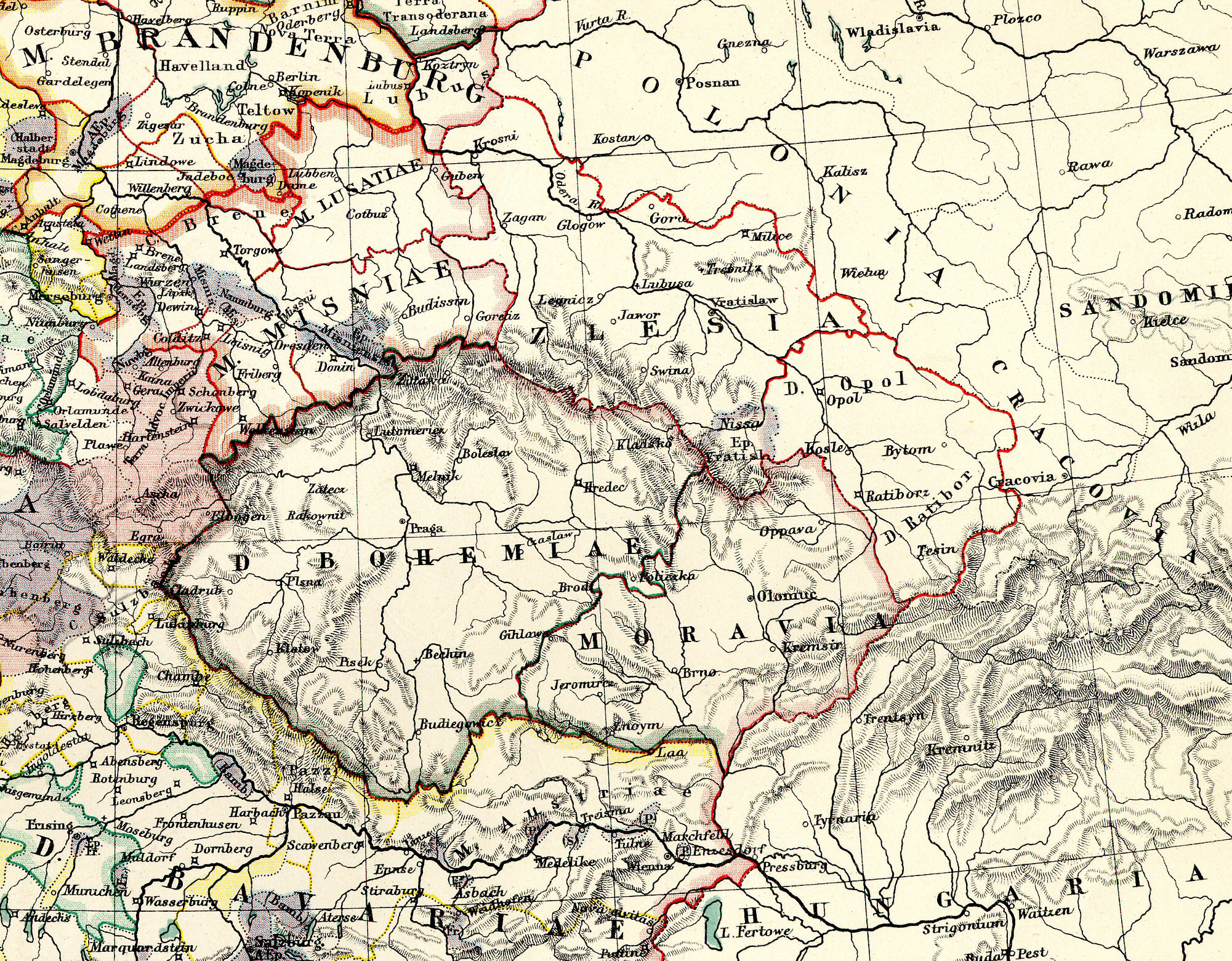
Bohemia and Moravia in the 12th century

Church of St. Thomas in Brno, mausoleum of Moravian branch House of Luxembourg, rulers of Moravia; and the old governor's palace, a former Augustinian abbey

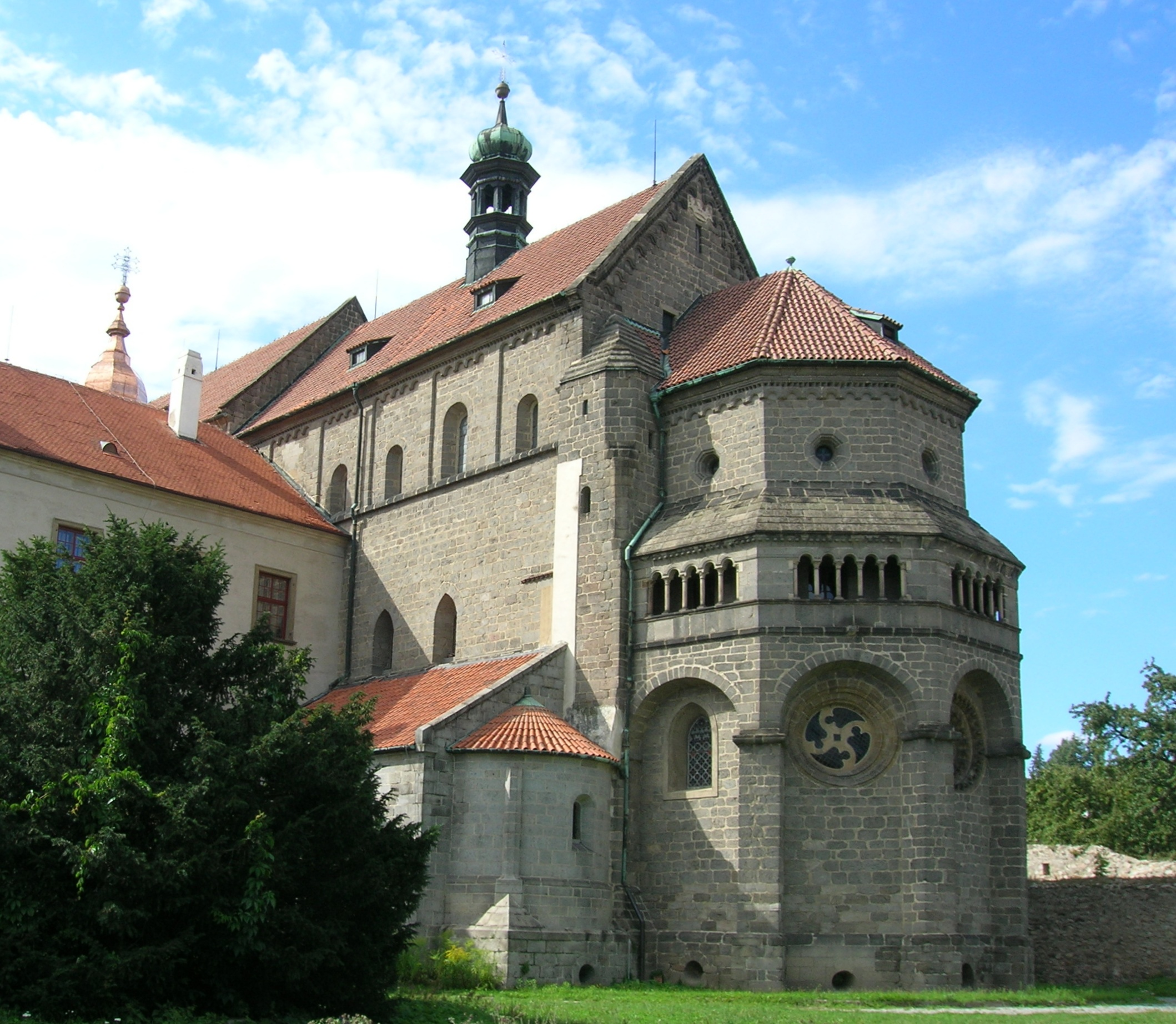
12th century Romanesque St. Procopius Basilica in Třebíč

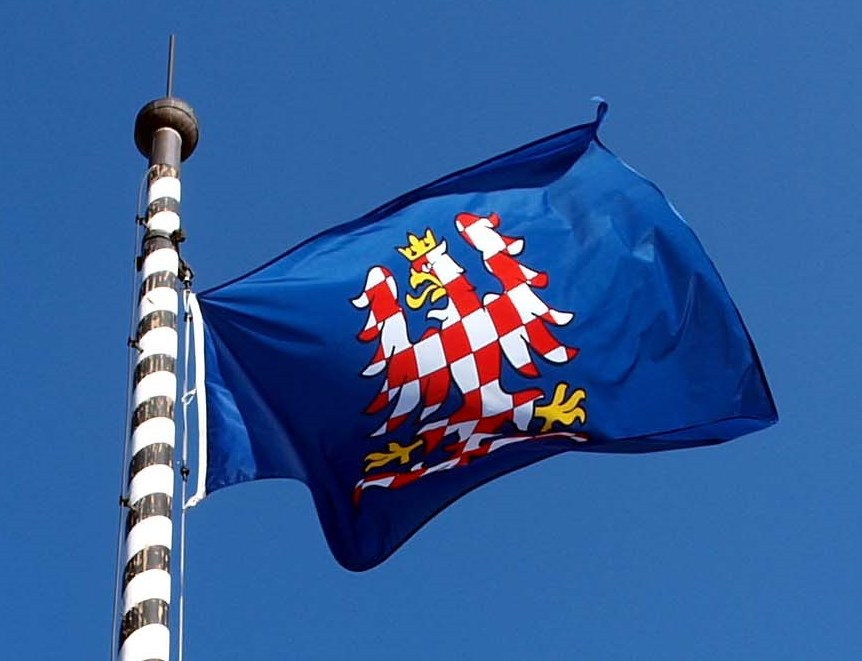
The Moravian banner of arms, which first appeared in the medieval era

=== Habsburg rule (1526–1918) ===
After the death of King Louis II of Hungary and Bohemia in 1526, Ferdinand I of Austria was elected King of Bohemia and thus ruler of the Crown of Bohemia (including Moravia). The epoch 1526–1620 was marked by increasing animosity between Catholic Habsburg kings (emperors) and the Protestant Moravian nobility (and other Crowns') estates. Moravia, like Bohemia, was a Habsburg possession until the end of World War I. In 1573 the Jesuit University of Olomouc was established; this was the first university in Moravia. The establishment of a special papal seminary, Collegium Nordicum, made the university a centre of the Catholic Reformation and effort to revive Catholicism in Central and Northern Europe. The second largest group of students were from Scandinavia.

Brno and Olomouc served as Moravia's capitals until 1641. As the only city to successfully resist the Swedish invasion, Brno become the sole capital following the capture of Olomouc. The Margraviate of Moravia had, from 1348 in Olomouc and Brno, its own Diet, or parliament, zemský sněm (Landtag in German), whose deputies from 1905 onward were elected separately from the ethnically separate German and Czech constituencies. The oldest surviving theatre building in Central Europe, the Reduta Theatre, was established in 17th-century Moravia.

From 1599 to 1711, Moravia was frequently subjected to raids by the Ottoman Empire and its vassals (especially the Tatars and Transylvania). Overall, hundreds of thousands were enslaved whilst tens of thousands were killed.

In 1740, Moravia was invaded by Prussian forces under Frederick the Great, and Olomouc was forced to surrender on 27 December 1741. A few months later, the Prussians were repelled, mainly because of their unsuccessful siege of Brno in 1742. In 1758, Olomouc was besieged by Prussians again, but this time its defenders forced the Prussians to withdraw following the Battle of Domstadtl. In 1777, a new Moravian bishopric was established in Brno, and the Olomouc bishopric was elevated to an archbishopric. In 1782, the Margraviate of Moravia was merged with Austrian Silesia into Moravia-Silesia, with Brno as its capital. Moravia became a separate crown land of Austria again in 1849, and then became part of Cisleithanian Austria-Hungary after 1867. According to Austro-Hungarian census of 1910 the proportion of Czechs in the population of Moravia at the time (2,622,000) was 71.8%, while the proportion of Germans was 27.6%.

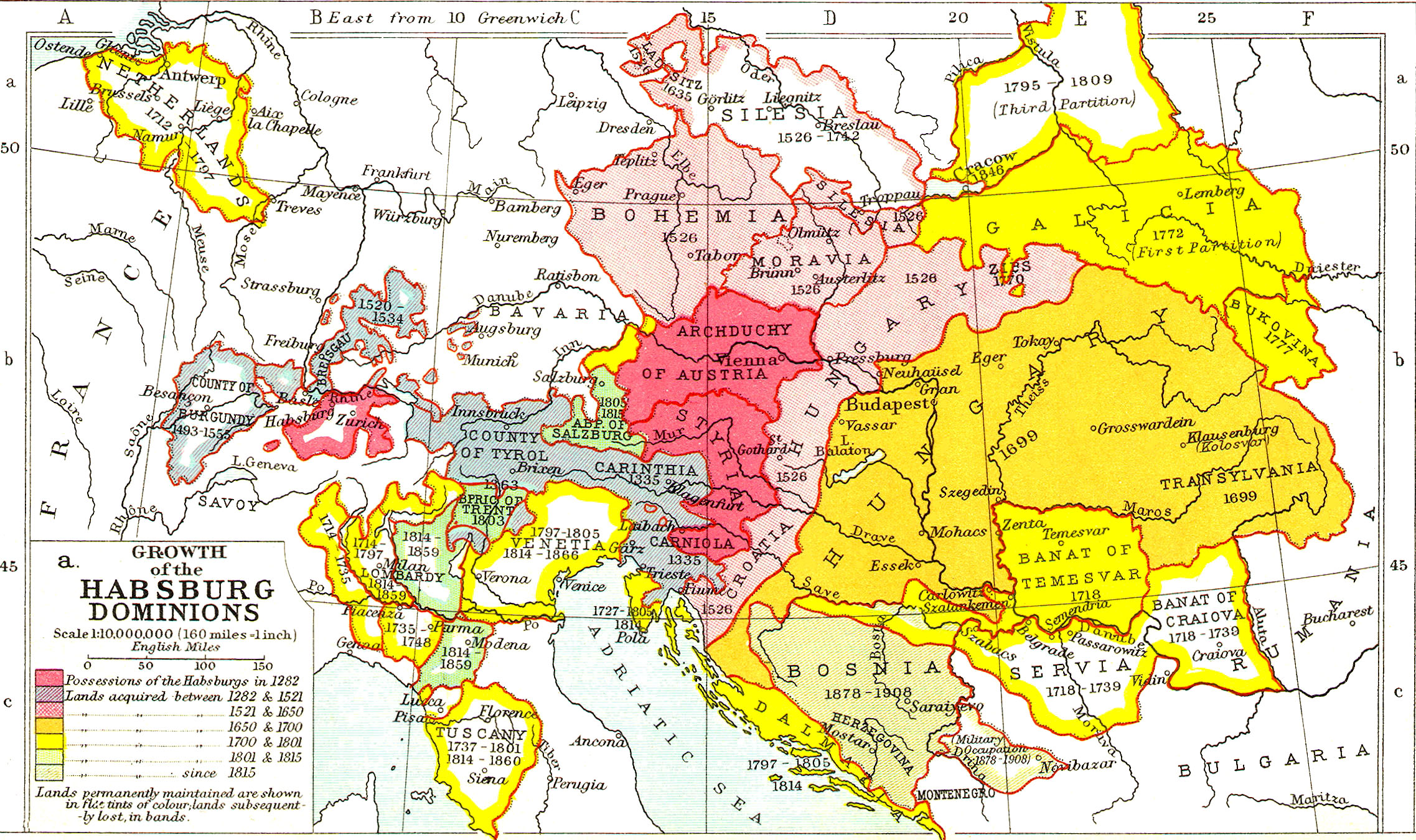
Habsburg Empire Crown lands: growth of the Habsburg territories and Moravia's status

Administrative division of Moravia as crown land of Austria in 1893

=== 20th century ===
Administrative map of Moravia and Silesia, 1906

Following the break-up of Austria-Hungary in 1918, Moravia became part of Czechoslovakia. As one of the five lands of Czechoslovakia, it had restricted autonomy. In 1928 Moravia ceased to exist as a territorial unity and was merged with Czech Silesia into the Moravian-Silesian Land (yet with the natural dominance of Moravia). By the Munich Agreement (1938), the southwestern and northern peripheries of Moravia, which had a German-speaking majority, were annexed by Nazi Germany, and during the German occupation of Czechoslovakia (1938–1945), the remnant of Moravia was an administrative unit within the Protectorate of Bohemia and Moravia.

During World War II, the Germans operated multiple forced labour camps in the region, including several subcamps of the Stalag VIII-B/344 prisoner-of-war camp for Allied POWs, a subcamp of the Auschwitz concentration camp in Brno for mostly Polish prisoners, and a subcamp of the Gross-Rosen concentration camp in Bílá Voda for Jewish women. The occupiers also established several POW camps, including Heilag VIII-H, Oflag VIII-F and Oflag VIII-H, for French, British, Belgian and other Allied POWs in the region.

In 1945 after the Allied defeat of Germany and the end of World War II, the German minority was expelled to Germany and Austria in accordance with the Potsdam Agreement. The Moravian-Silesian Land was restored with Moravia as part of it and towns and villages that were left by the former German inhabitants, were re-settled by Czechs, Slovaks and reemigrants. In 1949 the territorial division of Czechoslovakia was radically changed, as the Moravian-Silesian Land was abolished and Lands were replaced by "kraje" (regions), whose borders substantially differ from the historical Bohemian-Moravian border, so Moravia politically ceased to exist after more than 1100 years (833–1949) of its history. Although another administrative reform in 1960 implemented (among others) the North Moravian and the South Moravian regions (Severomoravský and Jihomoravský kraj), with capitals in Ostrava and Brno respectively, their joint area was only roughly alike the historical state and, chiefly, there was no land or federal autonomy, unlike Slovakia.

After the fall of the Soviet Union and the whole Eastern Bloc, the Czechoslovak Federal Assembly condemned the cancellation of Moravian-Silesian land and expressed "firm conviction that this injustice will be corrected" in 1990. However, after the breakup of Czechoslovakia into Czech Republic and Slovakia in 1993, Moravian area remained integral to the Czech territory, and the latest administrative division of Czech Republic (introduced in 2000) is similar to the administrative division of 1949. Nevertheless, the federalist or separatist movement in Moravia is completely marginal.

The centuries-lasting historical Bohemian-Moravian border has been preserved up to now only by the Czech Roman Catholic Administration, as the Ecclesiastical Province of Moravia corresponds with the former Moravian-Silesian Land. The popular perception of the Bohemian-Moravian border's location is distorted by the memory of the 1960 regions (whose boundaries are still partly in use).

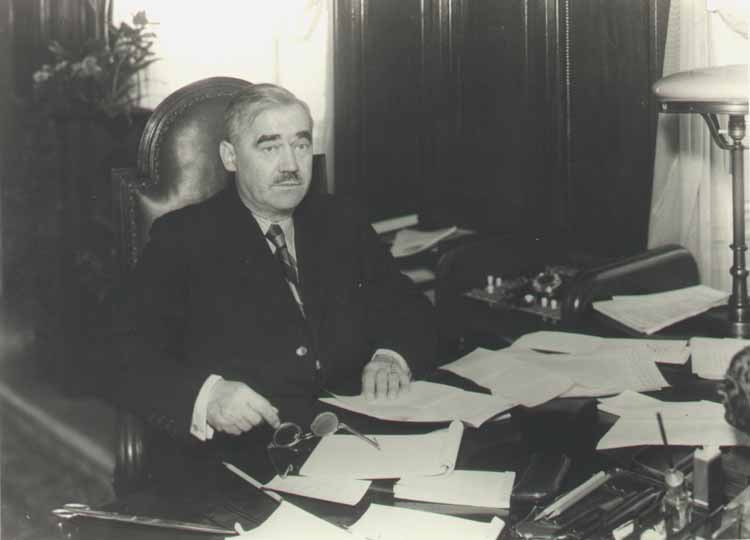
Jan Černý, president of Moravia in 1922–1926, later also Prime Minister of Czechoslovakia

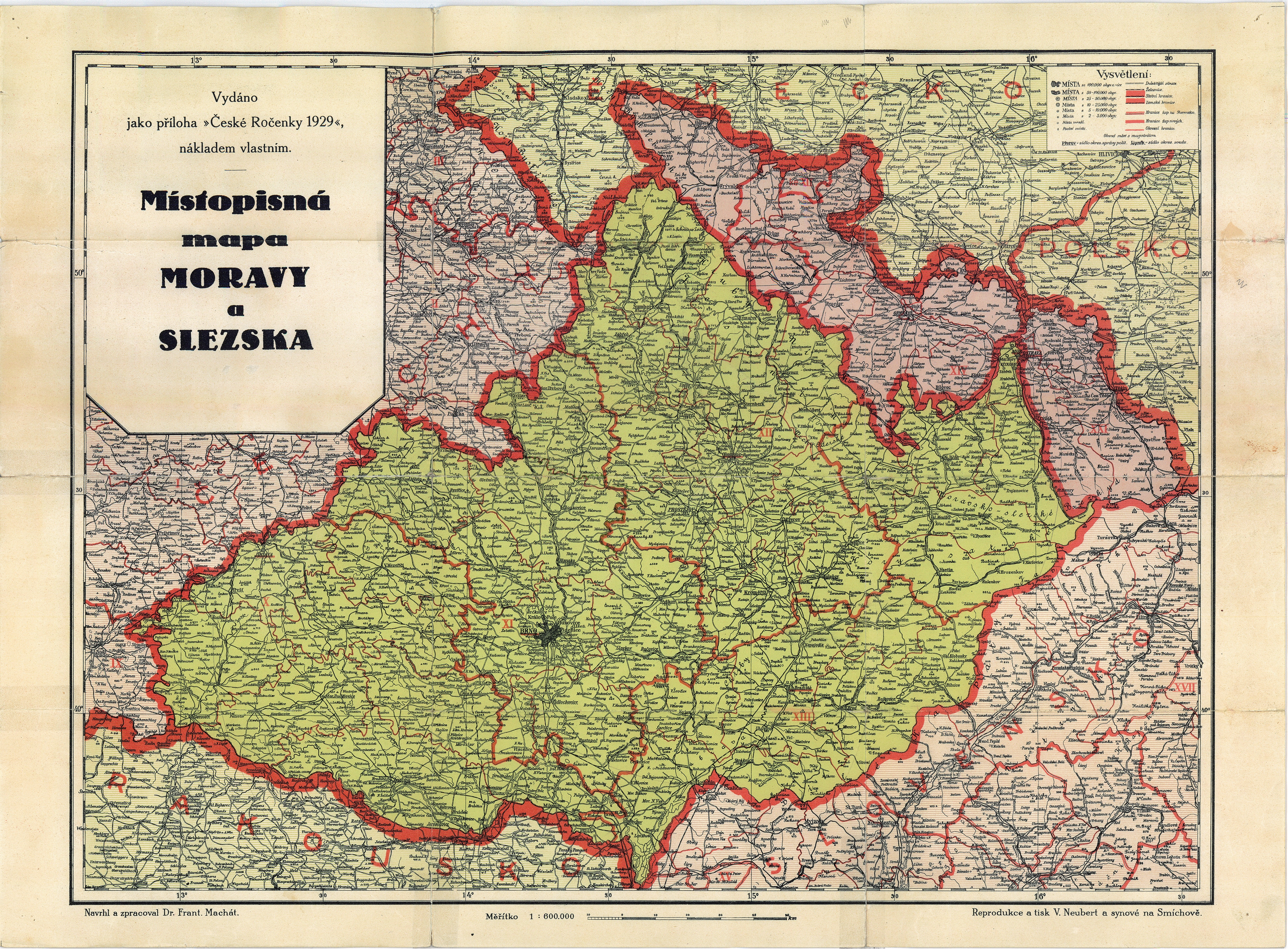
A general map of Moravia in the 1920s

In 1928, Moravia was merged into Moravia-Silesia, one of four lands of Czechoslovakia, together with Bohemia, Slovakia and Subcarpathian Rus.

== Economy ==
An area in South Moravia, around Hodonín and Břeclav, is part of the Viennese Basin. Petroleum and lignite are found there in abundance. The main economic centres of Moravia are Brno, Olomouc, Zlín, and Ostrava lying directly on the Moravian–Silesian border. As well as agriculture in general, Moravia is noted for its viticulture; it contains 94% of the Czech Republic's vineyards and is at the centre of the country's wine industry. Wallachia has at least a 400-year-old tradition of slivovitz making.

The Czech automotive industry also played a significant role in Moravia's economy in the 20th century; the factories of Wikov in Prostějov and Tatra in Kopřivnice produced many automobiles.

Moravia is also the centre of the Czech firearm industry, as the vast majority of Czech firearms manufacturers (e.g. CZUB, Zbrojovka Brno, Czech Small Arms, Czech Weapons, ZVI, Great Gun) are found in Moravia. Almost all the well-known Czech sporting, self-defence, military, and hunting firearms are made in Moravia. Meopta rifle scopes are of Moravian origin. The original Bren gun was conceived here, as were the assault rifles the CZ-805 BREN and Sa vz. 58, and the handguns CZ 75 and ZVI Kevin (also known as the "Micro Desert Eagle").

The Zlín Region hosts several aircraft manufacturers, namely Let Kunovice (also known as Aircraft Industries, a.s.), ZLIN AIRCRAFT a.s. Otrokovice (formerly known under the name Moravan Otrokovice), Evektor-Aerotechnik, and Czech Sport Aircraft. Sport aircraft are also manufactured in Jihlava by Jihlavan Airplanes/Skyleader.

Aircraft production in the region started in the 1930s; after a period of low production post-1989, there have been signs of recovery post-2010, and production is expected to grow from 2013 onwards.

Companies with operations in Brno include Gen Digital, which maintains one of its headquarters there and continues to use the brand AVG Technologies, as well as Kyndryl (Client Innovation Centre), AT&T, and Honeywell (Global Design Center). Other significant companies include Siemens, Red Hat (Czech headquarters), and an office of Zebra Technologies.

In recent years, Brno's economy has seen growth in the quaternary sector, focusing on science, research, and education. Notable projects include AdMaS (Advanced Materials, Structures, and Technologies) and CETOCOEN (Center for Research on Toxic Substances in the Environment).

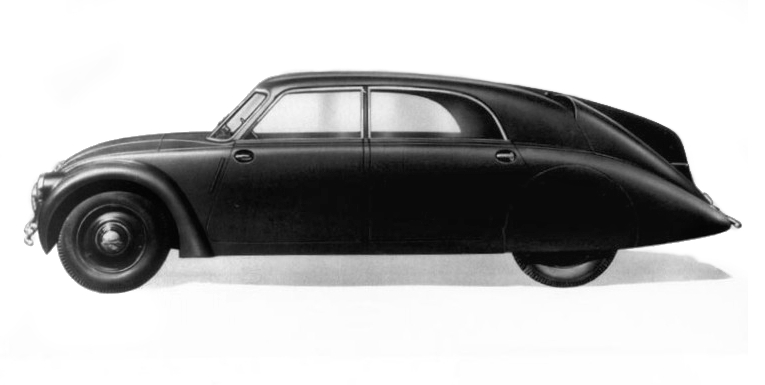
The Tatra 77 (1934)

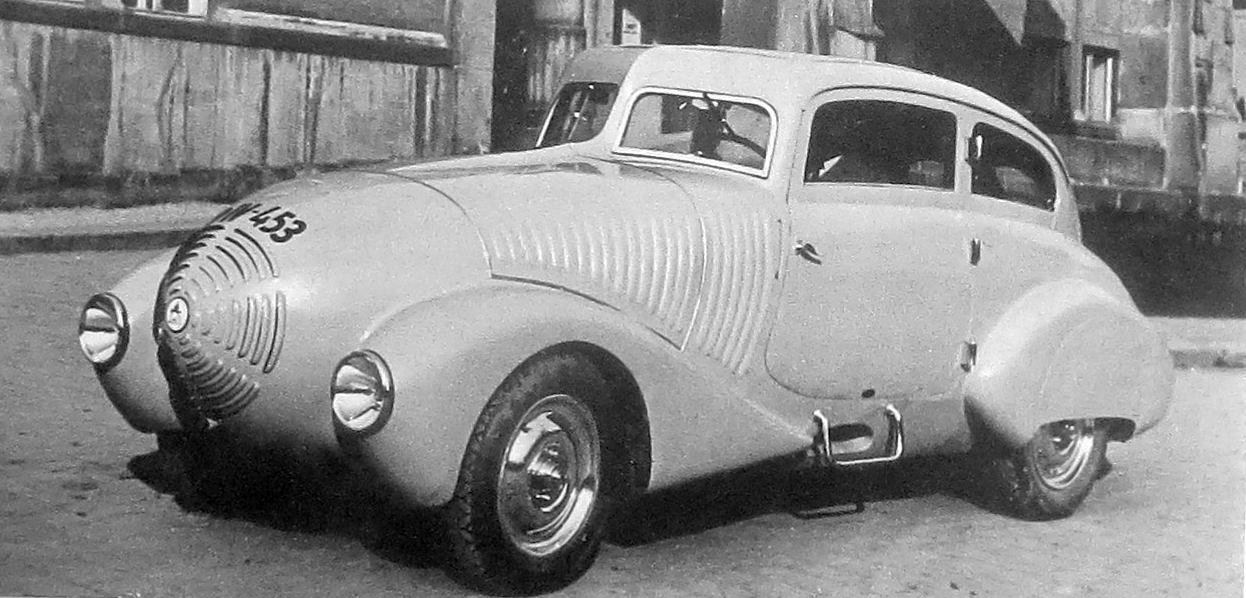
WIKOV Supersport (1931)

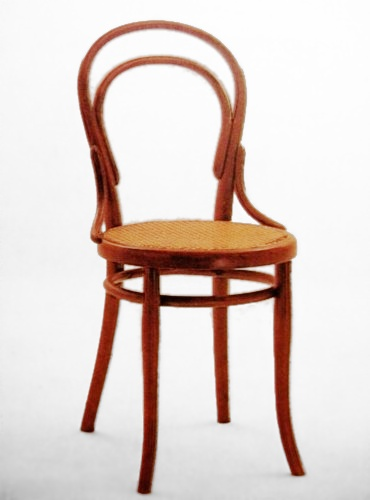
Thonet No. 14 chair

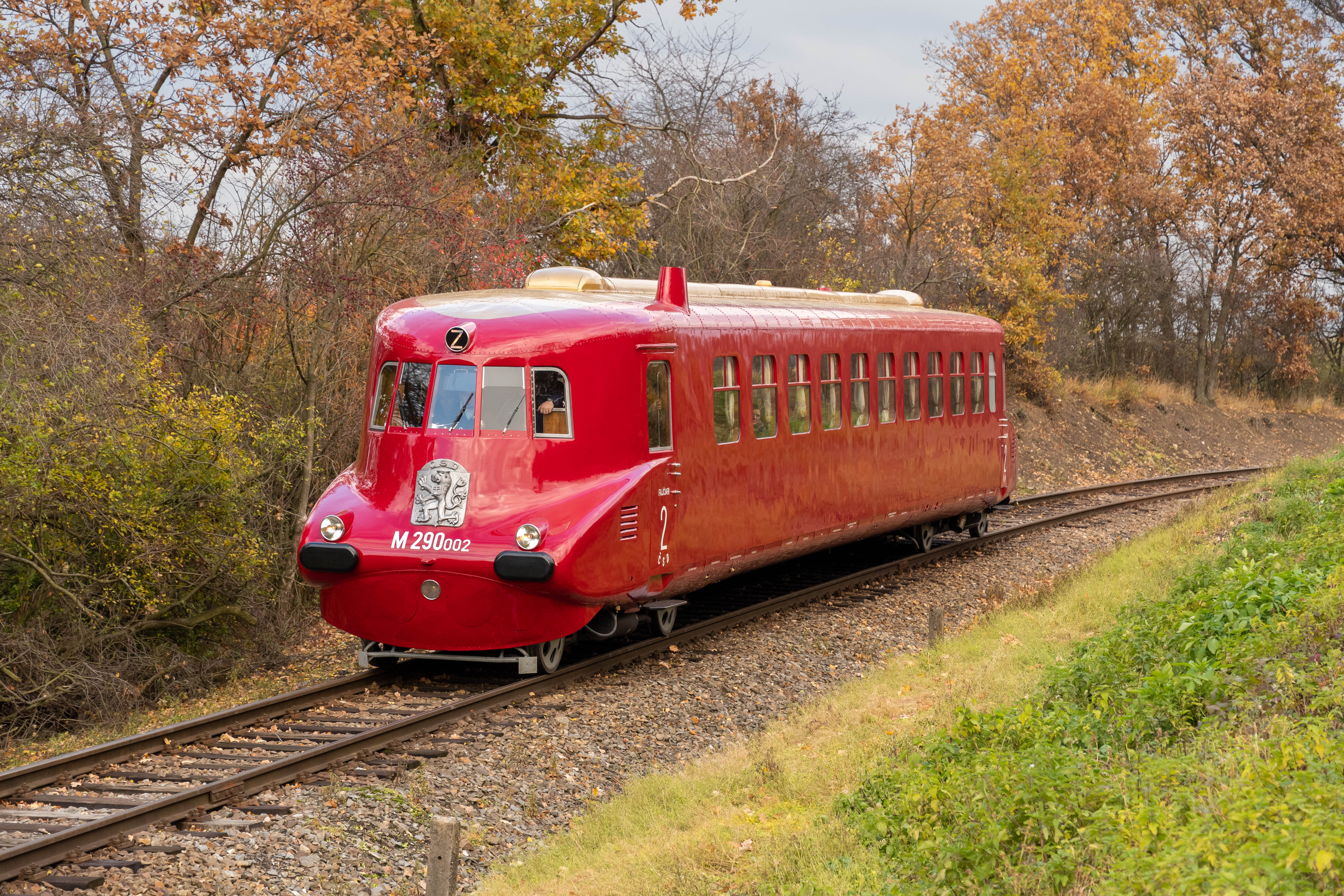
The speed train Tatra M 290.0 Slovenská strela 1936

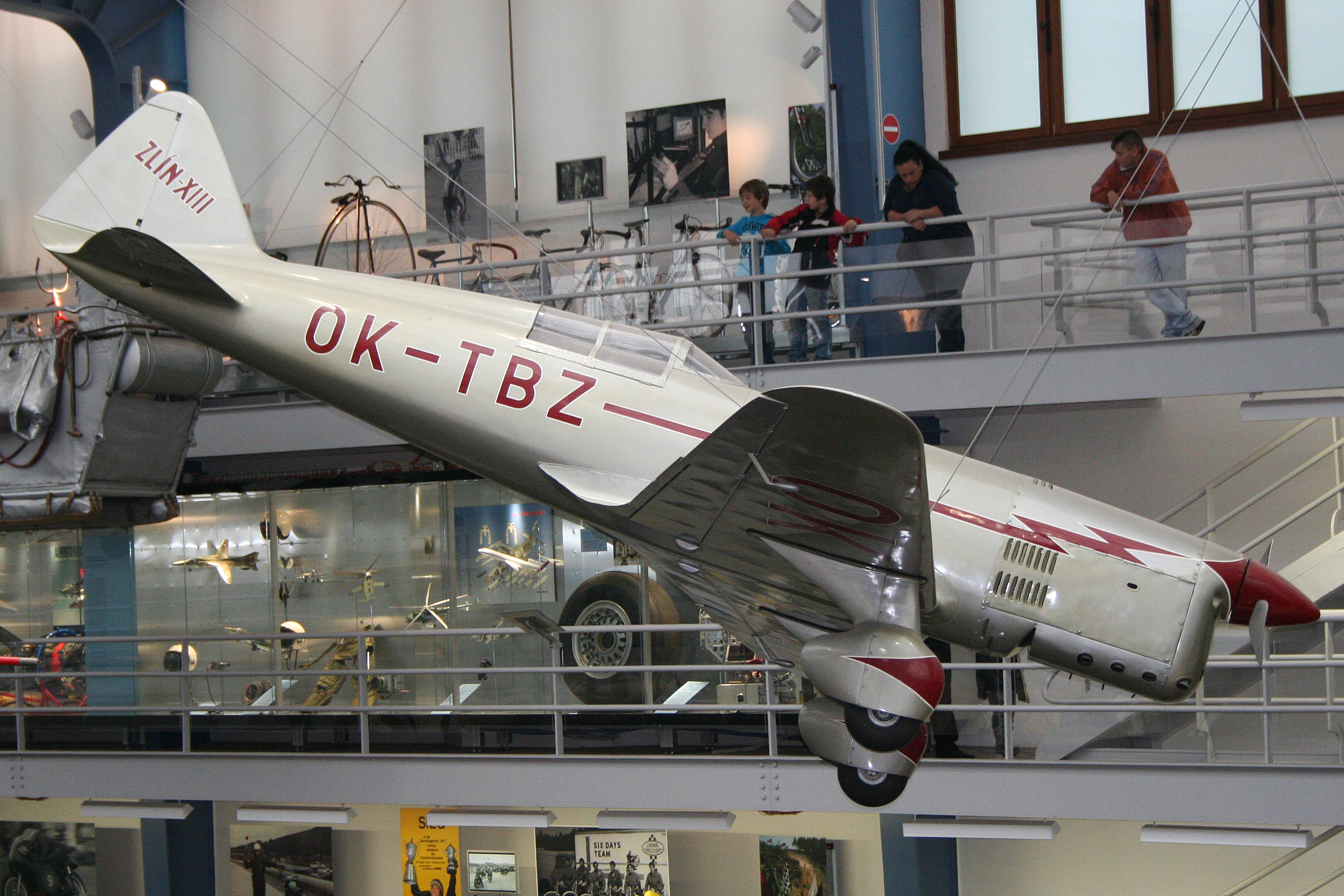
Zlín XIII aircraft on display at the National Technical Museum in Prague

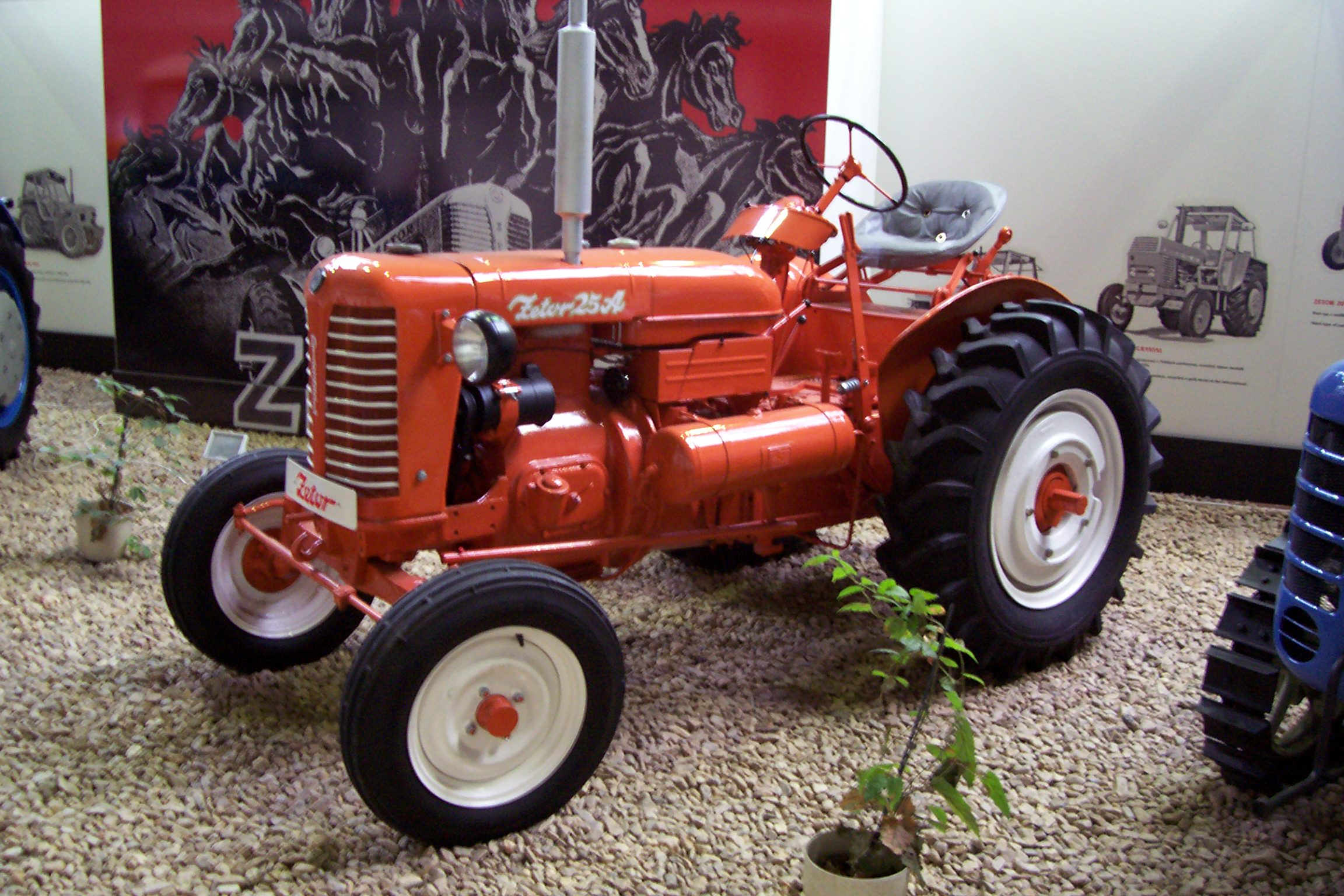
Zetor 25A tractor

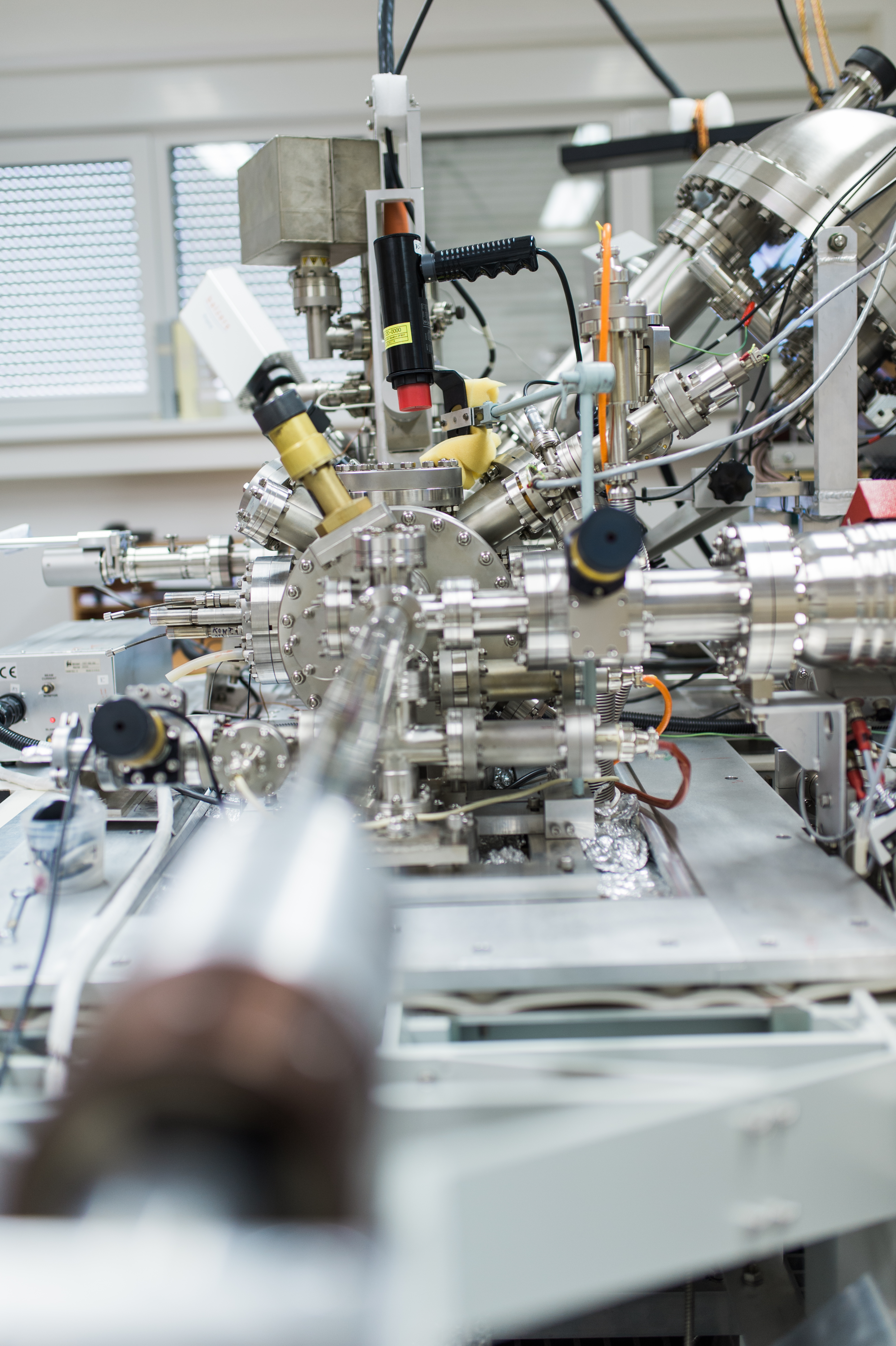
Electron microscope Brno

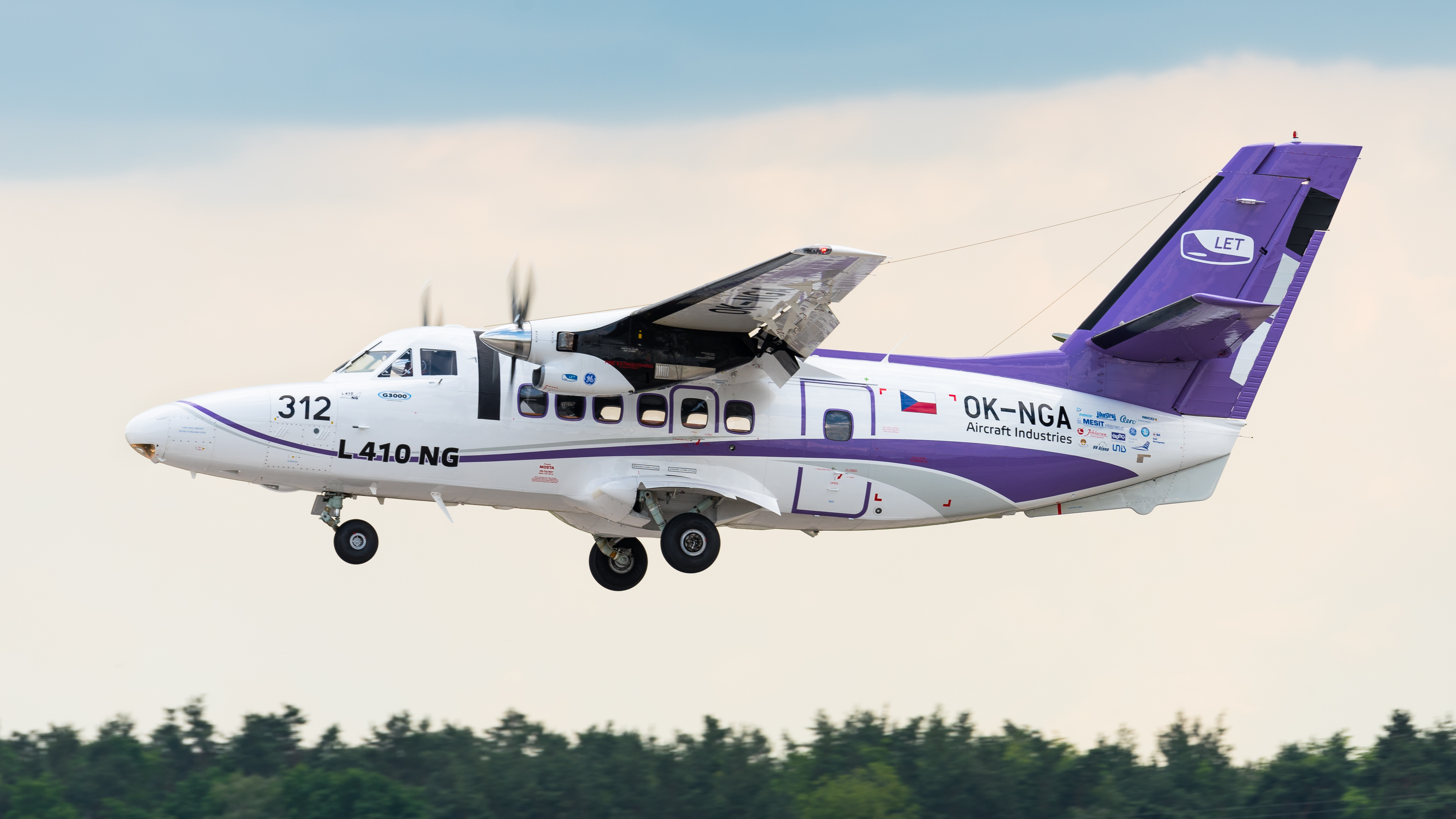
Aeroplane L 410 NG by Let Kunovice

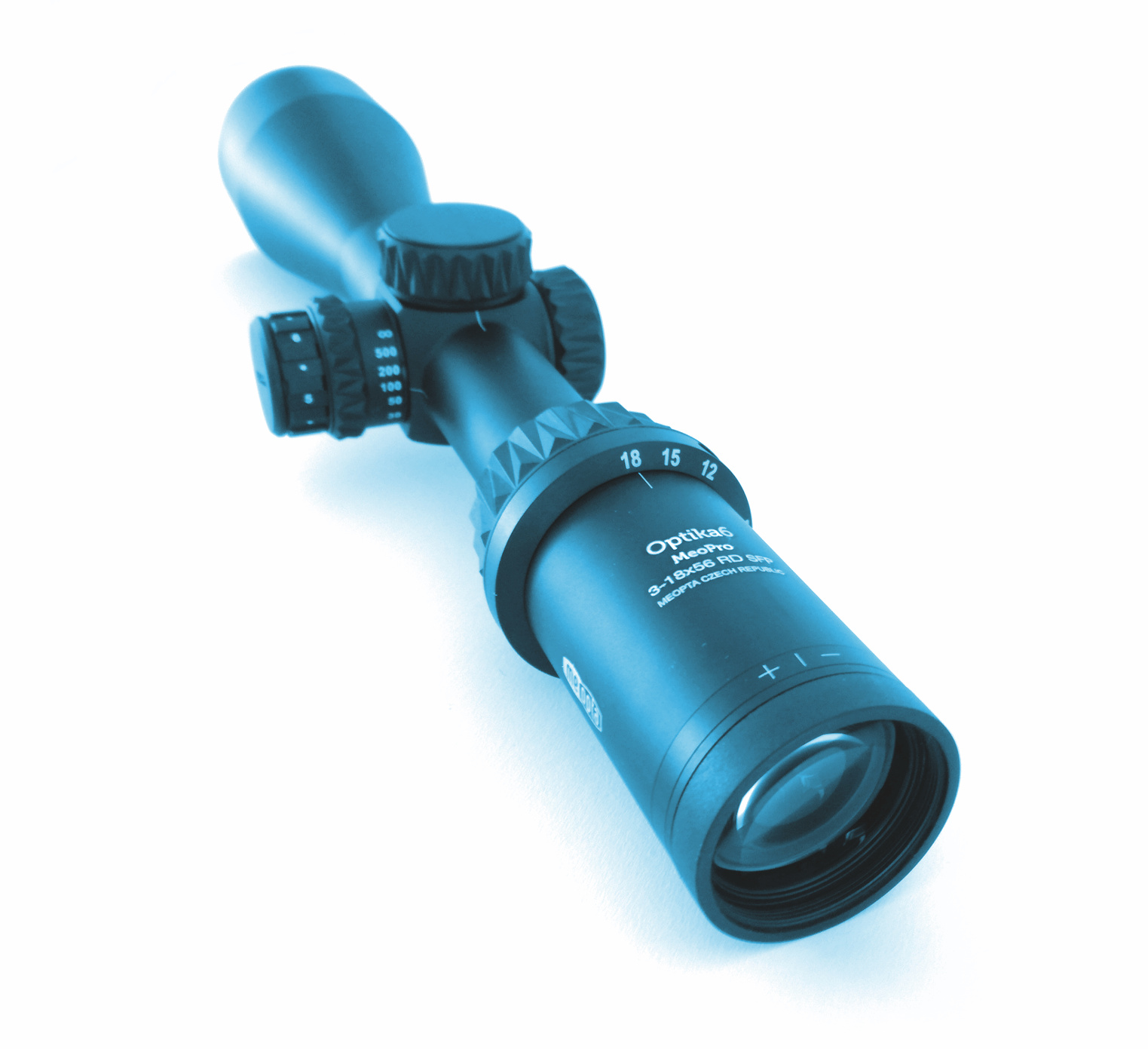
Precise rifle scope by MeOpta

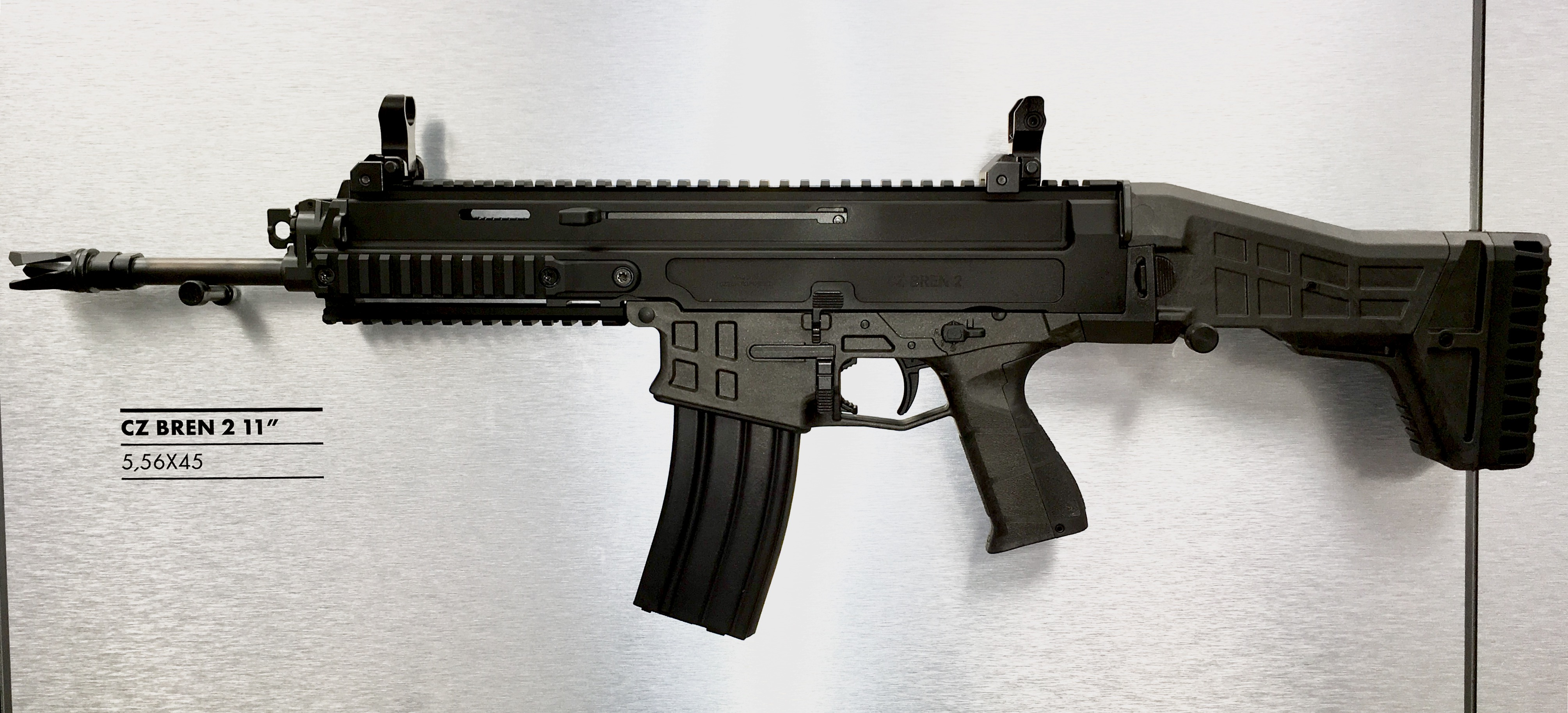
The (modern) BREN gun M 2 11

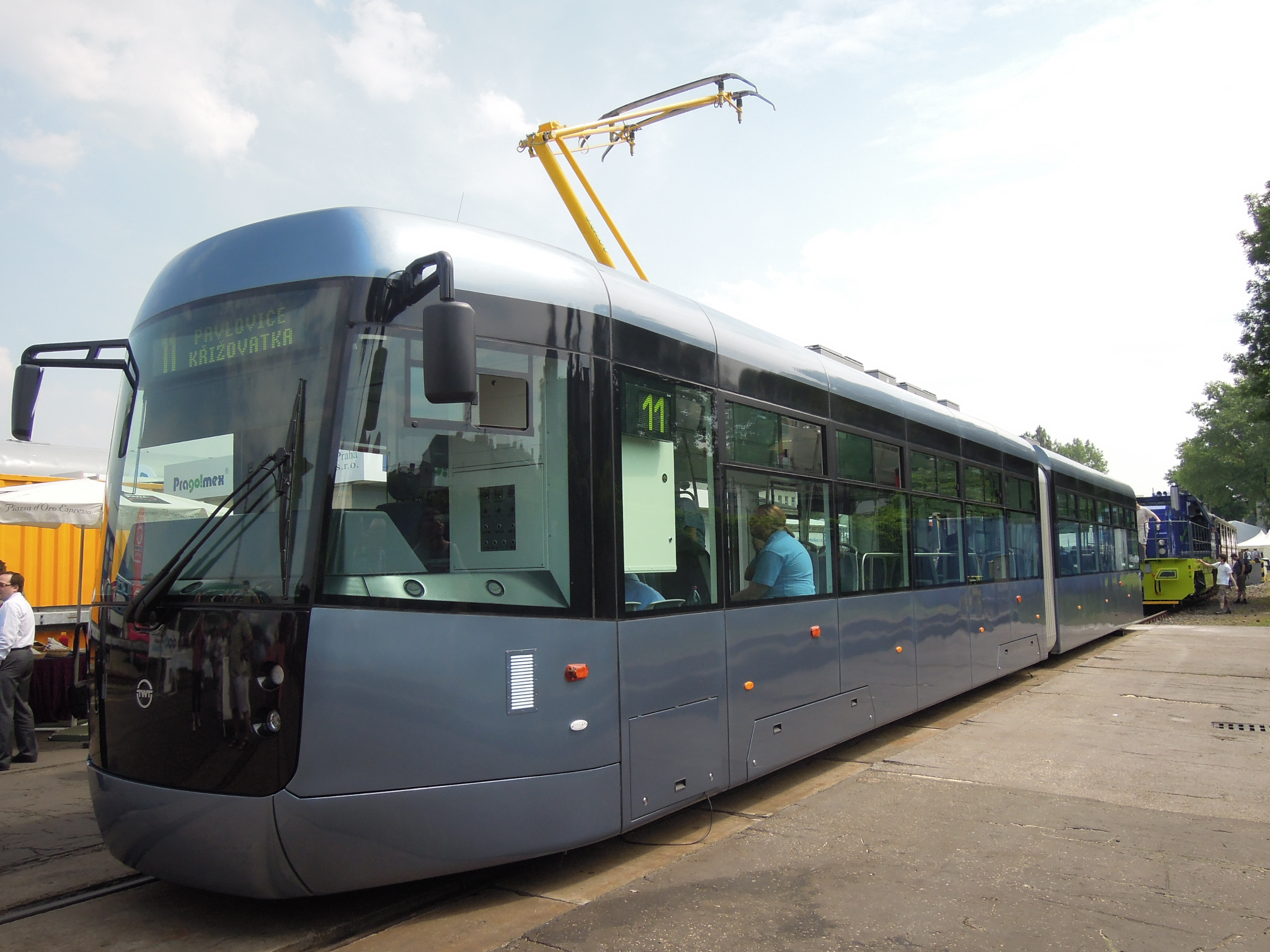
The modern EVO 2 tram

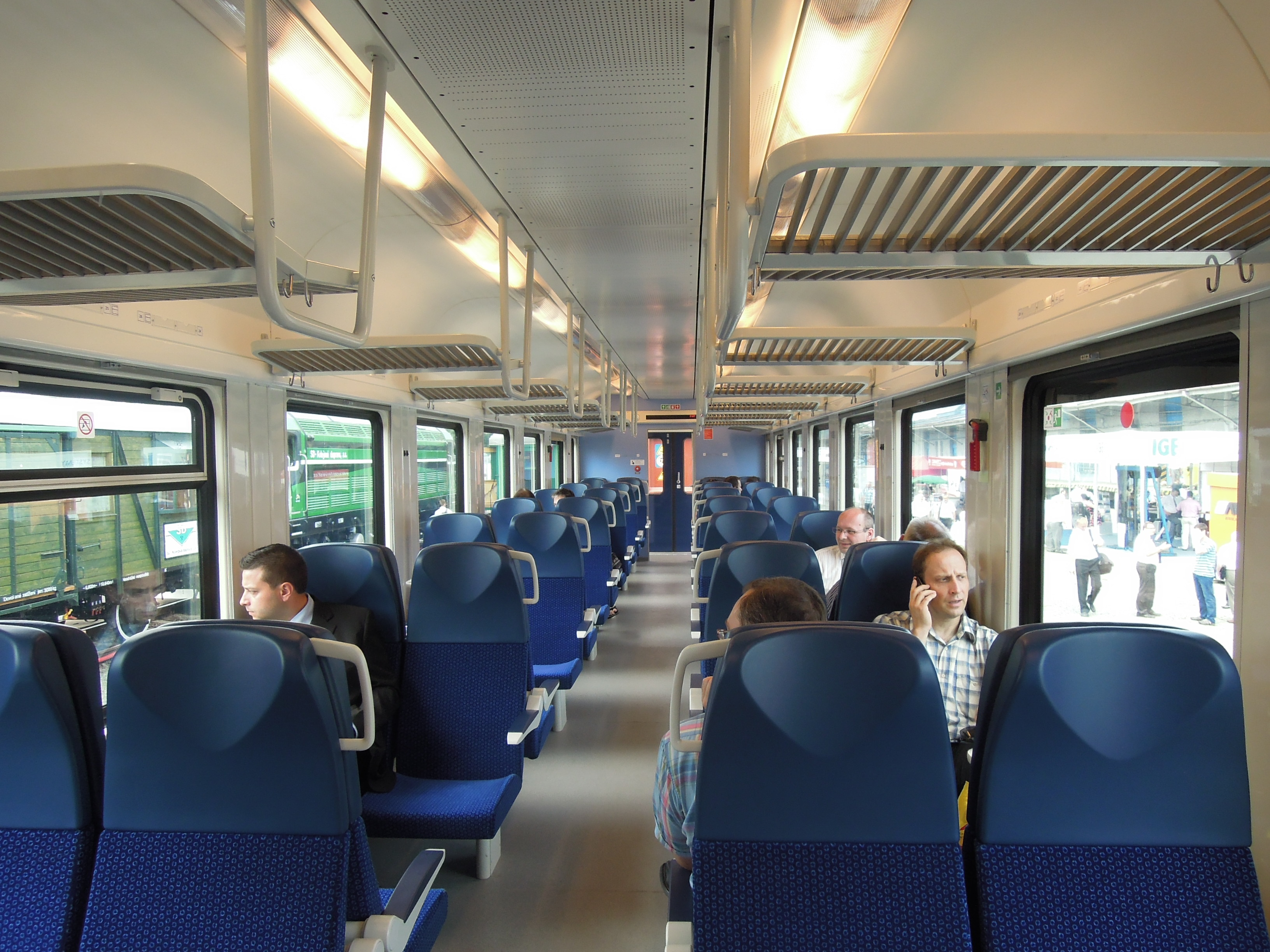
Diesel railway coach class Bfhpvee295

=== Machinery industry ===
The machinery industry has been the most important industrial sector in the region, especially in South Moravia, for many decades. The main centres of machinery production are Brno (Zbrojovka Brno, Zetor, První brněnská strojírna, Siemens), Blansko (ČKD Blansko, Metra), Kuřim (TOS Kuřim), Boskovice (Minerva, Novibra) and Břeclav (Otis Elevator Company). A number of other, smaller machinery and machine parts factories, companies, and workshops are spread over Moravia.

=== Electrical industry ===
The beginnings of the electrical industry in Moravia date back to 1918. The biggest centres of electrical production are Brno (VUES, ZPA Brno, EM Brno), Drásov, Frenštát pod Radhoštěm, and Mohelnice (currently Siemens).

== Cities and towns ==
Population figures below are from the Czech Statistical Office.

=== Cities ===
- Brno (401,000 inhabitants) former land capital and nowadays capital of South Moravian Region; industrial, judicial, educational and research centre; railway and motorway junction
- Ostrava (285,000; central part, Moravská Ostrava, lies historically in Moravia, most of the outskirts are in Czech Silesia), capital of Moravian-Silesian Region, centre of heavy industry
- Olomouc (102,000), capital of Olomouc Region, medieval land capital, seat of Roman Catholic archbishop, cultural centre of Hanakia and Central Moravia
- Zlín (74,000), capital of Zlín Region, modern city developed after World War I by the Bata Shoes company
- Jihlava (54,000; mostly in Moravia, northwestern periphery lies in Bohemia), capital of Vysočina Region, centre of the Bohemian-Moravian Highlands
- Frýdek-Místek (54,000), twin-city lying directly on the old Moravian-Silesian border (the western part, Místek, is Moravian), in the industrial area around Ostrava
- Prostějov (44,000), former centre of clothing and fashion industry, birthplace of Edmund Husserl
- Přerov (42,000), important railway hub and archaeological site (Předmostí u Přerova)

=== Towns ===
- Třebíč (35,000), located in the Highlands, with exceptionally preserved Jewish quarter
- Znojmo (34,000), historical and cultural centre of southwestern Moravia
- Kroměříž (28,000), historical town in southern Hanakia
- Vsetín (25,000), centre of the Moravian Wallachia
- Šumperk (25,000), centre of the north of Moravia, at the foot of Hrubý Jeseník
- Uherské Hradiště (25,000), cultural centre of the Moravian Slovakia
- Břeclav (25,000), important railway hub in the very south of Moravia
- Hodonín (24,000), another town in the Moravian Slovakia, the birthplace of Tomáš Garrigue Masaryk
- Nový Jičín (23,000), historical town with hatting industry
- Valašské Meziříčí (23,000), centre of chemical industry in Moravian Wallachia
- Kopřivnice (22,000), centre of automotive industry (Tatra), south from Ostrava
- Žďár nad Sázavou (21,000), industrial town in the Highlands, near the border with Bohemia
- Vyškov (20,000), local centre at a motorway junction halfway between Brno and Olomouc
- Blansko (20,000), industrial town north from Brno, at the foot of the Moravian Karst

== People ==
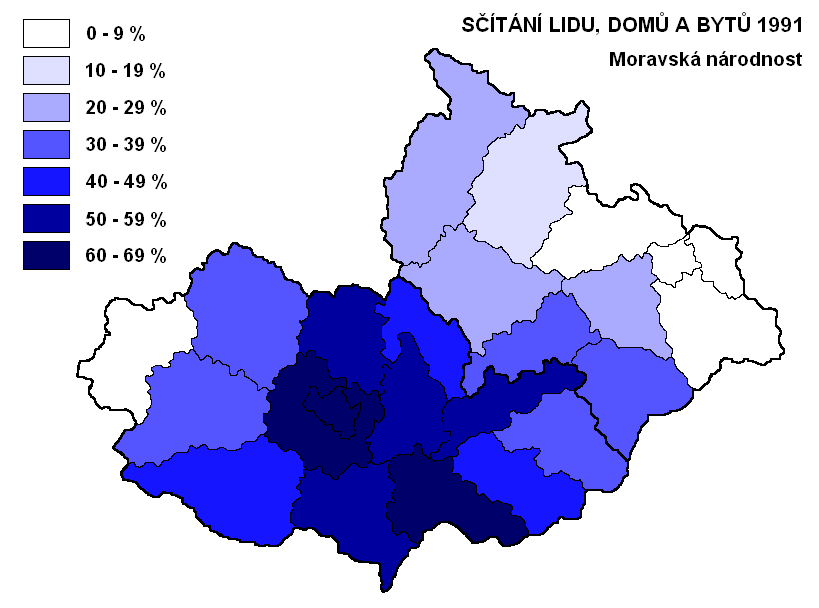
Moravian nationality, as declared by people in the 1991 census

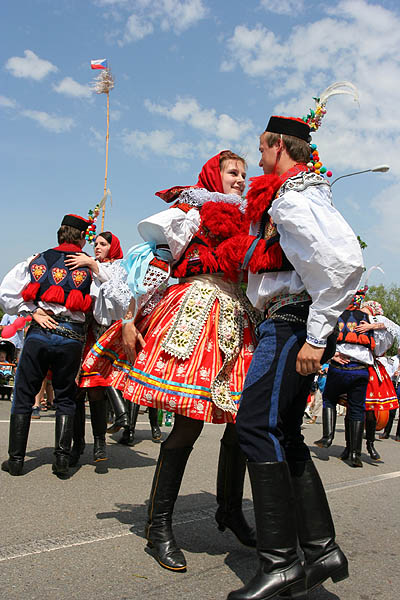
Moravian Slovak kroje during the Ride of the Kings festival held annually in Vlčnov, southeastern Moravia

The Moravians are generally a Slavic ethnic group who speak various (generally more archaic) dialects of Czech. Before the expulsion of Germans from Moravia the Moravian German minority also referred to themselves as "Moravians" (Mährer). Those expelled and their descendants continue to identify as Moravian. Some Moravians assert that Moravian is a language distinct from Czech; however, their position is not widely supported by academics and the public. Some Moravians identify as an ethnically distinct group; the majority consider themselves to be ethnically Czech. In the census of 1991 (the first census in history in which respondents were allowed to claim Moravian nationality), 1,362,000 (13.2%) of the Czech population identified as being of Moravian nationality (or ethnicity). In some parts of Moravia (mostly in the centre and south), majority of the population identified as Moravians, rather than Czechs. In the census of 2001, the number of Moravians had decreased to 380,000 (3.7% of the country's population). In the census of 2011, this number rose to 522,474 (4.9% of the Czech population).

Moravia historically had a large minority of ethnic Germans, some of whom had arrived as early as the 13th century at the behest of the Přemyslid dynasty. Germans continued to come to Moravia in waves, culminating in the 18th century. They lived in the main city centres and in the countryside along the border with Austria (stretching up to Brno) and along the border with Silesia at Jeseníky, and also in two language islands, around Jihlava and around Moravská Třebová. After World War II, the Czechoslovak government almost fully expelled them in retaliation for their support of Nazi Germany's invasion and dismemberment of Czechoslovakia (1938–1939) and subsequent German war crimes (1938–1945) towards the Czech, Moravian, and Jewish populations.

=== Moravians ===
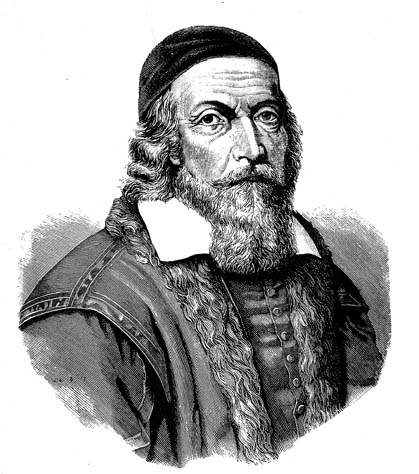
John Amos Comenius

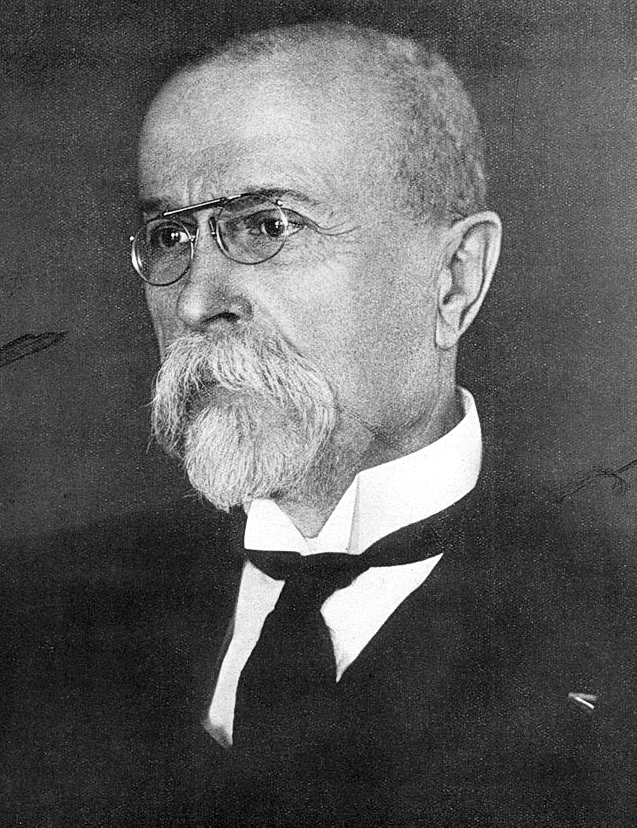
Tomáš Garrigue Masaryk

Notable people from Moravia include:

- Anton Pilgram (1450–1516), architect, sculptor and woodcarver
- Jakub Kunvaldský (1528–1578), Lutheran minister and editor of hymnals
- Jan Ámos Komenský (Comenius) (1592–1670), educator and theologian, last bishop of Unity of the Brethren
- Georg Joseph Camellus (1661–1706), Jesuit missionary to the Philippines, pharmacist and botanist
- David Zeisberger (1717–1807) Moravian missionary to the Leni Lenape, "Apostle to the Indians"
- Georgius Prochaska (1749–1820), ophthalmologist and physiologist
- František Palacký (1798–1876), historian and politician, "The Father of the Czech nation"
- Gregor Mendel (1822–1884), founder of genetics
- Ernst Mach (1838–1916), physicist and philosopher
- Tomáš Garrigue Masaryk (1850–1937), philosopher and politician, first president of Czechoslovakia
- Leoš Janáček (1854–1928), composer
- Sigmund Freud (1856–1939), Austrian neurologist
- Edmund Husserl (1859–1938), philosopher
- Alfons Mucha (1860–1939), painter
- Zdeňka Wiedermannová-Motyčková (1868–1915), women's rights activist
- Adolf Loos (1870–1933), architect
- Karl Renner (1870–1950), Austrian statesman, co-founder of Friends of Nature movement
- Tomáš Baťa (1876–1932), entrepreneur, founder of Bata Shoes company
- Joseph Schumpeter (1883–1950), economist and political scientist
- Marie Jeritza (1887–1982), opera singer
- Hans Krebs (1888–1947), Nazi SS officer executed for treason
- Ludvík Svoboda (1895–1979), army general, president of Czechoslovakia
- Klement Gottwald (1896–1953), politician, president of Czechoslovakia
- Erich Wolfgang Korngold (1897–1957), composer
- George Placzek (1905–1955), physicist, participant in Manhattan Project
- Kurt Gödel (1906–1978), theoretical mathematician
- Oskar Schindler (1908–1974), German industrialist credited with saving almost 1,200 Jews during the Holocaust
- Jan Kubiš (1913–1942), paratrooper who assassinated Nazi despot R. Heydrich
- Bohumil Hrabal (1914–1997), writer
- Thomas J. Bata (1914–2008), entrepreneur, son of Tomáš Baťa and former head of the Bata shoe company
- Emil Zátopek (1922–2000), long-distance runner, Olympic winner
- Karel Reisz (1926–2002), filmmaker
- Milan Kundera (1929–2023), writer
- Václav Nedomanský (born 1944), ice hockey player
- Karel Kryl (1944–1994), poet and protest singer-songwriter
- Karel Loprais (1949–2021), truck race driver, multiple winner of the Dakar Rally
- Ivana Trump (1949–2022), socialite and business magnate, former wife of Donald Trump
- Ivan Lendl (born 1959), tennis player
- Petr Nečas (born 1964), politician, Czech Prime Minister in 2010–2013
- Paulina Porizkova (born 1965), model, actress and writer
- Jana Novotná (1968–2017), tennis player
- Jiří Šlégr (born 1971), ice hockey player
- Bohuslav Sobotka (born 1971), politician, Czech Prime Minister in 2014–2017
- Magdalena Kožená (born 1973), mezzo-soprano
- Markéta Irglová (born 1988), singer-songwriter
- Petra Kvitová (born 1990), tennis player
- Adam Ondra (born 1993), rock climber
- Barbora Krejčíková (born 1996), tennis player

=== Ethnographic regions ===
Moravia can be divided on dialectal and lore basis into several ethnographic regions of comparable significance. In this sense, it is more heterogenous than Bohemia. Significant parts of Moravia, usually those formerly inhabited by the German speakers, are dialectally indifferent, as they have been resettled by people from various Czech (and Slovak) regions.

The principal cultural regions of Moravia are:

- Hanakia (Haná) in the central and northern part
- Lachia (Lašsko) in the northeastern tip
- Highlands (Horácko) in the west
- Moravian Slovakia (Slovácko) in the southeast
- Moravian Wallachia (Valašsko) in the east

== Places of interest ==
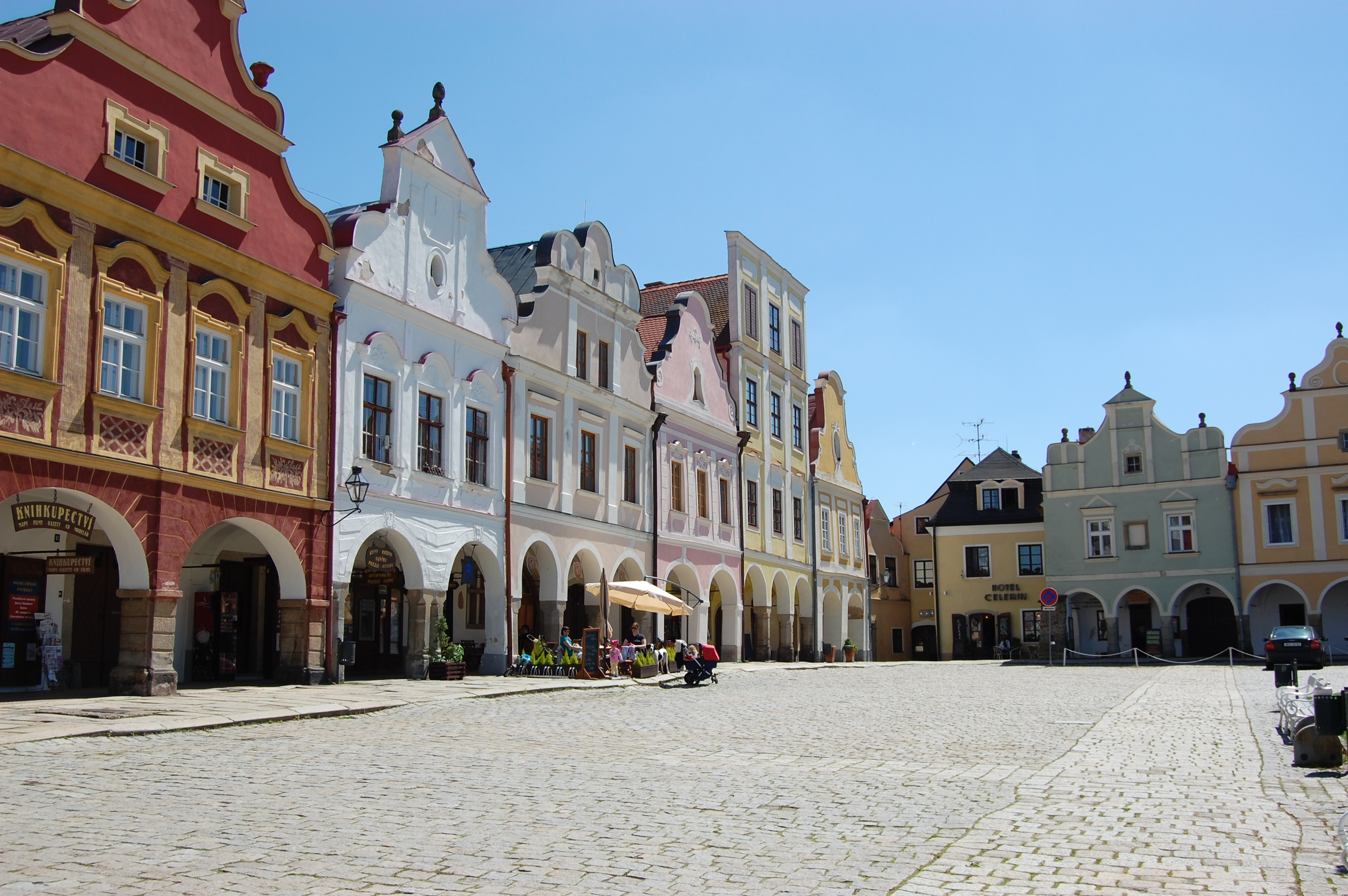
Historic Centre of Telč

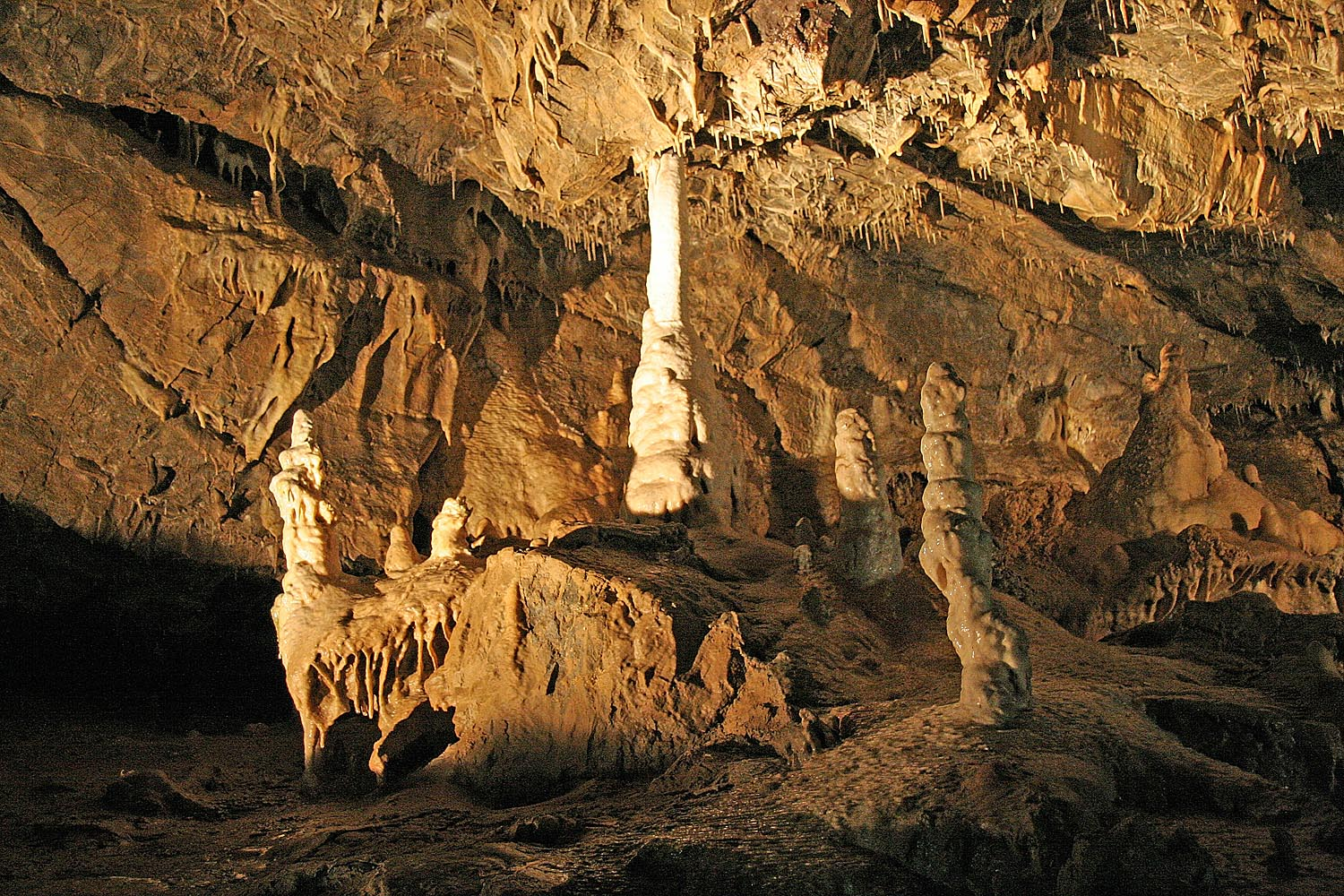
Punkevní Cave in the Moravian Karst

=== World Heritage Sites ===
- Gardens and Castle at Kroměříž
- Historic Centre of Telč
- Holy Trinity Column in Olomouc
- Jewish Quarter and St Procopius' Basilica in Třebíč
- Lednice-Valtice Cultural Landscape
- Pilgrimage Church of St John of Nepomuk at Zelená Hora
- Tugendhat Villa in Brno

=== Castles and manor houses ===
Moravia is noted for its concentration of castles and manor houses, several of which are linked by the Moravian Heritage Route.

- Pernštejn Castle, a Gothic-Renaissance castle near Nedvědice, founded c. 1270–1285 by the Lords of Medlov
- Bouzov Castle, a neo-Gothic castle in the Olomouc Region first mentioned in 1317 and rebuilt in its present form in the late 19th century for the Teutonic Order
- Buchlov, a royal castle in the Chřiby highlands in the Zlín Region, founded in the first half of the 13th century
- Vranov nad Dyjí Castle, a Baroque castle above the Thaya river near the Austrian border

=== Nature and caves ===
- Moravian Karst, a protected landscape area north of Brno with roughly 1,100 caverns and gorges across some 92 km^{2}, of which five cave systems are open to the public, including the Punkva Caves
- Macocha Gorge, a sinkhole in the Moravian Karst 138.5 m deep, the deepest of its kind in Central Europe
- Podyjí National Park, one of the Czech Republic's four national parks, protecting near-natural forest along the Thaya river valley and adjoining Austria's Thayatal National Park
- Pálava Protected Landscape Area, a UNESCO biosphere reserve on the Austrian border, whose highest point is Děvín at 550 m
- Hranice Abyss, the deepest known underwater cave in the world

== See also ==
- Extreme points of Moravia
- Flag of Moravia
- German South Moravia
- Moravian traditional music
