= Nová Cerekev =

Market town in the Vysočina Region, Czech Republic

- Market town
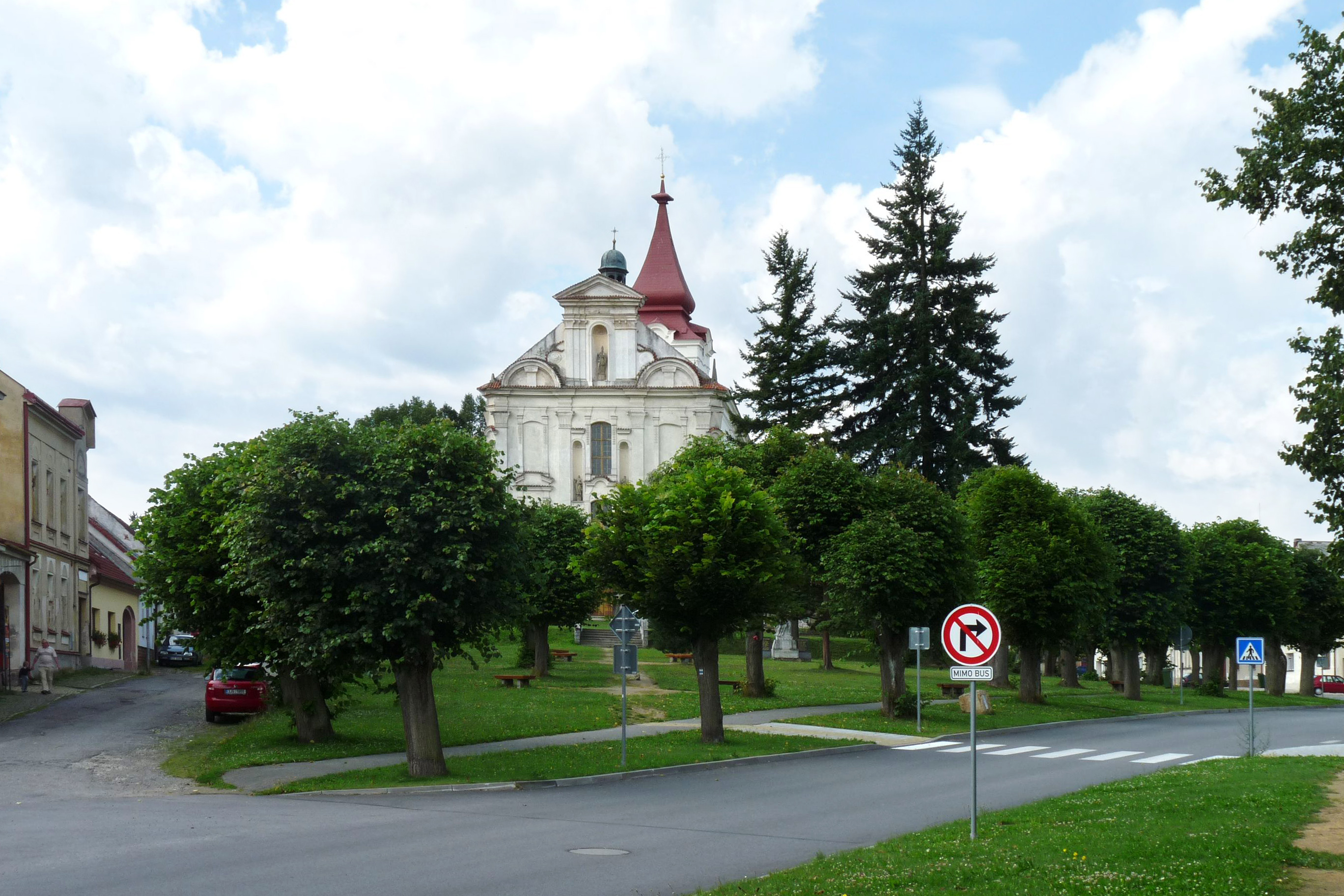
- Centre of Nová Cerekev

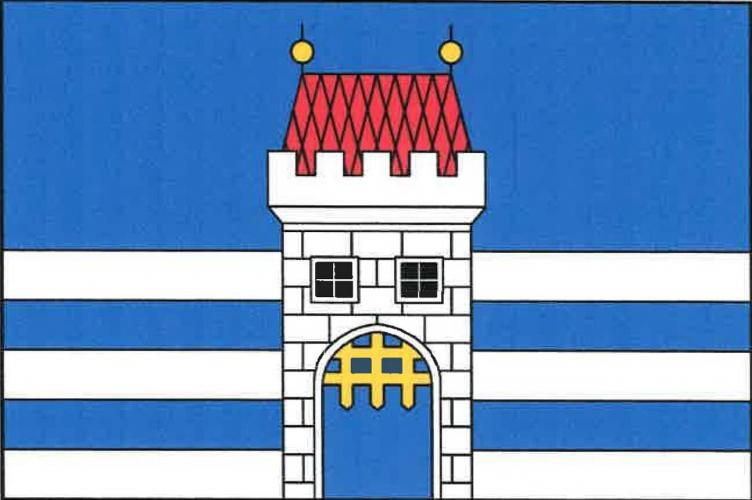
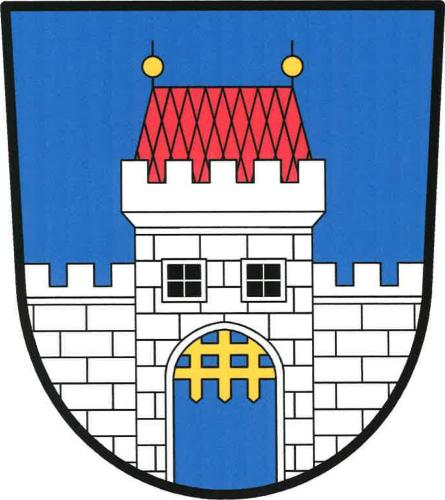
- Flag Coat of arms

- Location in the Czech Republic
- Coordinates: 49°25′2″N 15°7′0″E
- Country: Czech Republic
- Region: Vysočina
- District: Pelhřimov
- First mentioned: 1330

Area
  - Total: 35.18 km^{2} (13.58 sq mi)
- Elevation: 560 m (1,840 ft)

Population (2026-01-01)
  - Total: 1,196
  - Density: 34.00/km^{2} (88.05/sq mi)
- Time zone: UTC+1 (CET)
  - Summer (DST): UTC+2 (CEST)
- Postal codes: 393 01, 394 15, 394 70
- Website: www.novacerekev.cz

Nová Cerekev (Czech pronunciation: [ˈnovaː ˈtsɛrɛkɛf]; German: Neu Cerekwe, Neu Zerekwe) is a market town in Pelhřimov District in the Vysočina Region of the Czech Republic. It has about 1,200 inhabitants.

== Administrative division ==
Nová Cerekev consists of seven municipal parts (in brackets population according to the 2021 census):

- Nová Cerekev (720)
- Částkovice (84)
- Chmelná (31)
- Markvarec (53)
- Myslov (24)
- Proseč-Obořiště (185)
- Stanovice (55)

== Etymology ==
The name Cerekev is derived from cierkev, which is an old Czech term for a wooden church. The prefix nová ('new') was added to distinguish it from Dolní Cerekev and Horní Cerekev and suggests that Nová Cerekev was founded after these two.

== Geography ==
Nová Cerekev is located about 8 kilometres (5 mi) west of Pelhřimov and 33 km (21 mi) west of Jihlava. It lies in the Křemešník Highlands. The highest point is at 690 m (2,260 ft) above sea level. The stream Cerekvický potok flows through the market town.

A notable body of water is the fishpond Hejlovský rybník, located near the village of Částkovice. It has an area of 24 ha (59 acres).

== History ==
The first written mention of Nová Cerekev is from 1330.

Nová Cerekev had a Jewish population. The first Jews appeared in Nová Cerekev in 1570. The Jewish community was established around 1690. The first synagogue was built at the beginning of the 18th century. The population of Jews reached its peak in 1895, when there were 109 of them. But since then, their number was decreasing, and before World War II there were only 20 Jews.

== Demographics ==
Historical population

Year	Pop.	±%
1869	2,407	—
1880	2,504	+4.0%
1890	2,471	−1.3%
1900	2,344	−5.1%
1910	2,302	−1.8%

Year	Pop.	±%
1921	2,284	−0.8%
1930	2,094	−8.3%
1950	1,730	−17.4%
1961	1,685	−2.6%
1970	1,494	−11.3%

Year	Pop.	±%
1980	1,403	−6.1%
1991	1,213	−13.5%
2001	1,183	−2.5%
2011	1,122	−5.2%
2021	1,152	+2.7%

Source: Censuses

== Transport ==
The I/19 road (the section from Tábor to Pelhřimov) runs along the northern municipal border.

Nová Cerekev is located on the railway line Jihlava–Tábor.

== Sights ==
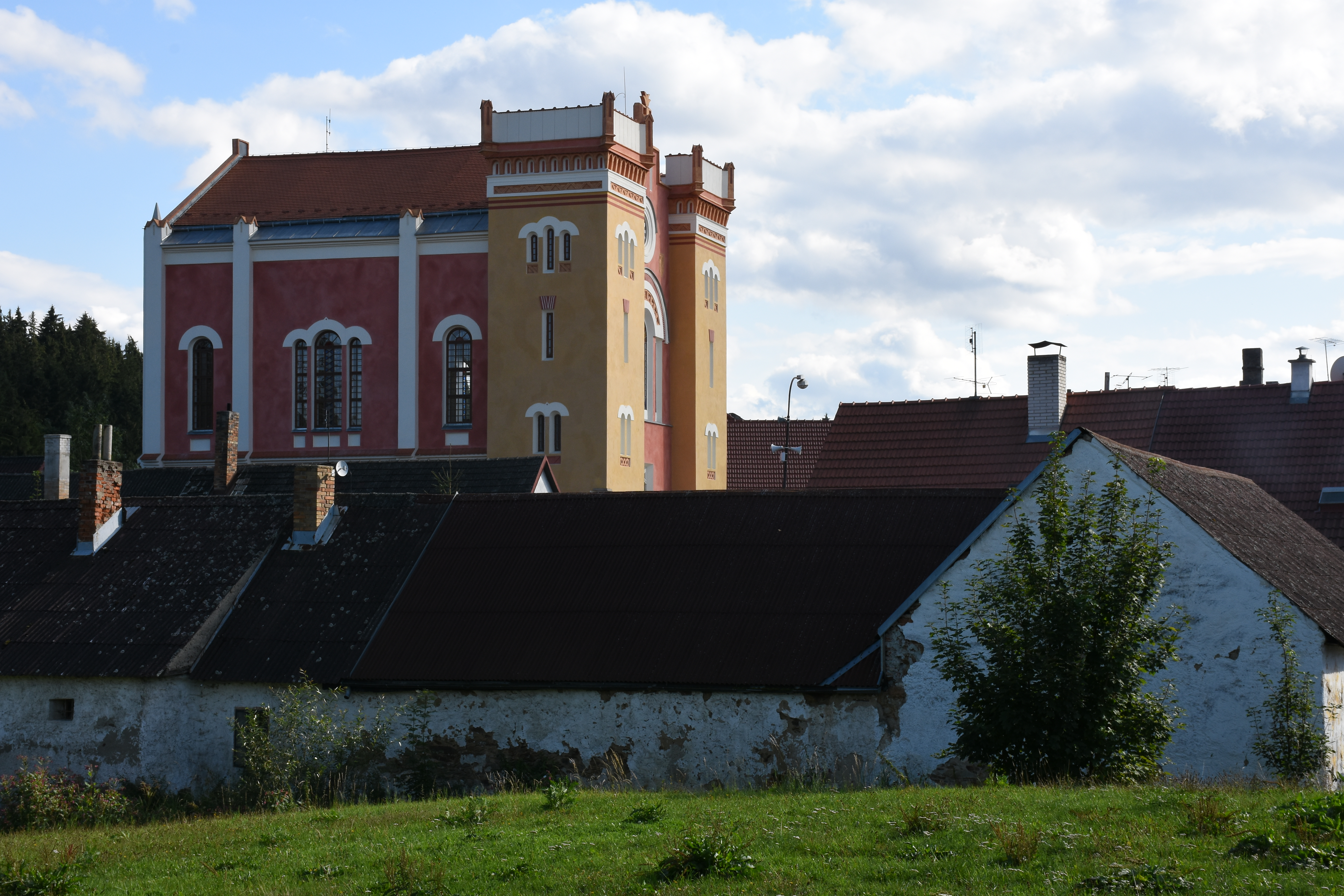
Synagogue

Among the main landmarks of Nová Cerekev is the Church of Saint Thomas Becket. It was built in the Baroque style in 1750–1760. It was built on the site of an old Gothic church, from which the tower has been preserved.

The synagogue is a large building, which is among the most notable Jewish monuments in the region. It was built in 1855, when it replaced an older wooden synagogue. It was built in the Neo-Romanesque style, imitating Assyrian-Babylonian architecture, and is the only one of its kind in Central Europe. Today the building is owned by the Jewish Community of Prague and houses a permanent exhibition focused on the architecture of synagogues in the Czech lands. The Old Jewish Cemetery from the 17th century and the New Jewish Cemetery, founded in 1866, also belong to the synagogue. The oldest preserved tombstone dates from 1692.

The Nová Cerekev Castle is a Baroque building, created by reconstruction of a Renaissance fortress. Today it serves as a retirement home.

== Notable people ==
- Alfréd Justitz (1879–1934), painter and illustrator
- Otto Šling (1912–1952), communist politician
