= Věžná =

Věžná may refer to places in the Czech Republic:

- Věžná (Pelhřimov District), a municipality and village in the Vysočina Region
- Věžná (Žďár nad Sázavou District), a municipality and village in the Vysočina Region
