= Alfréd Justitz =

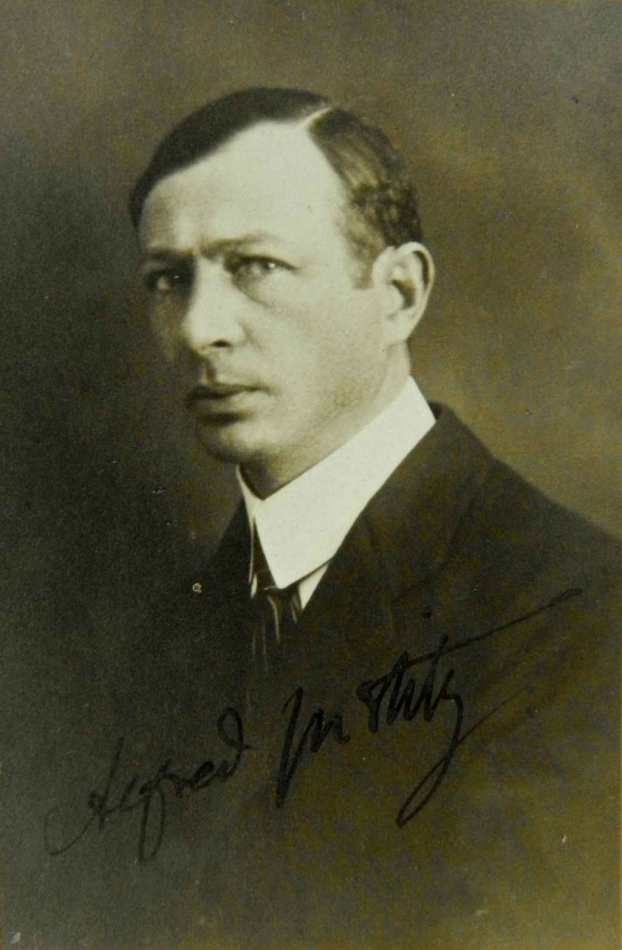
Alfréd Justitz (1919), from the Jewish Museum in Prague

Alfréd Justitz (19 July 1879 – 9 February 1934) was a Czech Modernist painter and illustrator.

== Biography ==
Justitz was born on 19 July 1879 in Nová Cerekev, Bohemia. He was one of three sons born into a Jewish family; their father was a medical doctor and their mother a homemaker. His first contact with art came in Jihlava, where he met the aspiring painter, Roman Havelka, who was two years his senior.

As a result, Justitz decided to pursue a creative career and began by studying architecture at the Czech Technical University in Prague with Professor Jan Kotěra. He transferred to the Academy of Fine Arts, where he studied with Maximilian Pirner and Franz Thiele. After that, he worked with Ludwig Schmid-Reutte in Karlsruhe and Wilhelm Trübner in Berlin.

In 1910, he visited Paris, where he was influenced by the works of Paul Cézanne and Honoré Daumier. From 1918 to 1924, he exhibited with "Tvrdošíjní", a group of mostly young, modern artists. Later, he would create posters for galleries and stores. In 1927, he produced illustrations for the Czech edition of Notre-Dame de Paris by Victor Hugo. The following year, he joined the Mánes Union of Fine Arts.

In addition to painting, Justitz loved dogs and was an enthusiastic promoter and breeder of boxers. He became a trustee of the "ČeskoMoravská Kynologická Unie" (a kennel club), where he was put in charge of maintaining the breeding records. He was also an active Freemason of the lodge "Sibi et Posteris" in Prague.

He died on 9 February 1934 at a hospital in Bratislava, after a long illness. His ashes were returned to his hometown and placed in an urn at the Jewish cemetery in Nová Cerekev. The Masonic Lodge provided support for his widow Anna, but she never recovered from his death. She committed suicide by poisoning not long after the German Occupation in 1939, when the threat of the Nazis to Jews was obvious.

== Selected paintings ==
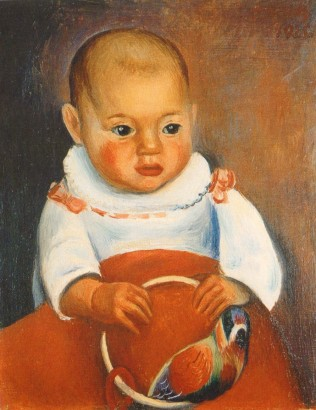
Portrait of a Child

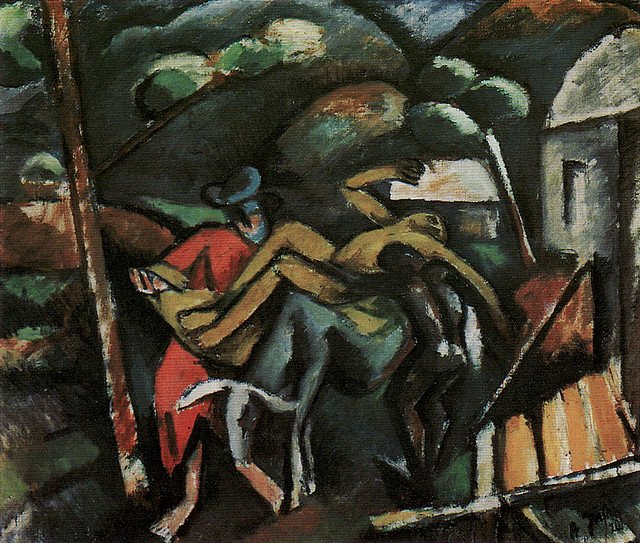
The Good Samaritan

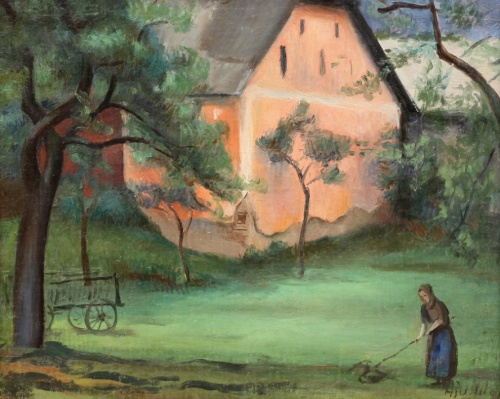
The Pink House

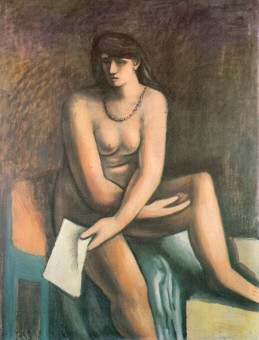
Bathsheba

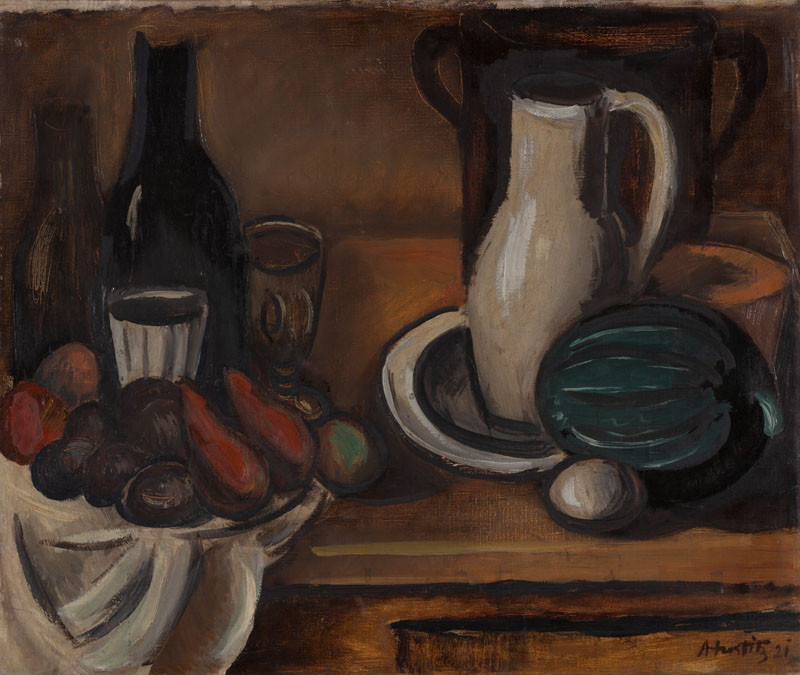
Still Life with a Watermelon
