= Nový Rychnov =

- Market town
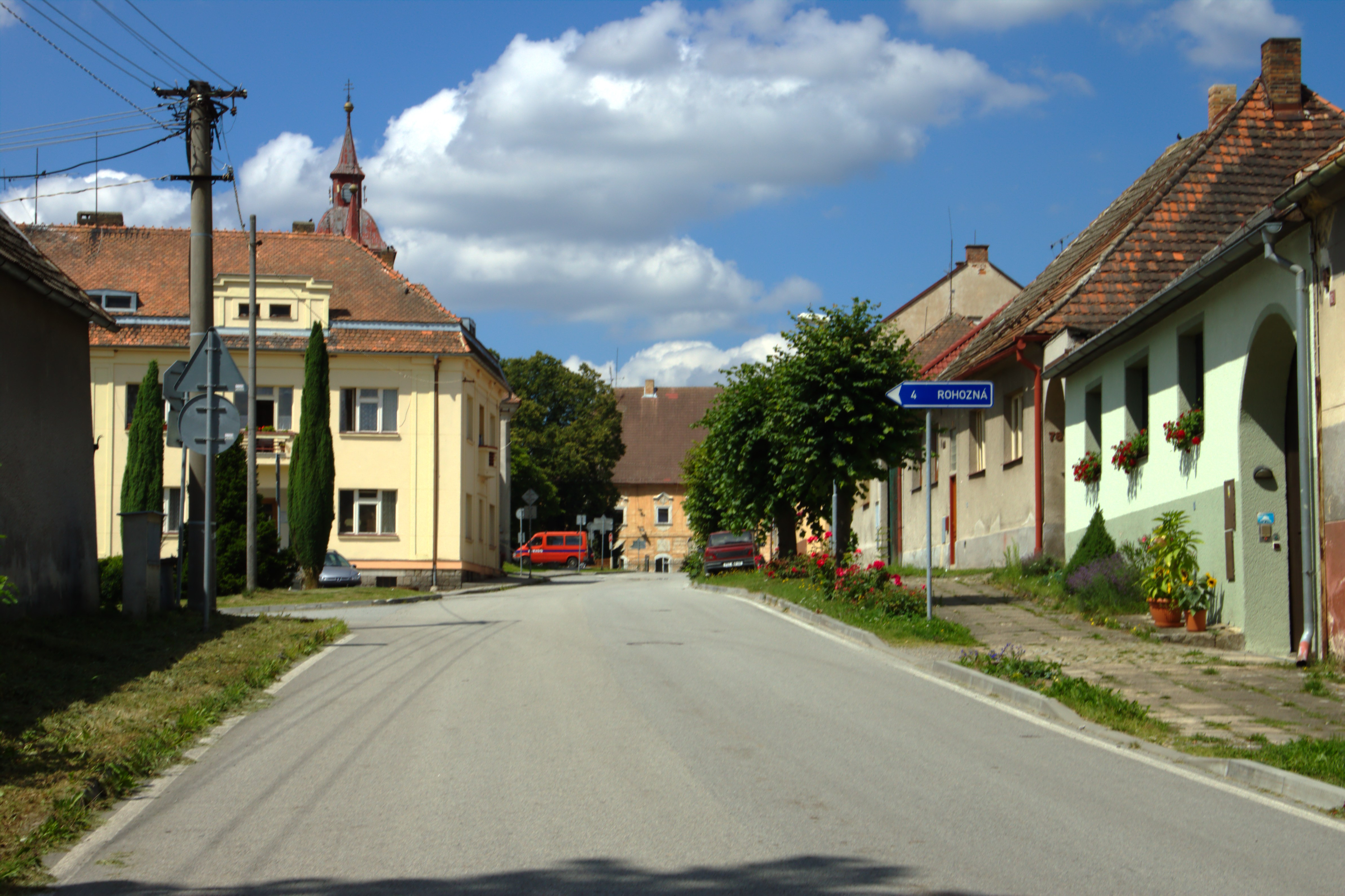
- Eastern part of Nový Rychnov

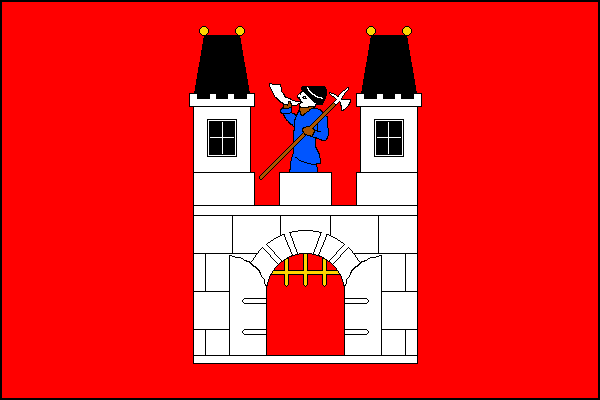
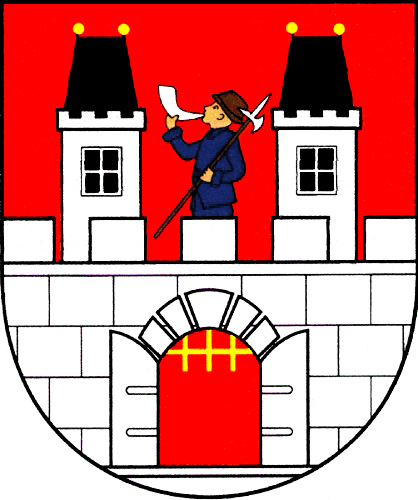
- Flag Coat of arms

- Location in the Czech Republic
- Coordinates: 49°23′0″N 15°21′58″E
- Country: Czech Republic
- Region: Vysočina
- District: Pelhřimov
- First mentioned: 1352

Area
  - Total: 31.00 km^{2} (11.97 sq mi)
- Elevation: 596 m (1,955 ft)

Population (2026-01-01)
  - Total: 985
  - Density: 31.8/km^{2} (82.3/sq mi)
- Time zone: UTC+1 (CET)
  - Summer (DST): UTC+2 (CEST)
- Postal code: 393 01, 394 04
- Website: www.novyrychnov.cz

Nový Rychnov (Czech pronunciation: [ˈnoviː ˈrɪxnof]; German: Neu Reichenau) is a market town in Pelhřimov District in the Vysočina Region of the Czech Republic. It has about 1,000 inhabitants.

== Administrative division ==
Nový Rychnov consists of seven municipal parts (in brackets population according to the 2021 census):

- Nový Rychnov (690)
- Čejkov (78)
- Chaloupky (30)
- Křemešník (6)
- Řeženčice (54)
- Sázava (136)
- Trsov (3)

== Etymology ==
The name Rychnov is derived from the German word Rauchenau, which meant 'in the rich floodplain'. The prefix nový means 'new'.

== Geography ==
Nový Rychnov is located about 11 kilometres (7 mi) southeast of Pelhřimov and 15 km (9 mi) west of Jihlava. It lies in the Křemešník Highlands. The highest point is the mountain Křemešník at 765 m (2,510 ft) above sea level, which is the highest peak of the entire Křemešník Highlands.

== History ==
The first written mention of Nový Rychnov is from 1352, when it was part of the Červená Řečice estate. Until the Hussite Wars, it was owned by the Prague archbishopric, then it was a property of various noble families. In 1543, during the rule of the Leskovec family, it became a separate estate. They had built here a Renaissance castle. In 1597–1623, Nový Rychnov was owned by the Lords of Říčany. After the properties of Jan of Říčany were confiscated as a result of the Battle of White Mountain, Nový Rychnov became again a property of the Prague archbishopric.

== Demographics ==
Historical population

Year	Pop.	±%
1869	2,079	—
1880	2,064	−0.7%
1890	2,088	+1.2%
1900	1,953	−6.5%
1910	1,907	−2.4%

Year	Pop.	±%
1921	1,836	−3.7%
1930	1,590	−13.4%
1950	1,266	−20.4%
1961	1,318	+4.1%
1970	1,136	−13.8%

Year	Pop.	±%
1980	1,061	−6.6%
1991	1,014	−4.4%
2001	957	−5.6%
2011	991	+3.6%
2021	997	+0.6%

Source: Censuses

== Transport ==
There are no railways or major roads passing through the municipality.

== Sights ==
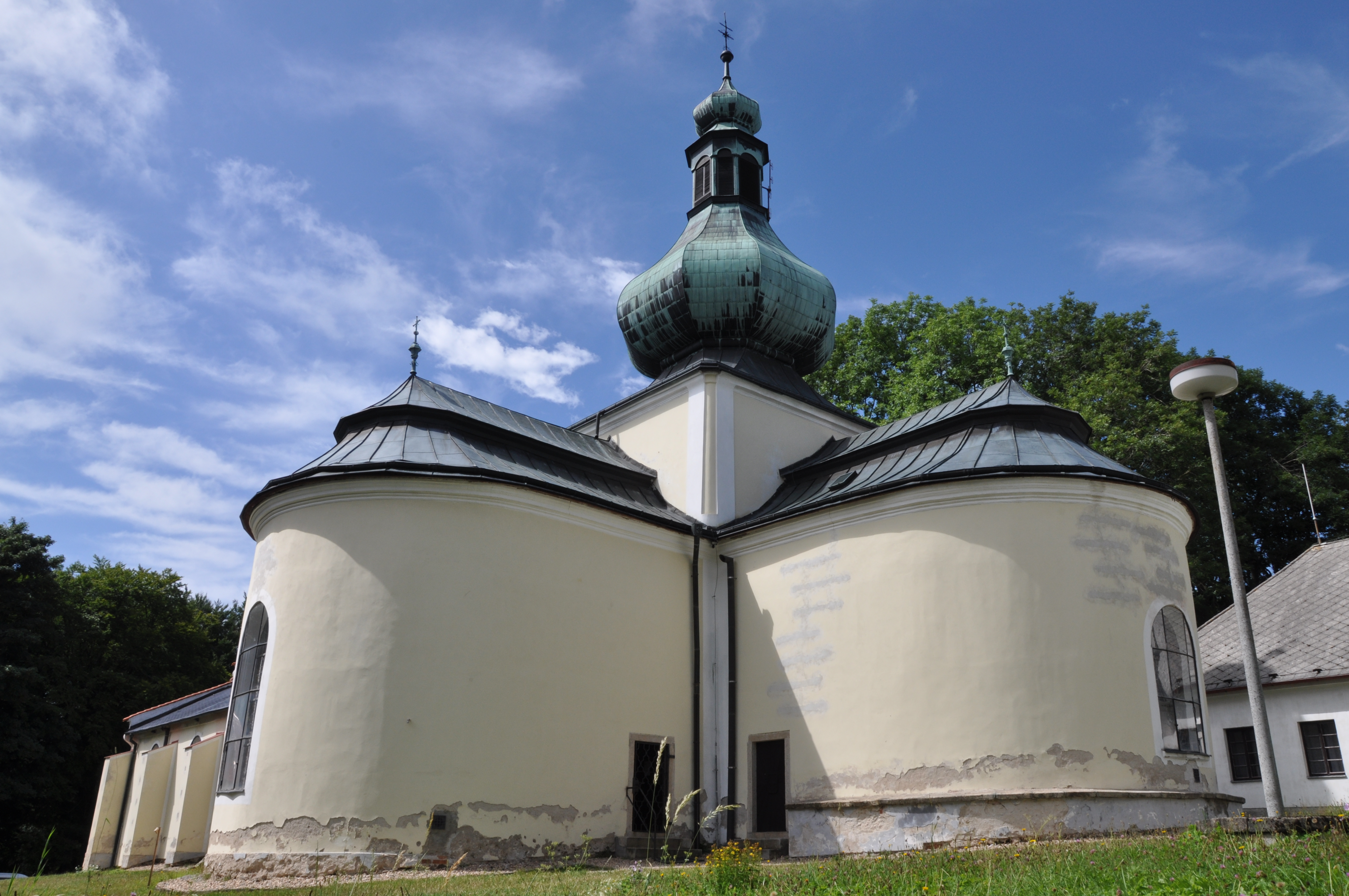
Church of the Holy Trinity

The main landmark of Nový Rychnov is the Church of the Assumption of the Virgin Mary. It is originally a Gothic church, rebuilt in the Baroque style.

The Nový Rychnov Castle was originally a Gothic fortress from the 14th century, rebuilt into a Renaissance castle. After the castle was destroyed by the Swedish army during the Thirty Years' War, it was rebuilt into a Baroque residence of the Prague archbishops.

There is a pilgrimage site with the Church of the Holy Trinity on the mountain Křemešník. The pilgrimage tradition was established in the mid-16th century. The church was built in the early Baroque style in 1652, on the side of an old wooden chapel. In 1730–1752, it was modified and extended.
