= Chýstovice =

- Municipality
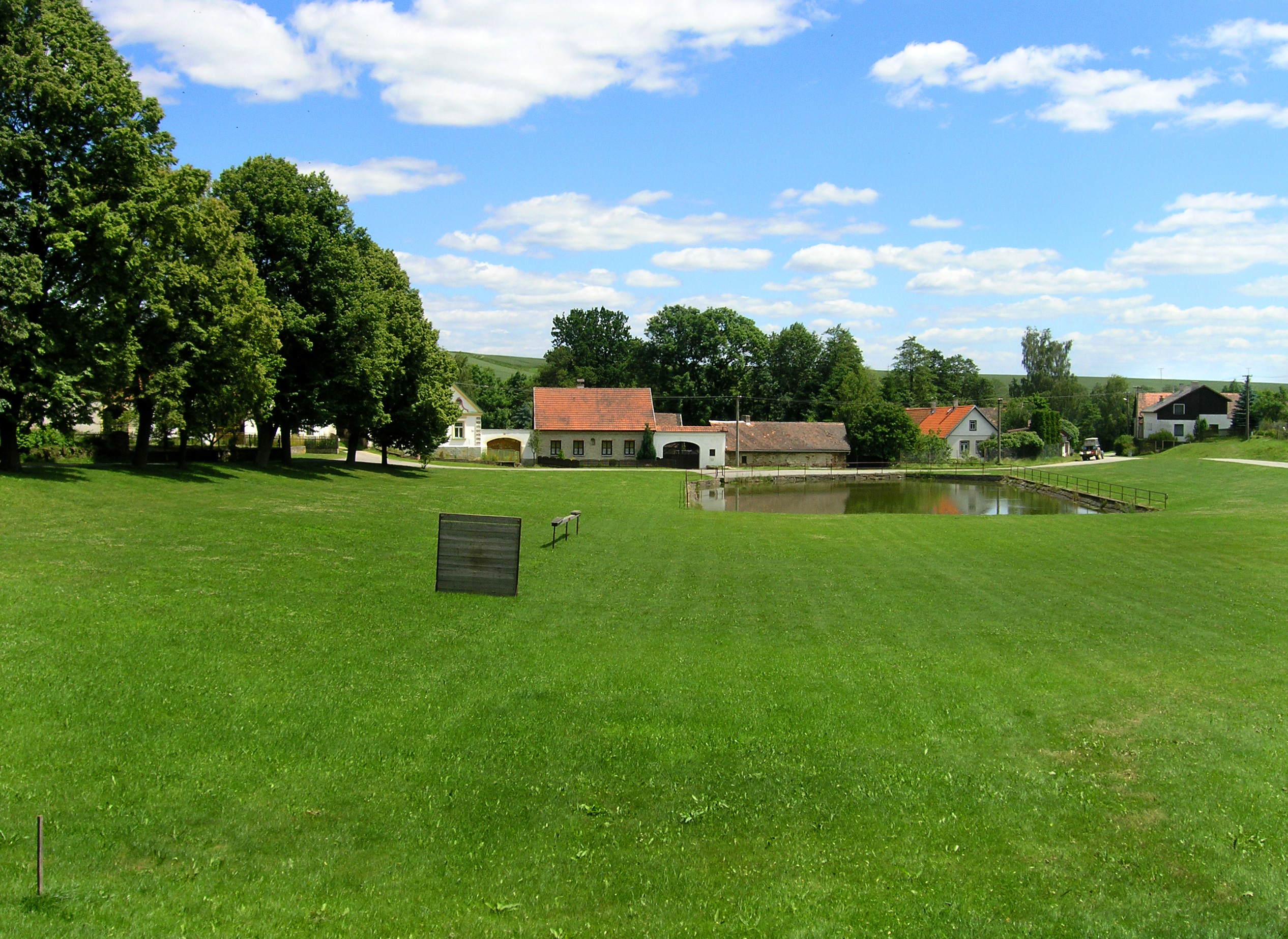
- Centre of Chýstovice

- Location in the Czech Republic
- Coordinates: 49°35′9″N 15°4′47″E
- Country: Czech Republic
- Region: Vysočina
- District: Pelhřimov
- First mentioned: 1360

Area
  - Total: 5.20 km^{2} (2.01 sq mi)
- Elevation: 507 m (1,663 ft)

Population (2026-01-01)
  - Total: 44
  - Density: 8.5/km^{2} (22/sq mi)
- Time zone: UTC+1 (CET)
  - Summer (DST): UTC+2 (CEST)
- Postal code: 395 01
- Website: www.chystovice.cz

Chýstovice is a municipality and village in Pelhřimov District in the Vysočina Region of the Czech Republic. It has about 40 inhabitants.

== Administrative division ==
Chýstovice consists of two municipal parts (in brackets population according to the 2021 census):

- Chýstovice (30)
- Jedlina (9)

== Geography ==
Chýstovice is located about 20 kilometres (12 mi) northwest of Pelhřimov and 41 km (25 mi) northwest of Jihlava. It lies in the Křemešník Highlands. The highest point is at 570 m (1,870 ft) above sea level. The stream Martinický potok flows along the southern municipal border.

== History ==
The first written mention of Chýstovice is from 1360. The village was founded around a guardhouse, which stood by the road to Prague.

== Demographics ==
Historical population

Year	Pop.	±%
1869	327	—
1880	335	+2.4%
1890	305	−9.0%
1900	269	−11.8%
1910	322	+19.7%

Year	Pop.	±%
1921	324	+0.6%
1930	274	−15.4%
1950	192	−29.9%
1961	145	−24.5%
1970	127	−12.4%

Year	Pop.	±%
1980	93	−26.8%
1991	70	−24.7%
2001	53	−24.3%
2011	24	−54.7%
2021	39	+62.5%

Source: Censuses

== Transport ==
There are no railways or major roads passing through the municipality.

== Sights ==
There are no protected cultural monuments in the municipality.
