= Dolní Cerekev =

- Market town
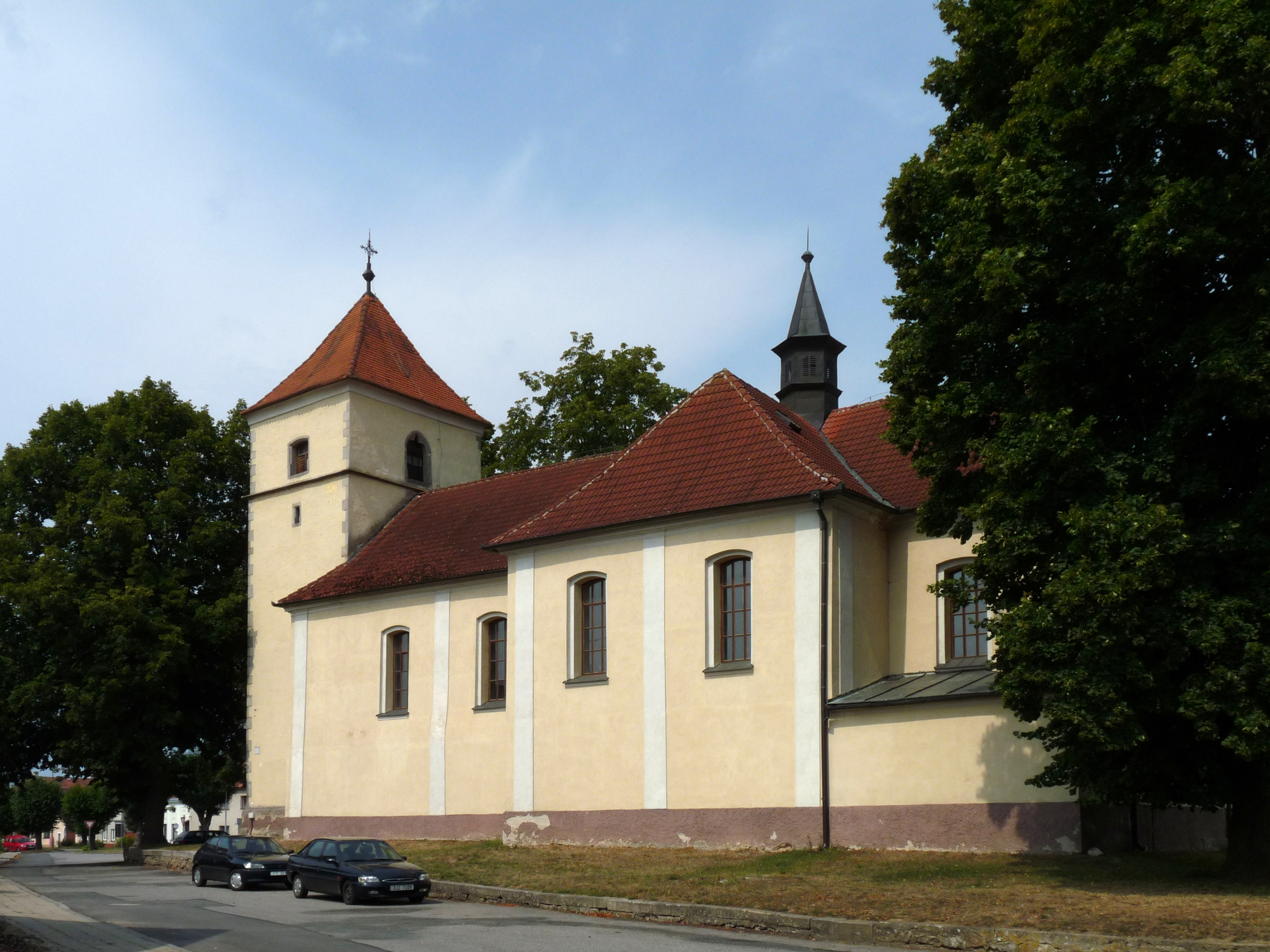
- Church of Saint Mary Magdalene

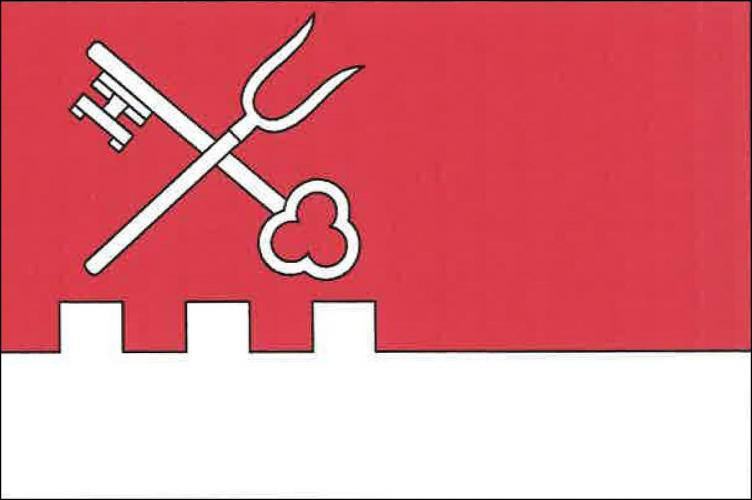
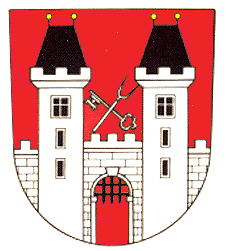
- Flag Coat of arms

- Location in the Czech Republic
- Coordinates: 49°20′40″N 15°27′24″E
- Country: Czech Republic
- Region: Vysočina
- District: Jihlava
- First mentioned: 1352

Area
  - Total: 15.85 km^{2} (6.12 sq mi)
- Elevation: 528 m (1,732 ft)

Population (2026-01-01)
  - Total: 1,245
  - Density: 78.55/km^{2} (203.4/sq mi)
- Time zone: UTC+1 (CET)
  - Summer (DST): UTC+2 (CEST)
- Postal codes: 588 45, 588 51
- Website: www.dolnicerekev.cz

Dolní Cerekev (Czech pronunciation: [ˈdolɲiː ˈtsɛrɛkɛf]; German: Unter Zerekwe) is a market town in Jihlava District in the Vysočina Region of the Czech Republic. It has about 1,200 inhabitants.

== Administrative division ==
Dolní Cerekev consists of three municipal parts (in brackets population according to the 2021 census):

- Dolní Cerekev (890)
- Nový Svět (252)
- Spělov (76)

== Etymology ==
The name Cerekev is derived from cierkev, which is an Old Czech term for a wooden church. The prefix dolní ('lower') was added to distinguish it from Horní Cerekev ('upper Cerekev').

== Geography ==
Dolní Cerekev is located about 10 kilometres (6 mi) southwest of Jihlava. It lies on the border between the Křemešník Highlands and Křižanov Highlands. The highest point is at 603 m (1,978 ft) above sea level. The Jihlava River flows through the market town.

== History ==
According to a local chronicler from the 18th century, Dolní Cerekev was founded in 1224, but there is no evidence for this. The first trustworthy written mention of Dolní Cerekev is from 1352. Among the most important owners of the village were the Leskovec family, who acquired the village in the 15th century. They had built here a fortress, which was first documented in 1552. At the beginning of the Thirty Years' War, Dolní Cerekev became a property of the archbishopric of Prague.

In 1832, Dolní Cerekev was hit by a cholera epidemic, which killed over 100 inhabitants. Development stagnated until the second half of the 19th century, when the Jihlava–Veselí nad Lužnicí railway began operating.

From 1910 to 1980, Spělov was an independent municipality and the village of Nový Svět was its municipal part. On 1 April 1980, Spělov and Nový Svět were annexed to Nová Cerekev.

== Demographics ==
Historical population

Year	Pop.	±%
1869	1,490	—
1880	1,489	−0.1%
1890	1,523	+2.3%
1900	1,507	−1.1%
1910	1,568	+4.0%

Year	Pop.	±%
1921	1,431	−8.7%
1930	1,334	−6.8%
1950	1,064	−20.2%
1961	1,096	+3.0%
1970	1,027	−6.3%

Year	Pop.	±%
1980	956	−6.9%
1991	959	+0.3%
2001	1,103	+15.0%
2011	1,275	+15.6%
2021	1,218	−4.5%

Source: Censuses

== Transport ==
Dolní Cerekev is located on the main railway lines Brno–Plzeň and Jihlava–Tábor.

== Sights ==
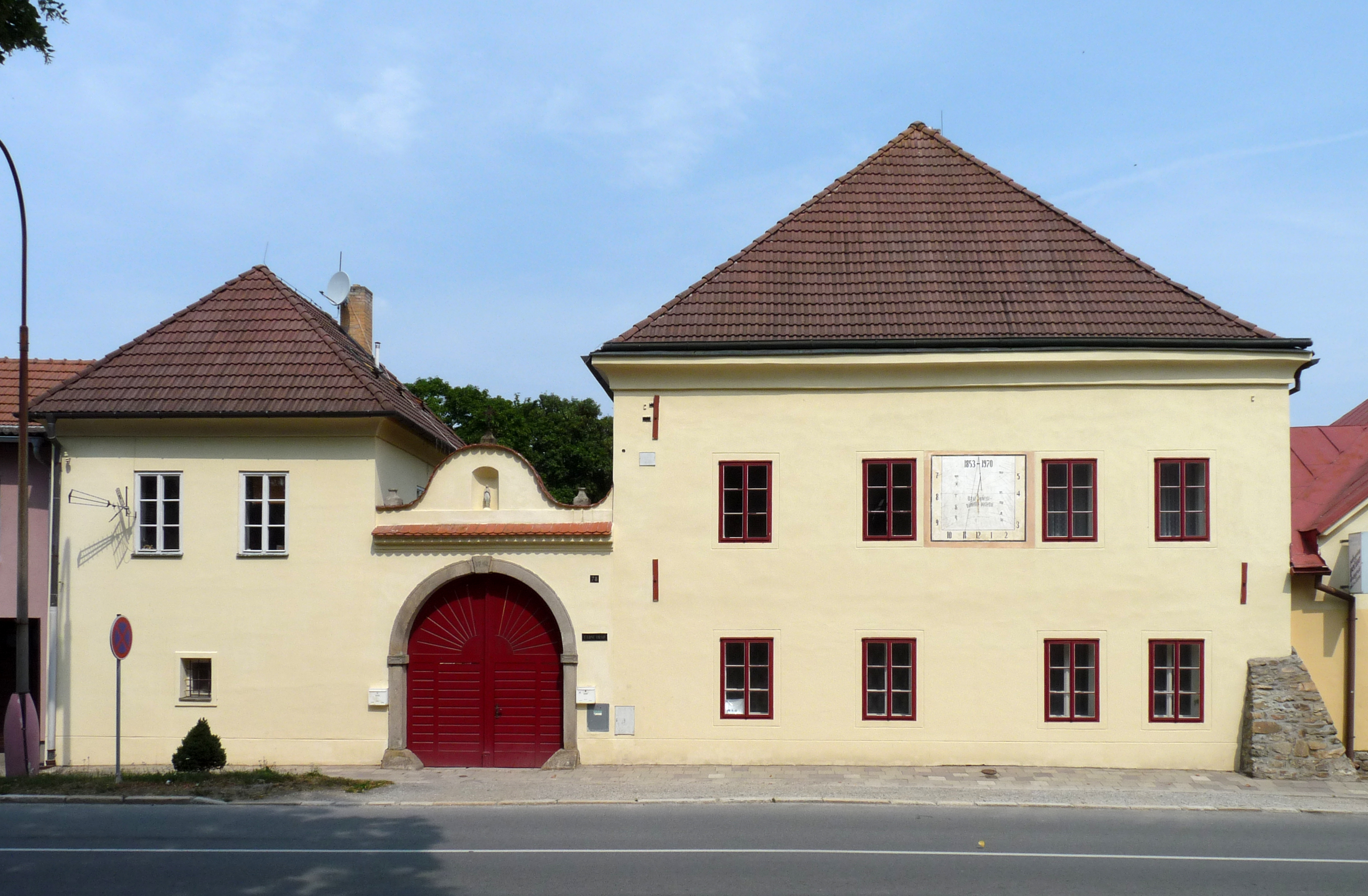
Rectory

The main landmark of Dolní Cerekev is the Church of Saint Mary Magdalene. It is a Neoclassical building with an early Gothic core from the 13th century and with a late Gothic tower.

The second notable building is the rectory. It was built in the Baroque style in 1742. The façade of the rectory is decorated with a sundial.

A cultural monument is the stone column with a statue of Saint John of Nepomuk, which dates from 1715.
