= Křemešník =

Mountain in Nový Rychnov, Czech Republic

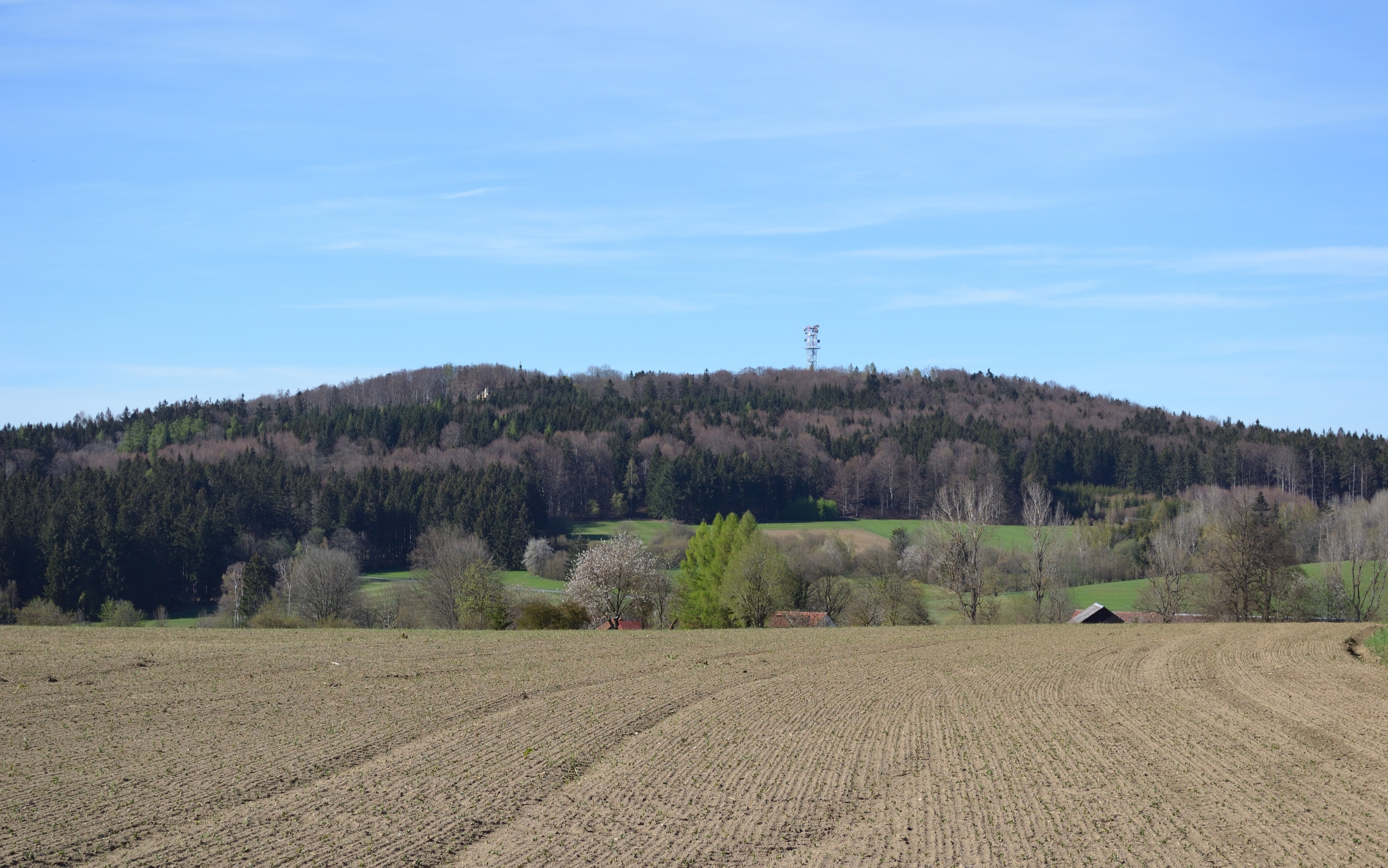
- View from the south

Highest point
- Elevation: 769 m (2,523 ft)
- Prominence: 116 m (381 ft)
- Isolation: 16.3 km (10.1 mi)
- Coordinates: 49°24′14″N 15°19′39″E

Geography
- Location within Czech Republic
- Location: Vysočina Region of the Czech Republic
- Parent range: Křemešník Highlands

Křemešník is a mountain in the municipality of Nový Rychnov in the Vysočina Region of the Czech Republic. The mountain lies near the town of Pelhřimov and is part of Bohemian-Moravian Highlands. With an elevation of 769 metres (2,523 ft) above sea level, it is the highest mountain of the Křemešník Highlands.

== History ==
The mountain was a traditional gathering place for pilgrims. In 1710–1720, a Baroque-style church was built on the top of the mountain (extending an older, Gothic church building from 1555). Stations of the Cross has been built as well.

During the 15th century, a silver mine existed there.

Next to the spring with slightly radioactive water lies a small chapel from 1689. According to legend, the spring has miraculous healing abilities. A 52-meter-high steel view-tower called Pípalka was erected here. A small but unfinished romantic-style villa-castelet Větrný zámek from 1930 lies next to the church.

The sculptor Josef Šejnost created a coin museum at the Windmill House in the town in 1939.

== Tourism ==
There is a infrastructure for tourism including a hotel, ski-lift and tourist pathway.
