= Věžná (Pelhřimov District) =

- Municipality
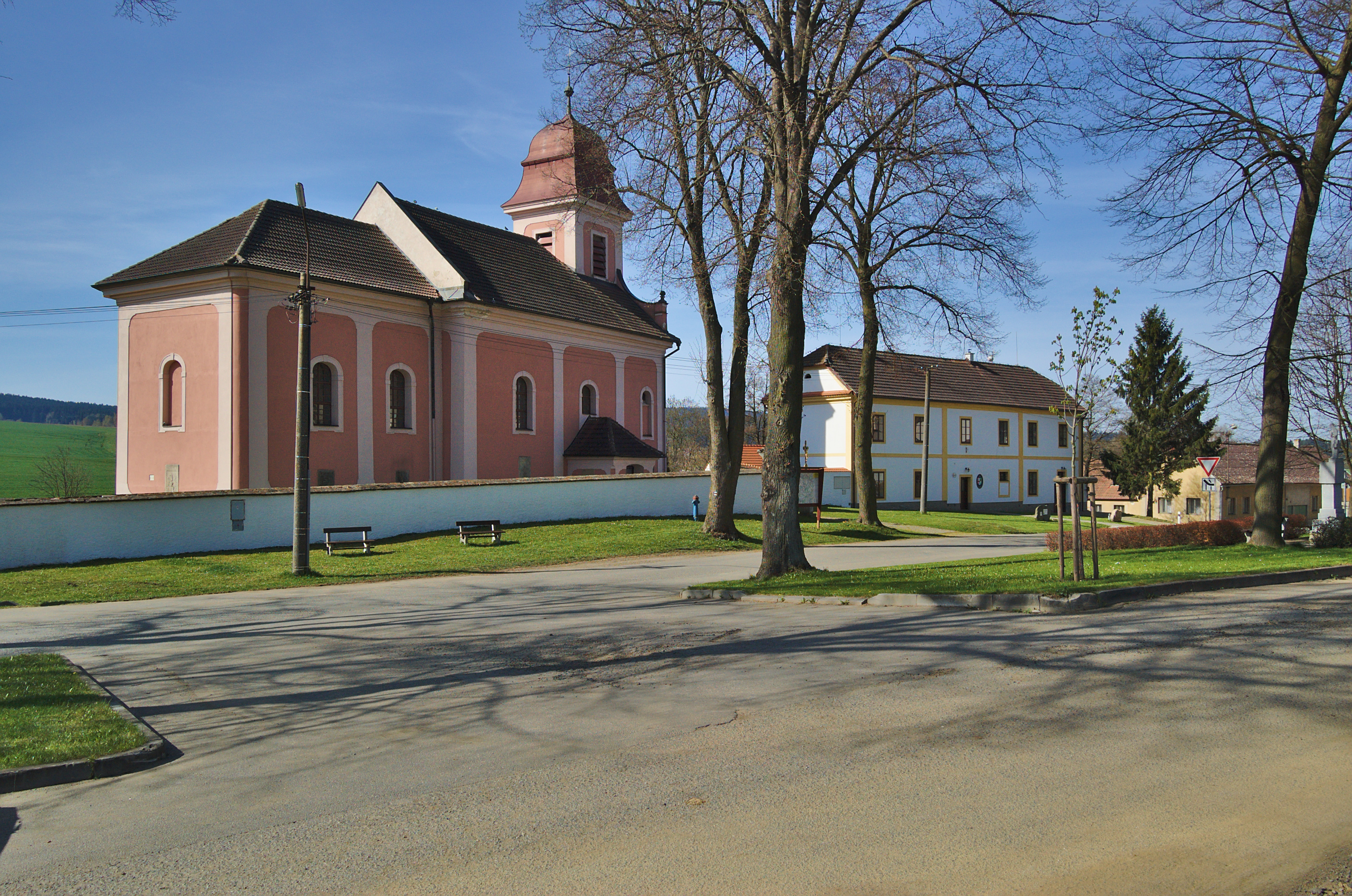
- Church of Saint George and rectory

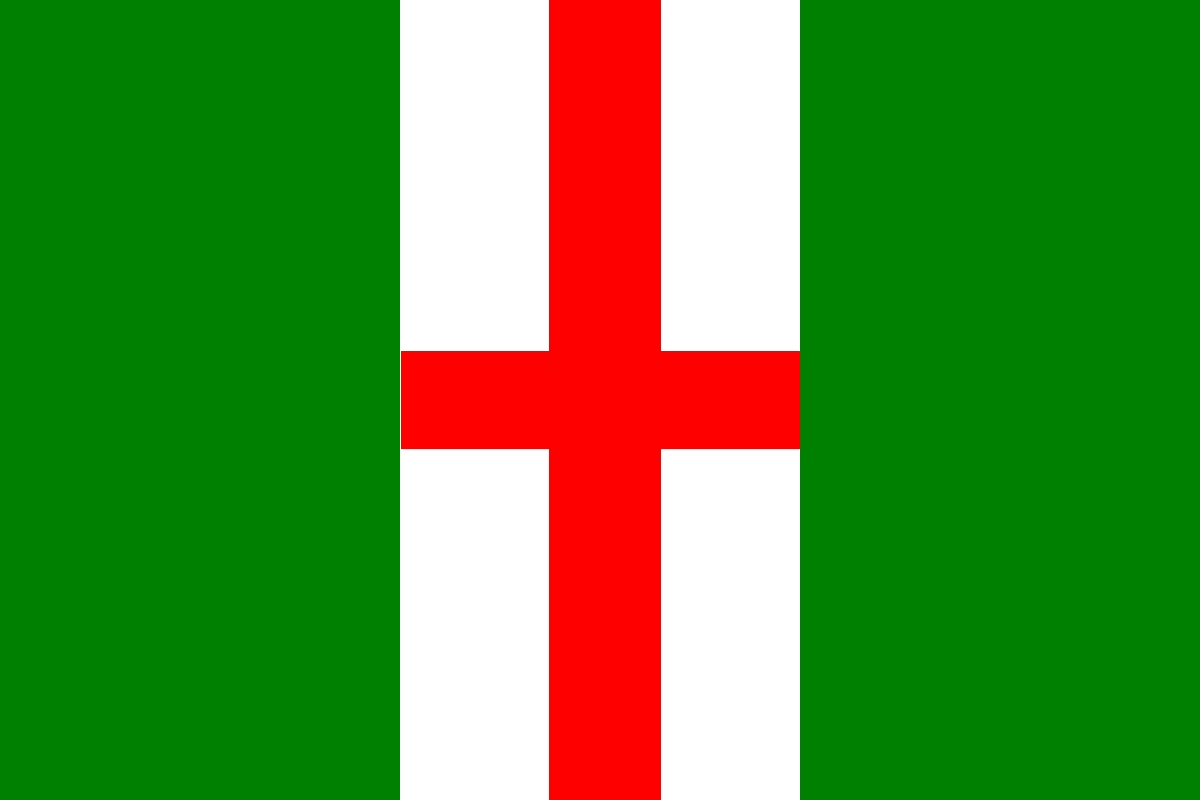
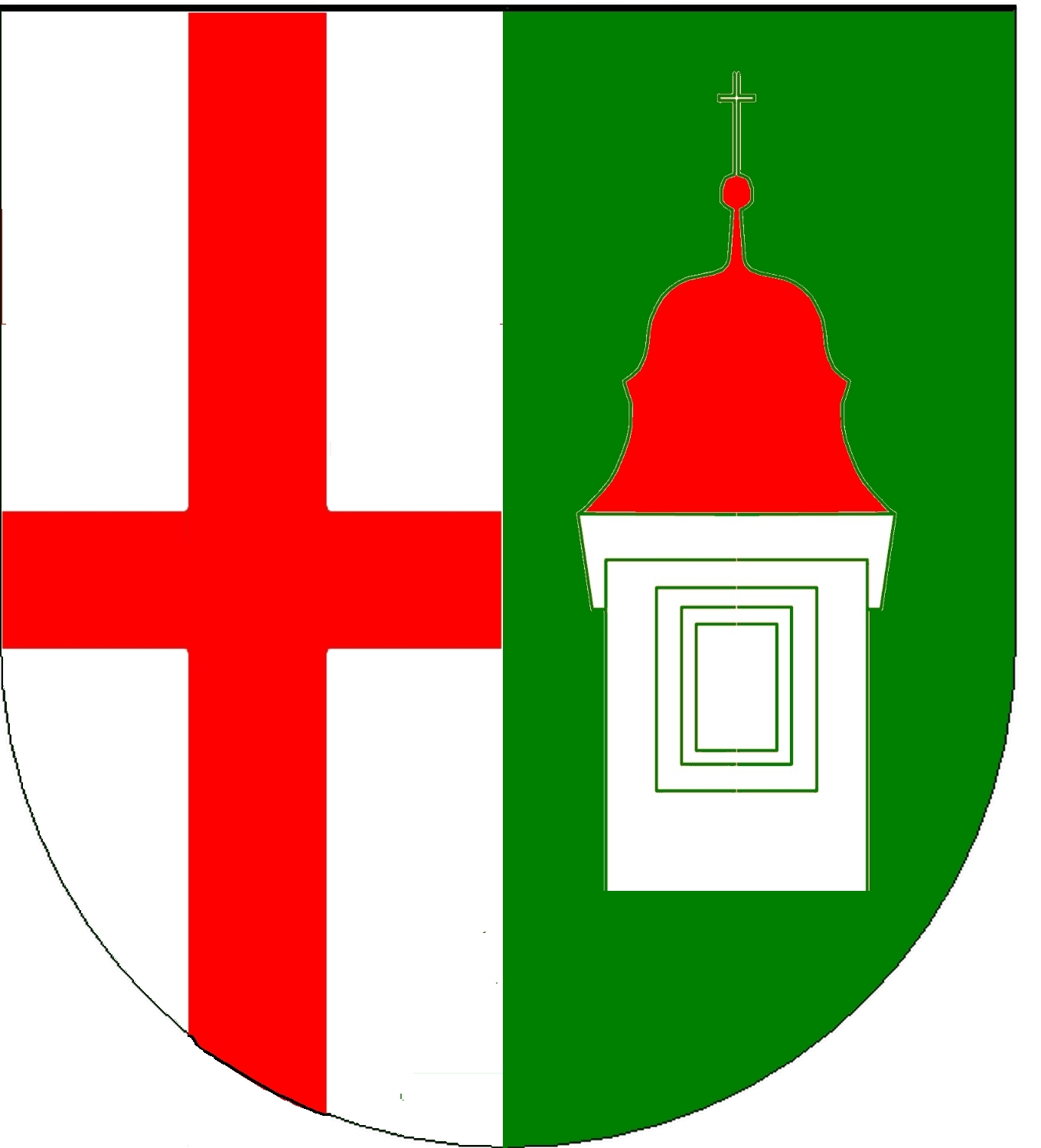
- Flag Coat of arms

- Location in the Czech Republic
- Coordinates: 49°24′51″N 14°59′20″E
- Country: Czech Republic
- Region: Vysočina
- District: Pelhřimov
- First mentioned: 1318

Area
  - Total: 5.40 km^{2} (2.08 sq mi)
- Elevation: 566 m (1,857 ft)

Population (2026-01-01)
  - Total: 138
  - Density: 25.6/km^{2} (66.2/sq mi)
- Time zone: UTC+1 (CET)
  - Summer (DST): UTC+2 (CEST)
- Postal code: 395 01
- Website: www.vezna.cz

Věžná is a municipality and village in Pelhřimov District in the Vysočina Region of the Czech Republic. It has about 100 inhabitants.

== Administrative division ==
Věžná consists of two municipal parts (in brackets population according to the 2021 census):

- Věžná (88)
- Brná (40)

== Etymology ==
The name Věžná is derived from the Czech word věž ('tower'). The village was probably founded near some tower.

== Geography ==
Věžná is located about 17 kilometres (11 mi) west of Pelhřimov and 42 km (26 mi) west of Jihlava. It lies in the Křemešník Highlands. The highest point is at 636 m (2,087 ft) above sea level.

== History ==
The first written mention of Věžná is from 1318. Brná was first mentioned in 1542. The Church of Saint George was first documented in 1358.

== Demographics ==
Historical population

Year	Pop.	±%
1869	370	—
1880	382	+3.2%
1890	372	−2.6%
1900	349	−6.2%
1910	365	+4.6%

Year	Pop.	±%
1921	360	−1.4%
1930	332	−7.8%
1950	233	−29.8%
1961	213	−8.6%
1970	176	−17.4%

Year	Pop.	±%
1980	163	−7.4%
1991	138	−15.3%
2001	104	−24.6%
2011	120	+15.4%
2021	128	+6.7%

Source: Censuses

== Transport ==
The I/19 road (the section from Tábor to Pelhřimov) runs through the northern part of the municipality.

== Sights ==
The main landmark of Věžná is the Church of Saint George. It was built in the Baroque style in 1733–1734 on the foundations of an older medieval building.
