= Josef Šejnost =

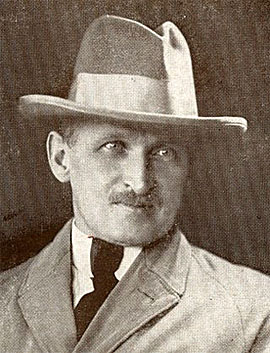
Josef Šejnost

Josef Šejnost (30 May 1878 – 9 February 1941) was a Czech sculptor and coin designer, specialising in low relief work.

== Life ==
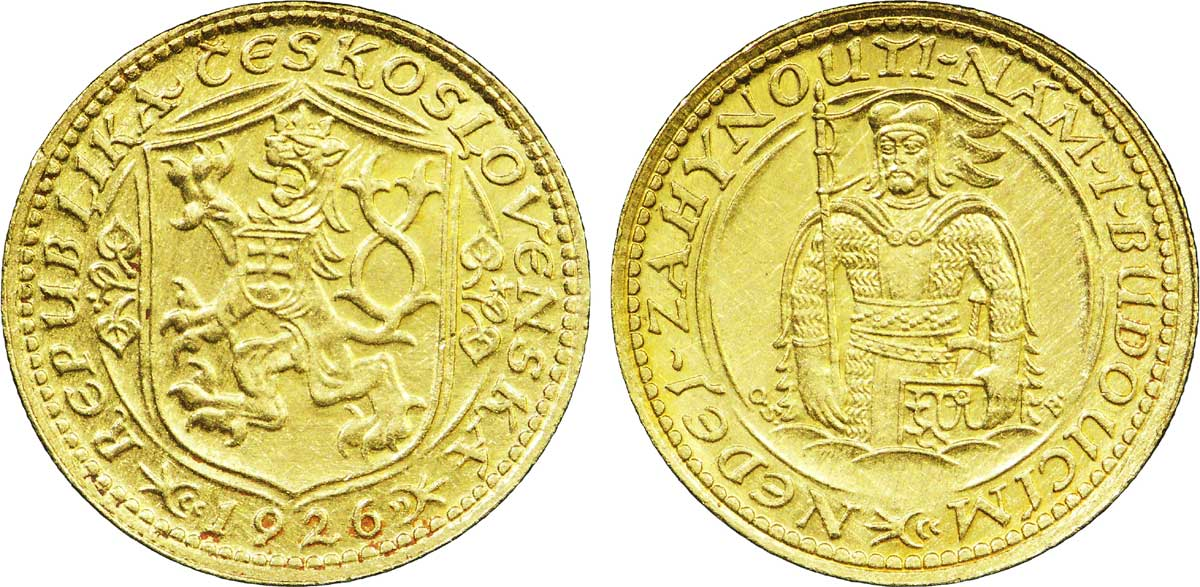
The Wenceslas Ducat

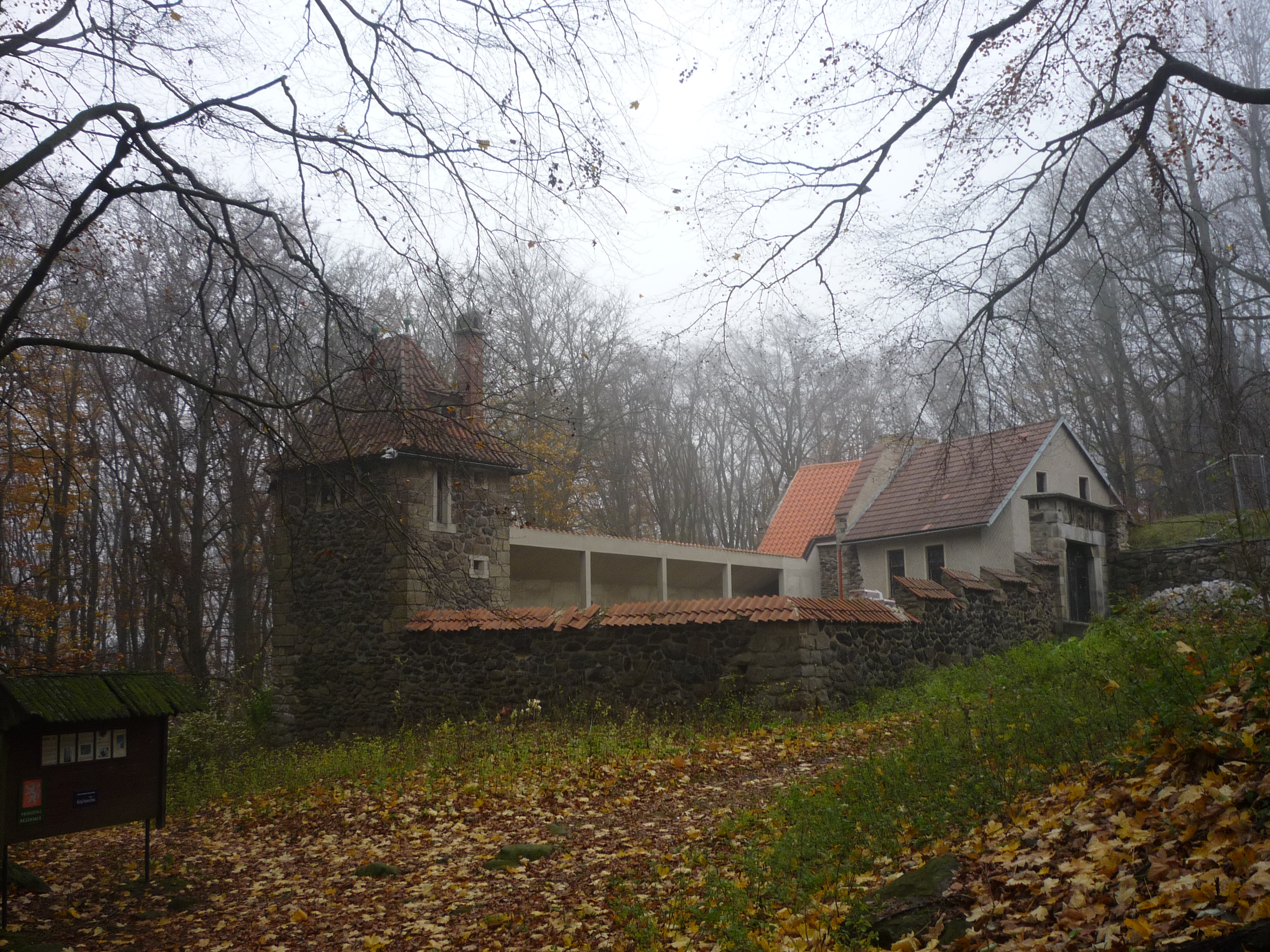
The Windmill house at Křemešník

He was born on 30 May 1878, in the village of Těšenov (part of Horní Cerekev) in the Kingdom of Bohemia, Austria-Hungary. After a local education, from around 1892 he studied ceramics at an art college in Bechyně before joining a ceramics factory at Rakovník.

In 1901, he returned to academia to study at the School of Applied Arts in Prague, studying under Stanislav Sucharda and Jan Preisler. From this stage his focus became small sculptures and commemorative medals.

He set up studio in Prague. His work included commissions from the Prague Mint and Paris Mint.

From 1924 to1926, he was editor of the "Dílo" art magazine.

He had a long-running project (1929 to 1939) on a hill of Křemešník where he intended to establish a coin museum and his main atelier in a romantic folly castle, designed and built by his architect friend Kamil Hilbert. He named the house "Windy castle" (Větrný zámek), but before the house was finished, Šejnost died of cancer.

Josef Šejnost died in Prague on 9 February 1941. Much of his medal work is highly collectible.

Originally buried in Prague, he was reinterred in the cemetery at Pelhřimov in the 21st century to be close to his home town. There is a museum in that town to his memory.

== Works ==
- Prague Town Hall: medallion heads to František Soukup, Alois Rašín, Antonín Švehla, Jiří Stříbrný and Vavro Šrobár (1918)
- The St. Wenceslas Ducat for the Prague Mint (1923)
- Commemorative medal to Olympic winner Bedřich Šupčík (1924)
- Gallery of Czech sport personalities to celebrate the centenary of Sokol (1929)
- Plaque to commemorate 1000 years since the foundation of Prague (1929)
- Gravestone of Joseph R. Mark (1930)
- Plaque at the birthplace of Bedřich Smetana in Litomyšl
- Plaque at the birthplace of Max Švabinský in Kroměříž
- Plaque of Jan Hus
- Plaque of Vojtěch Hynais
- Plaque of Karel Havlíček Borovský in Humpolec
- Bust of Pavol Orzsag-Hviezdoslav, National Museum in Prague
- Bear statues on approach to the castle at Nové Město nad Metují

== Publications ==
- The Problem of Progress in Sculpture (1924)

== Family ==
In 1918, aged 40, he married the writer and journalist, Marta Kalinová. They later lived in Prague and in Větrný Zámek.

They had two sons - Dimitrij and Zdeněk. Dimitrij became an accomplished aviation engineer. The younger son, Zdeněk Šejnost, studied at the Academy of Fine Arts in Prague (AVU) and became also a sculptor. He and his brother tried to continue the "Windmill House" project after his father's death despite the communistic regime in the country.

Josef Šejnost granddaughter Marta Anna later acquired the Windmill House and sold it in 2010 to an art collector, who is set to convert the house into a gallery and a guest house.
