= Věžná (Žďár nad Sázavou District) =

- Municipality
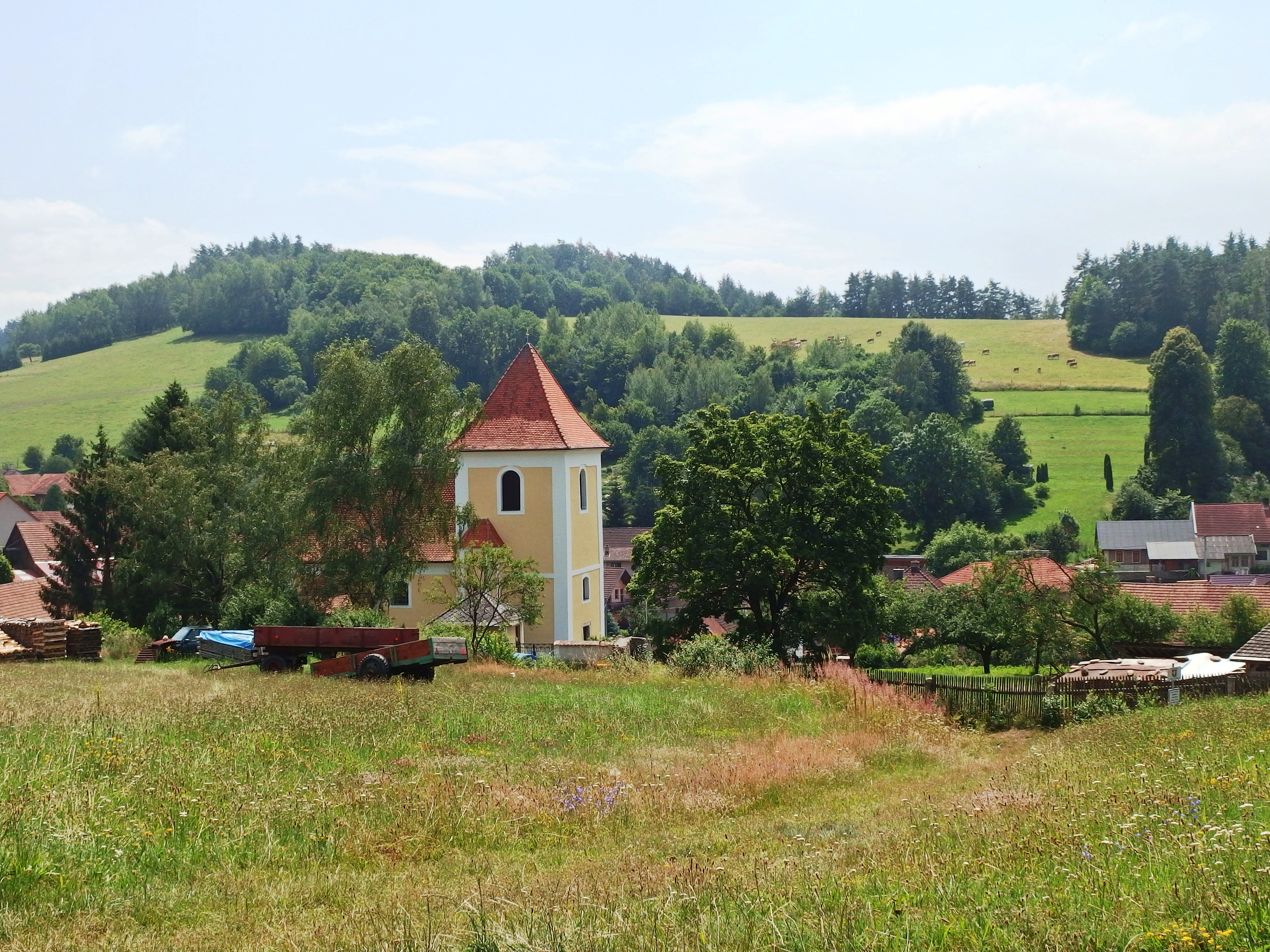
- View towards the Church of Saint Martin

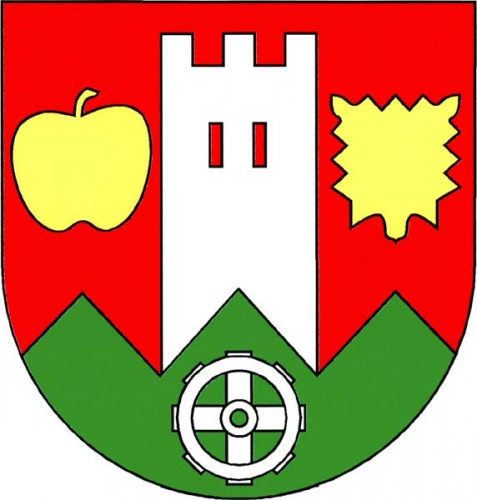
- Flag Coat of arms

- Location in the Czech Republic
- Coordinates: 49°27′39″N 16°16′16″E
- Country: Czech Republic
- Region: Vysočina
- District: Žďár nad Sázavou
- First mentioned: 1376

Area
  - Total: 8.66 km^{2} (3.34 sq mi)
- Elevation: 485 m (1,591 ft)

Population (2026-01-01)
  - Total: 239
  - Density: 27.6/km^{2} (71.5/sq mi)
- Time zone: UTC+1 (CET)
  - Summer (DST): UTC+2 (CEST)
- Postal code: 593 01
- Website: www.obecvezna.cz

Věžná is a municipality and village in Žďár nad Sázavou District in the Vysočina Region of the Czech Republic. It has about 200 inhabitants.

Věžná lies approximately 27 kilometres (17 mi) south-east of Žďár nad Sázavou, 50 km (31 mi) east of Jihlava, and 151 km (94 mi) south-east of Prague.

== Administrative division ==
Věžná consists of three municipal parts (in brackets population according to the 2021 census):

- Věžná (173)
- Jabloňov (41)
- Pernštejnské Janovice (30)

== Demographics ==
Historical population
Year	Pop.	±%
1869	528	—
1880	506	−4.2%
1890	491	−3.0%
1900	452	−7.9%
1910	451	−0.2%
1921	453	+0.4%
1930	440	−2.9%
1950	369	−16.1%
1961	371	+0.5%
1970	347	−6.5%
1980	292	−15.9%
1991	254	−13.0%
2001	206	−18.9%
2011	220	+6.8%
2021	244	+10.9%
Source: Censuses
