= Roman Havelka =

Czech painter (1877–1950)

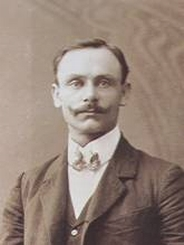
Roman Havelka (before 1920)

Roman Havelka (30 April 1877 – 20 June 1950) was a Czech landscape painter, in the Academic style.

== Life and work ==
He was born in Jemnice into the family of a poor net maker. When he was eight, they moved to Jihlava. For some time, he had displayed a talent for drawing. A German burgher there was among the first to take note, and offered him support. He was able to study at the Academy of Arts, Architecture and Design in Prague, with Stanislav Sucharda and Felix Jenewein. Later, during the school year of 1895/96, he transferred to the Academy of Fine Arts, where he studied with Julius Mařák and Antonín Slavíček. He graduated as a student of Rudolf Otto von Ottenfeld in 1900, then completed his studies in Dresden and Munich. Thanks to a scholarship, he was able to make study trips to Italy and Bosnia.

While still at school, he had become enchanted with the landscapes of Podyjí, to which he had been introduced by his elder colleague, František Bohumír Zvěřina. Many years later, he would do the same for Jan Jůzl. In 1900, he began exhibiting. He was awarded the Hlávek Travel Scholarship in 1902 and 1903. He also devoted himself to organizing the Association of Moravian Fine Artists, and served as its Chairman from 1923.

In 1914, he married Marta Měšťan, the daughter of a pharmacist. Not long after, he joined the army and was sent to fight on the Eastern Front. Marta gave birth to a daughter while he was away, and went to live with her parents in Třebíč. When he was discharged, in 1918, he set up a studio in Prague. They were not reunited until 1926, when he was able to buy a home.

Later he exhibited abroad, showing his works in Vienna, London, and Berlin. In addition to his paintings, he drew illustrations for several works; notably Castles and chateaux of the Czech Republic, by August Sedláček.

While visiting Znojmo, he died of pneumonia, aged 73. He completed over 3,000 paintings, which have been presented in 70 exhibitions. Streets have been named after him in Znojmo and Jihlava.

== Selected paintings ==
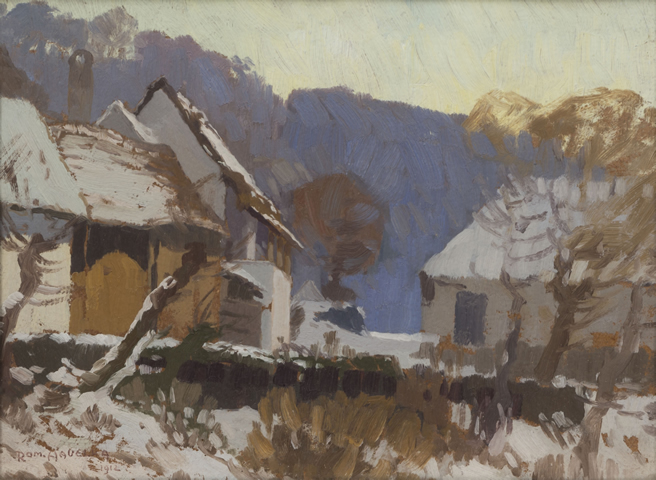
Between the Cottages

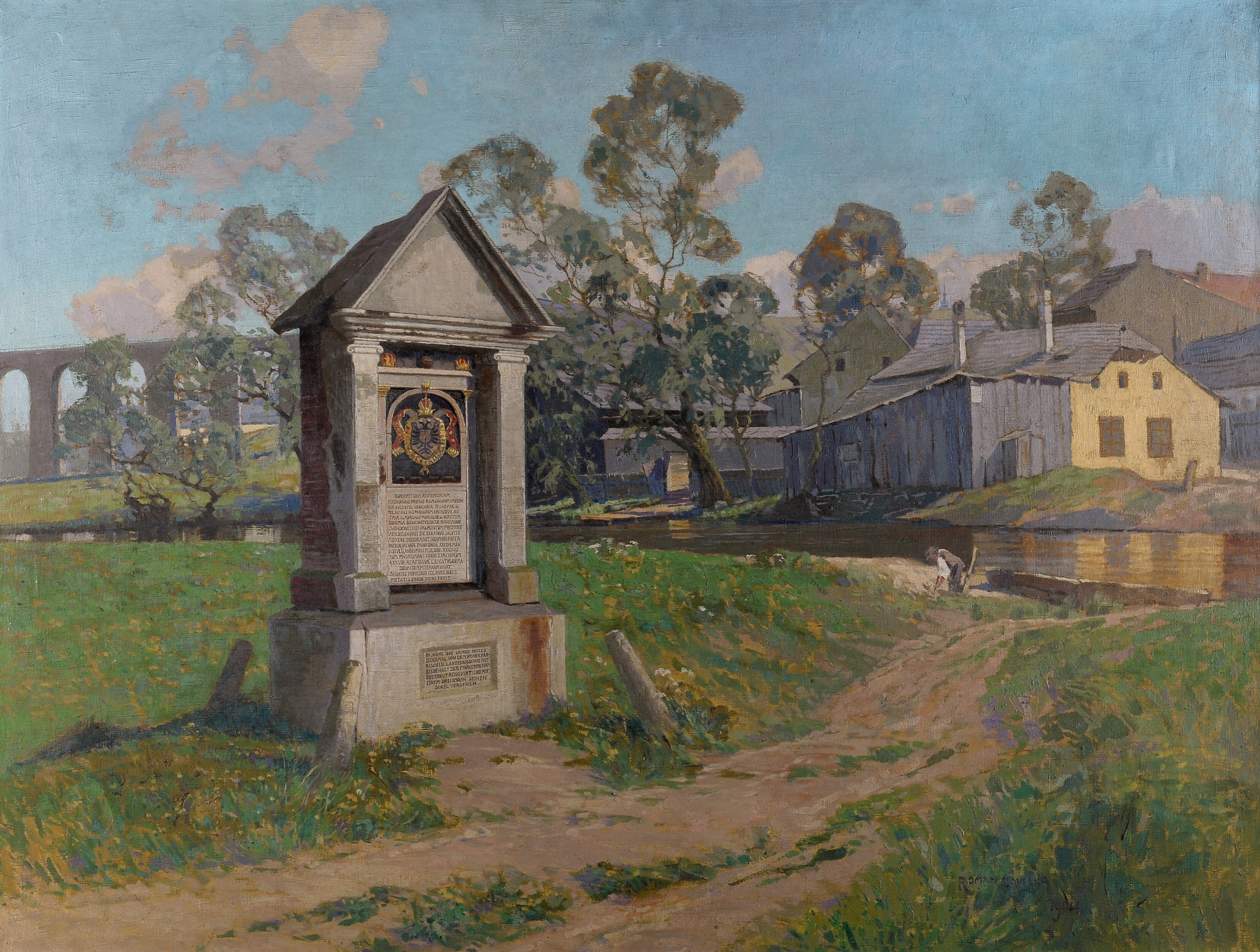
Landscape from Jihlava

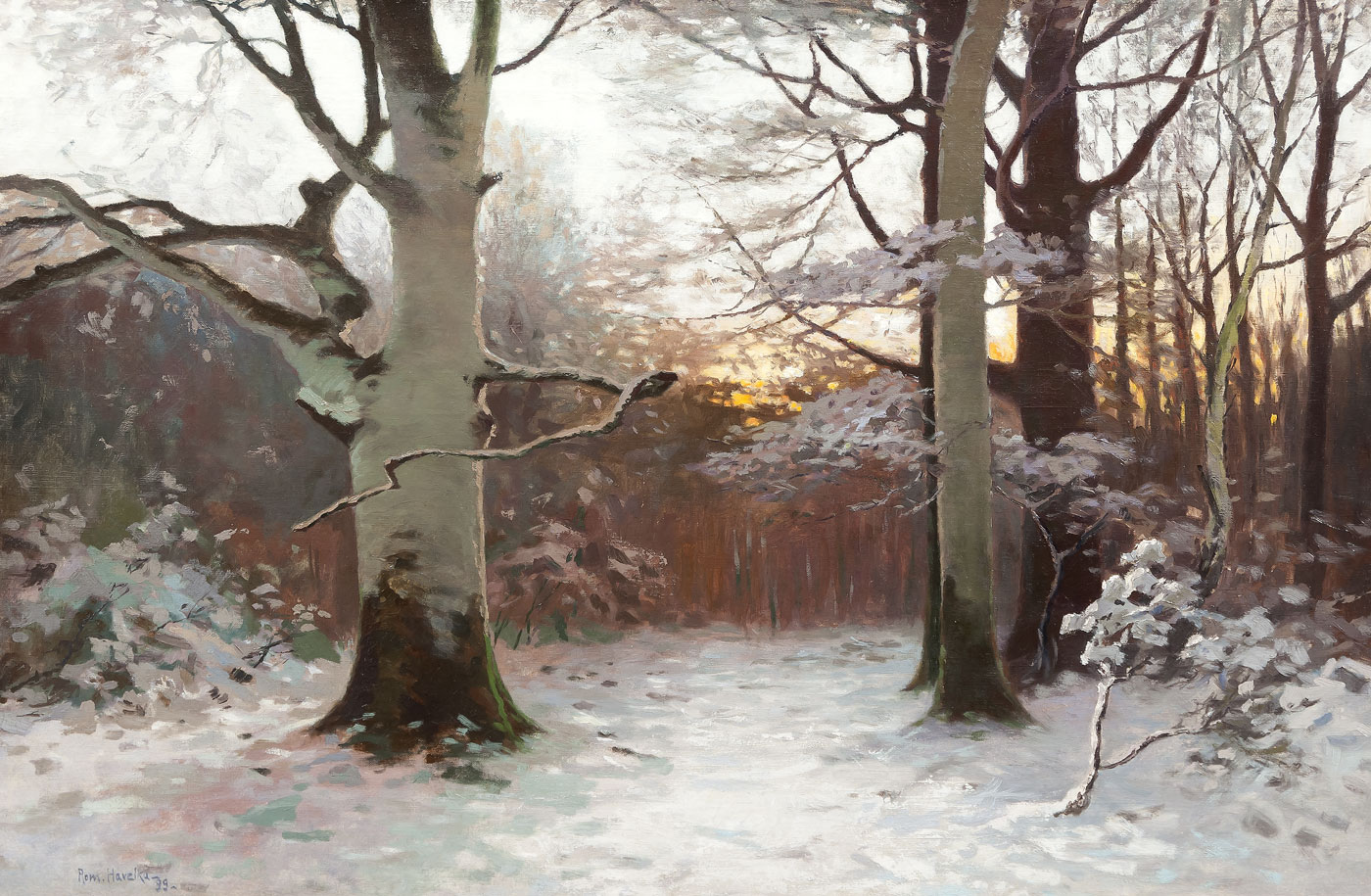
The Soul of the Beech Forest

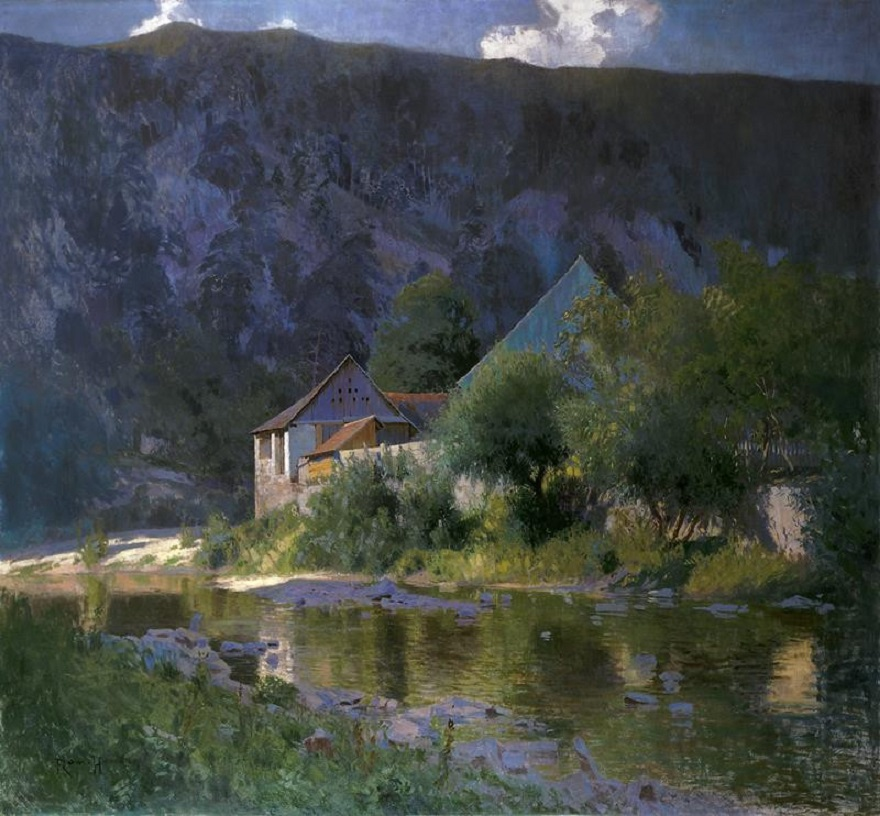
View from Bítov

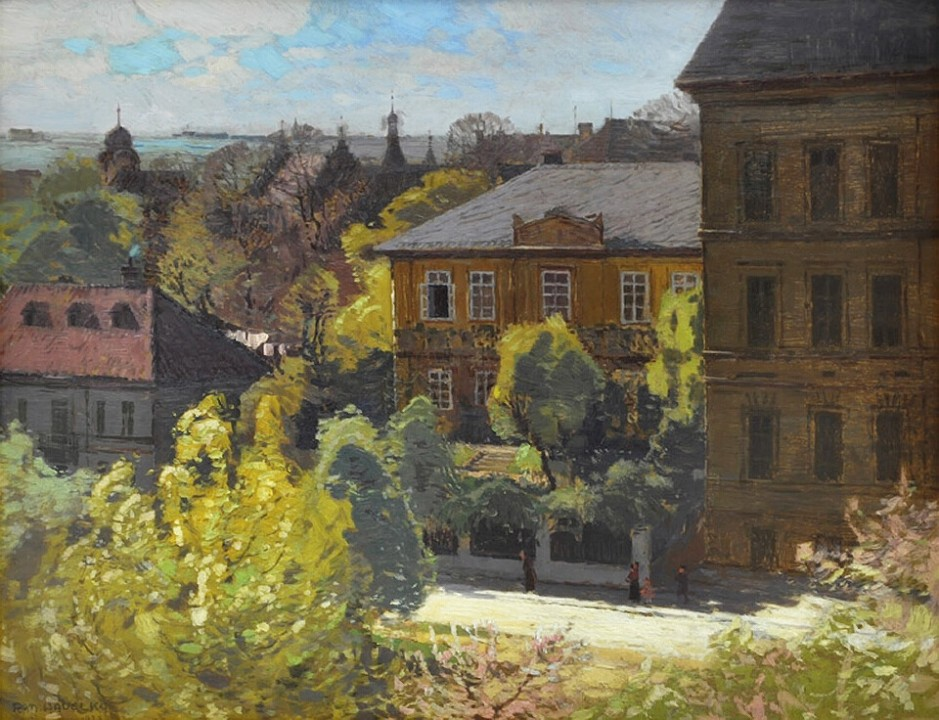
Bubeneč

== Sources ==
- Regionální osobnosti (Regional personalities), Okresní knihovna, Třebíč, 1995 ISBN 80-85062-01-1
- Jaroslav Pelikan: Roman Havelka: Krajinářská tvorba (Landscape Creations; exhibition catalog), Galerie výtvarného umění v Hodoníně, 1977
- Jitka Reissnerová: Roman Havelka: 1877 - 1950 (exhibition catalog), Oblastní galerie Vysočiny v Jihlavě, 2000
- Jiří Uhlíř: Roman Havelka malíř Podyjí (1877-1950), Muzeum Vysočiny Třebíč, 2004 ISBN 80-239-4338-3
