= Horní Cerekev =

- Town
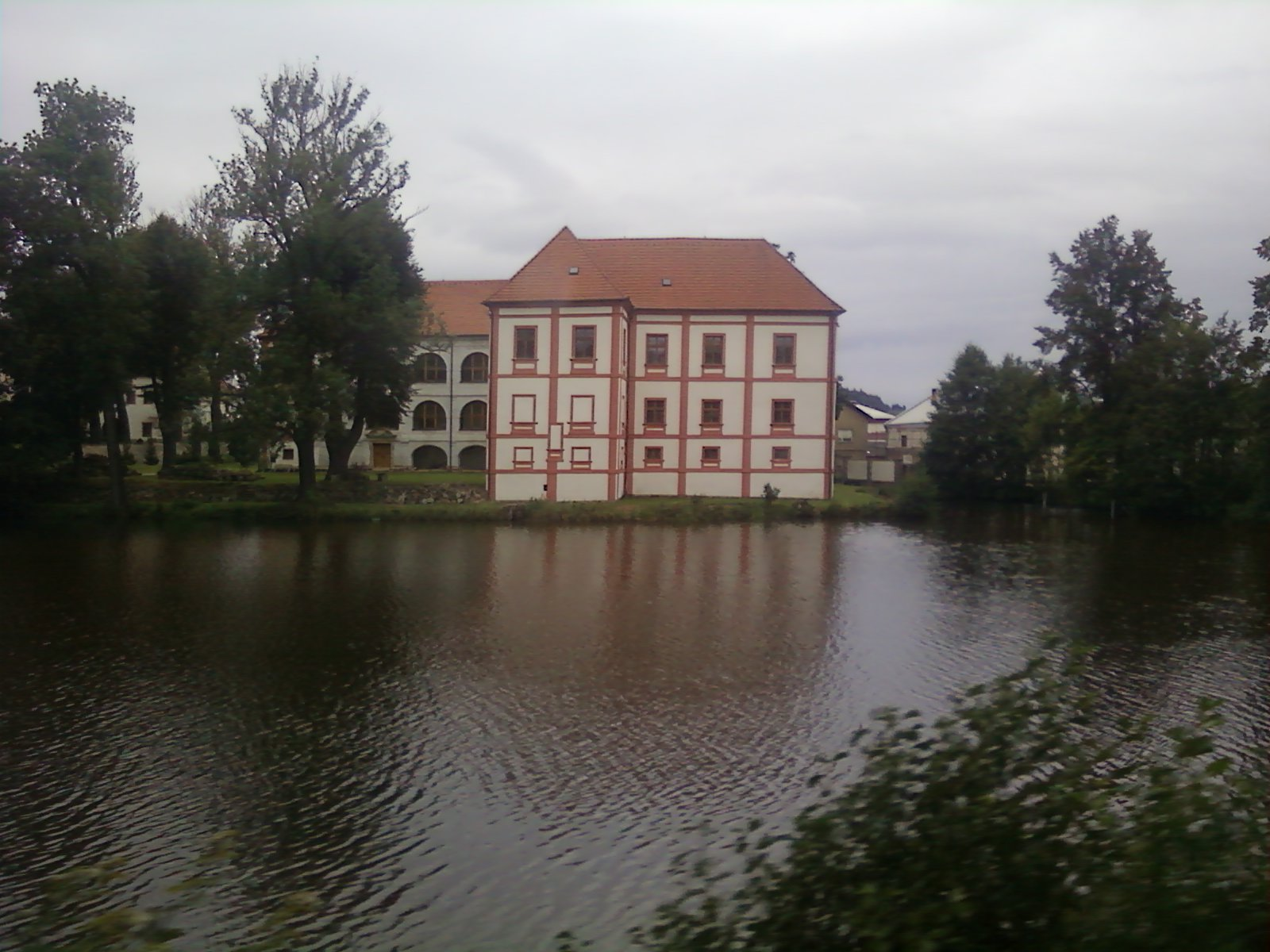
- Horní Cerekev Castle

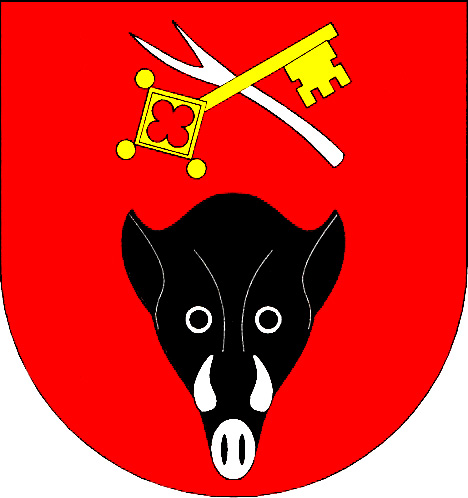
- Flag Coat of arms

- Location in the Czech Republic
- Coordinates: 49°19′13″N 15°19′40″E
- Country: Czech Republic
- Region: Vysočina
- District: Pelhřimov
- First mentioned: 1361

Government
  - Mayor: Milan Kunst

Area
  - Total: 31.98 km^{2} (12.35 sq mi)
- Elevation: 586 m (1,923 ft)

Population (2026-01-01)
  - Total: 1,872
  - Density: 58.54/km^{2} (151.6/sq mi)
- Time zone: UTC+1 (CET)
  - Summer (DST): UTC+2 (CEST)
- Postal code: 394 03
- Website: www.hornicerekev.cz

Horní Cerekev (Czech pronunciation: [ˈɦorɲiː tsɛrɛkɛf]; German: Ober Zerekwe) is a town in Pelhřimov District in the Vysočina Region of the Czech Republic. It has about 1,900 inhabitants. The town proper is located on the Jihlava River in the Křemešník Highlands.

Horní Cerekev was founded in the 14th century at the latest, but it became a town only in 2000.

== Administrative division ==
Horní Cerekev consists of five municipal parts (in brackets population according to the 2021 census):

- Horní Cerekev (1,316)
- Chrástov (61)
- Hříběcí (241)
- Těšenov (93)
- Turovka (20)

== Etymology ==
The settlement was initially named Líčkovice after its founder Líček and later renamed Cierkev, i.e. 'church' in old Czech. Later the name evolved into Cerekev and the prefix Horní ('upper') was added.

== Geography ==
Horní Cerekev is located about 14 kilometres (9 mi) southeast of Pelhřimov and 19 km (12 mi) southwest of Jihlava. The Jihlava River flows through the town. The municipal territory lies mostly in the Křemešník Highlands, only the area on the left bank of the Jihlava River extends into the Křižanov Highlands. The highest point is at 713 m (2,339 ft) above sea level.

== History ==
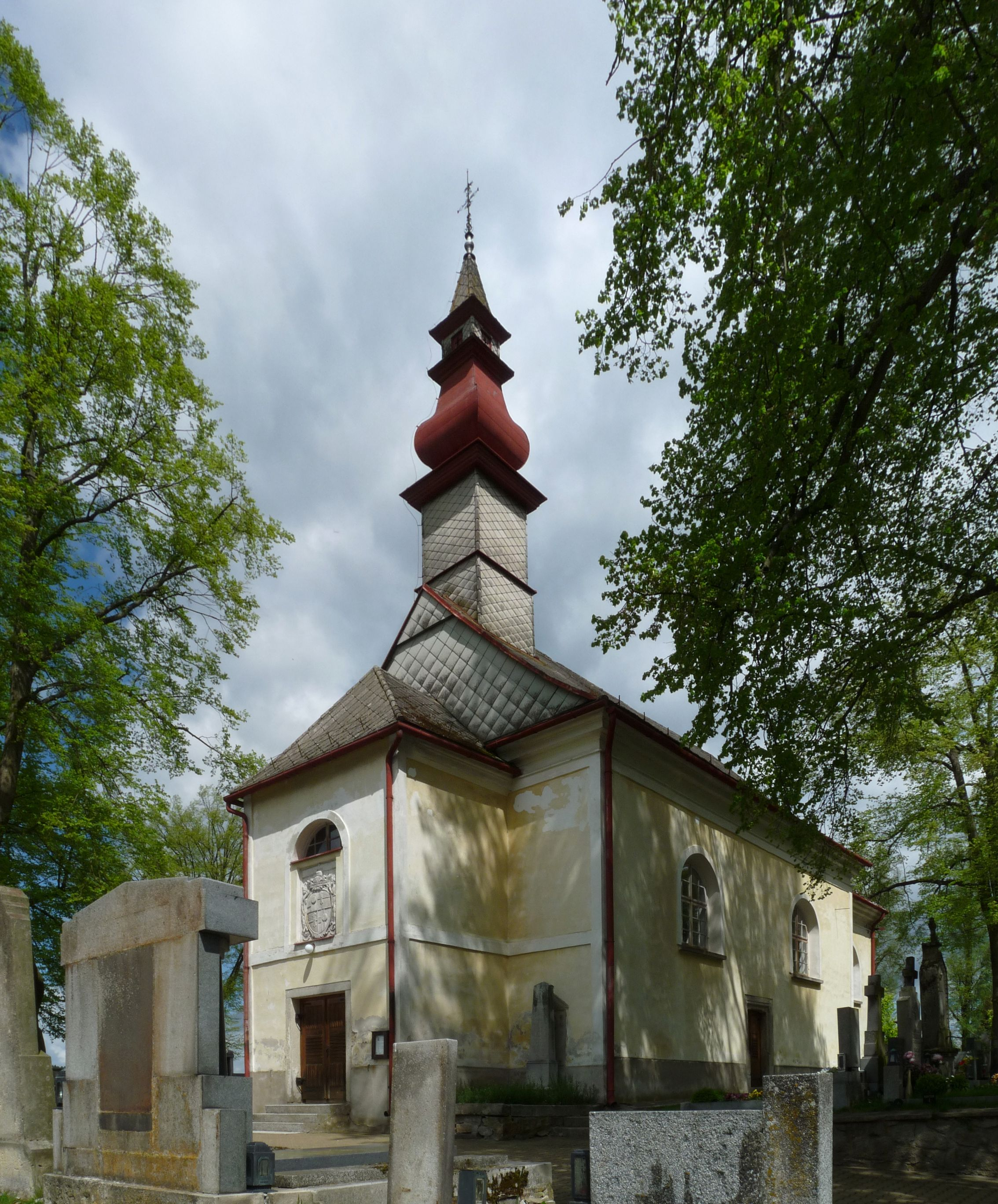
Church of Saint John the Baptist

The first written mention of Horní Cerekev is from 1361. The most notable owners of the village was the Léskovec family, which ruled it from 1411 to 1655. The last noble owners, who held Horní Cerekev until 1945, were the Hohenzollern family.

In 2000, the municipality was promoted to a town.

== Demographics ==
Historical population

Year	Pop.	±%
1869	2,716	—
1880	2,745	+1.1%
1890	2,798	+1.9%
1900	2,789	−0.3%
1910	2,694	−3.4%

Year	Pop.	±%
1921	2,704	+0.4%
1930	2,652	−1.9%
1950	2,246	−15.3%
1961	2,253	+0.3%
1970	2,102	−6.7%

Year	Pop.	±%
1980	1,961	−6.7%
1991	1,877	−4.3%
2001	1,845	−1.7%
2011	1,820	−1.4%
2021	1,731	−4.9%

Source: Censuses

== Transport ==
Horní Cerekev is located on the railway lines Brno–Plzeň and Jihlava–Tábor.

== Sights ==
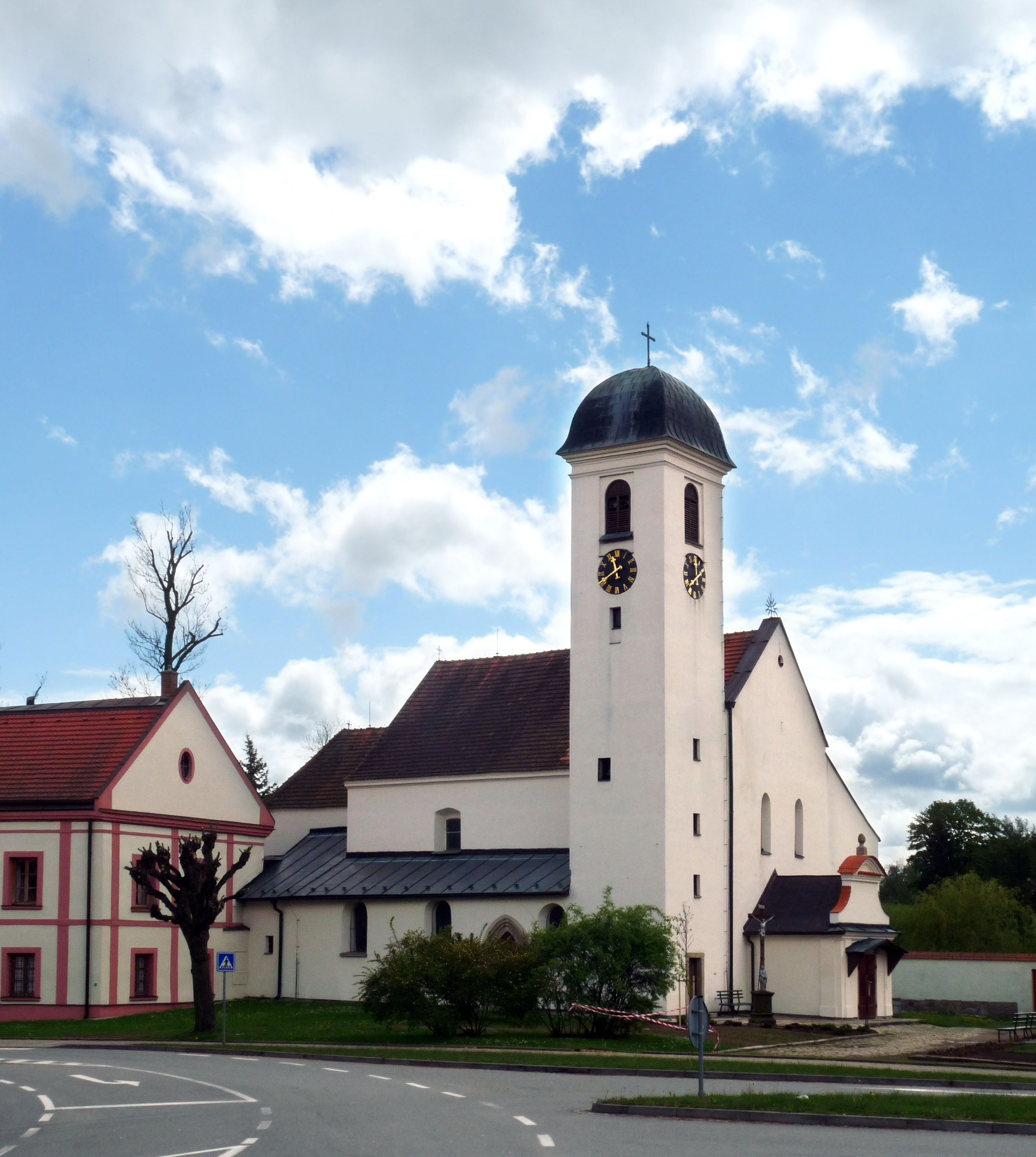
Church of the Annunciation

The Church of the Annunciation dates from 1384. The original wooden church gave the town its name and was later replaced by a stone one. It was extended and remodelled in the Baroque style in 1631 and 1763. After a fire in 1821, only one of its two towers was reconstructed.

A small fortress surrounded by moats was built in the 14th century. Between 1411 and 1655, it was gradually rebuilt in the Renaissance style. In 1720 and 1734, it was rebuilt into its current Baroque form.

== Notable people ==
- Josef Šejnost (1878–1941), sculptor
- Josef Dvořák (born 1942), actor
- Denisa Křížová (born 1994), ice hockey player
