= Křemešník Highlands =

Region of the Czech Republic

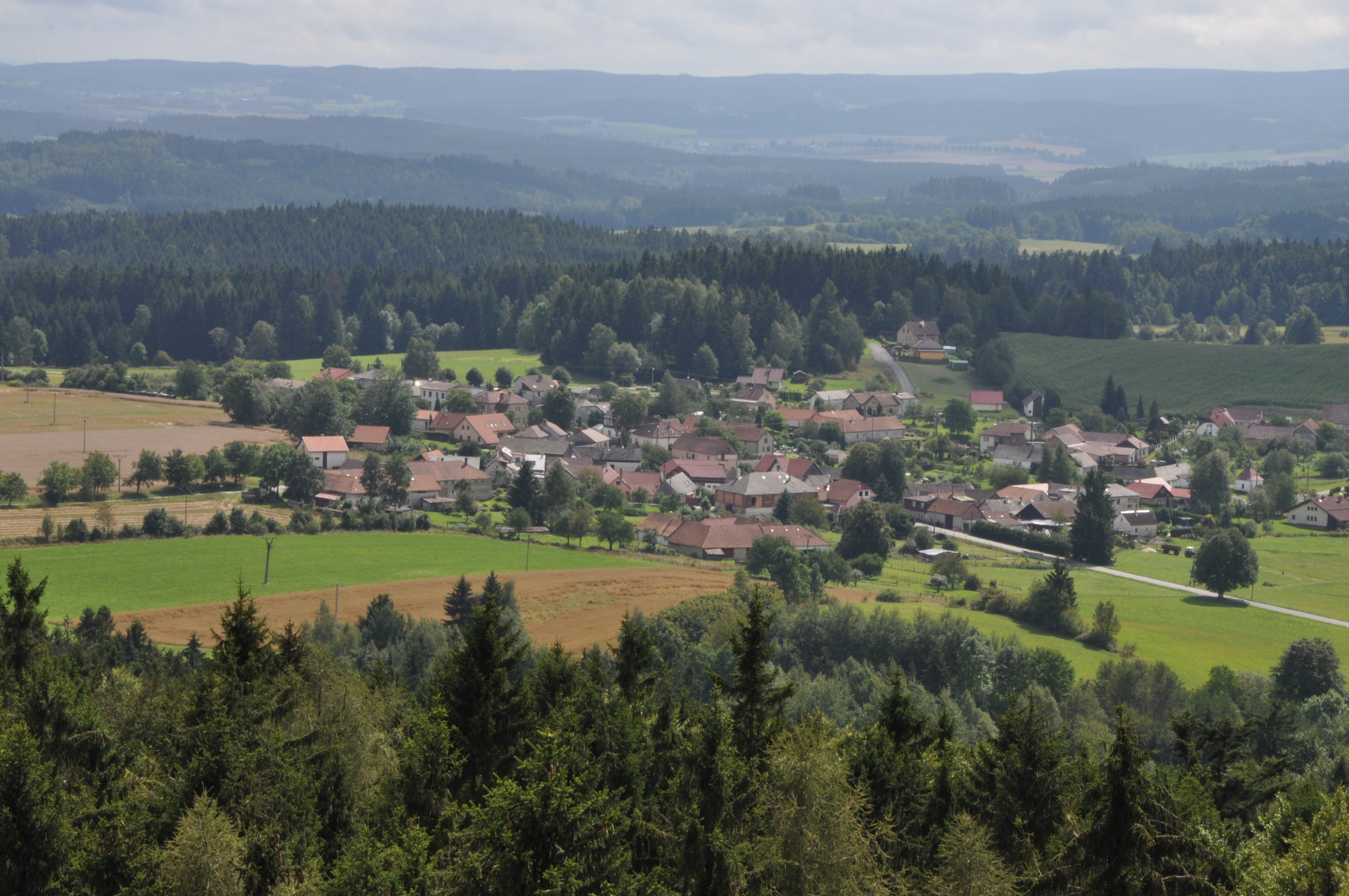
- View from Křemešník to the south

Highest point
- Peak: Křemešník
- Elevation: 765 m (2,510 ft)

Dimensions
- Length: 70 km (43 mi)
- Area: 2,634 km^{2} (1,017 mi^{2})

Geography
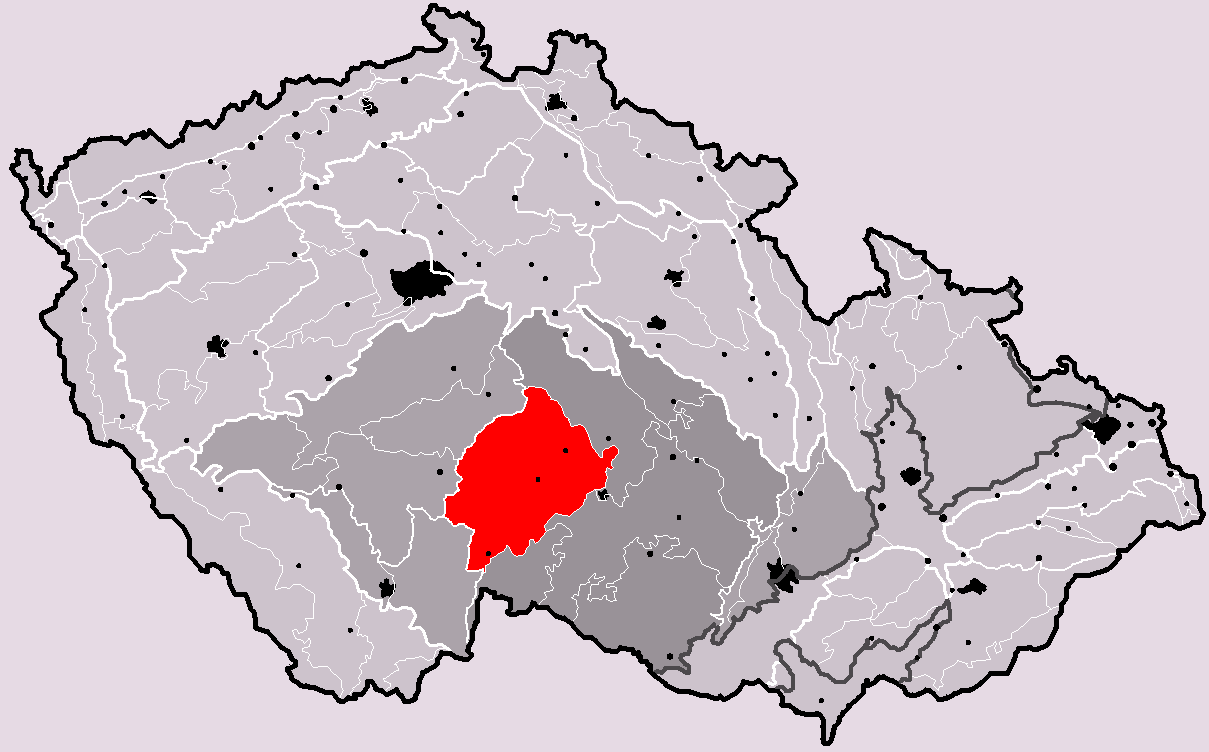
- Křemešník Highlands in the geomorphological system of the Czech Republic
- Country: Czech Republic
- Regions: Vysočina; South Bohemian; Central Bohemian
- Range coordinates: 49°25′N 15°7′E
- Parent range: Bohemian-Moravian Highlands

Geology
- Rock type(s): Gneiss, granite, sediments

The Křemešník Highlands (Czech: Křemešnická vrchovina) are highlands and a geomorphological mesoregion of the Czech Republic. It is located mainly in the Vysočina Region, but it also extends into the South Bohemian and Central Bohemian regions. With an area of 2,634 km^{2} (1,017 sq mi), it is the third largest mesoregion in the country.

== Geomorphology ==
The Křemešník Highlands is a mesoregion of the Bohemian-Moravian Highlands within the Bohemian Massif. Mild and rather elongated ridges predominate. The relief is monotonous, disturbed only by deep valleys of watercourses. The highlands are further subdivided into the microregions of Jindřichův Hradec Uplands, Pacov Uplands, Želiv Uplands and Humpolec Highlands.

There are a lot of medium-high hills. The highest peaks of the Křemešník Highlands are:

- Křemešník, 769 m (2,523 ft)
- Čeřínek, 762 m (2,500 ft)
- Lísek, 760 m (2,490 ft)
- Mešnice, 756 m (2,480 ft)
- Špeták, 748 m (2,454 ft)
- Stražiště, 745 m (2,444 ft)
- Březina, 744 m (2,441 ft)
- Spálený vrch, 741 m (2,431 ft)
- Svidník, 740 m (2,430 ft)
- Batkovy, 724 m (2,375 ft)

== Geography ==
The Křemešník Highlands has a relatively regular shape of the territory, slightly elongated from the southwest to the northeast. It has an area of 2,634 km^{2} (1,017 sq mi) and an average elevation of 552 metres (1,811 ft). It is the third largest mesoregion in the Czech Republic.

The area is rich in watercourses, but there are not many notable rivers. The most significant river is the Sázava, which flows through the northernmost part of the area. The northern part of the area is drained by the Želivka, a tributary of the Sázava. The Švihov Reservoir is built on the Želivka and is the largest body of water in the Křemešník Highlands. The southern part of the highlands is drained by the Nežárka. In addition to the Želivka and Nežárka, other notable rivers that originate in the territory are the Jihlava and Blanice.

The most populous towns in the territory are Jindřichův Hradec, Pelhřimov, Humpolec, Ledeč nad Sázavou, Pacov, Kamenice nad Lipou and Žirovnice.

== Geology ==
The geological bedrock mainly consists of the metamorphic rocks – gneiss and granite. The composition is supplemented with amphibolite, limestone and granulite. In the south, the geological composition blends with the neighbouring Třeboň Basin, and there are occasionally also clays, sands and gravels.

== Nature ==
A large part of the area is agricultural. Apart from the edge of the Třeboňsko Protected Landscape Area, there are no significant protected areas in the territory.

== Gallery ==
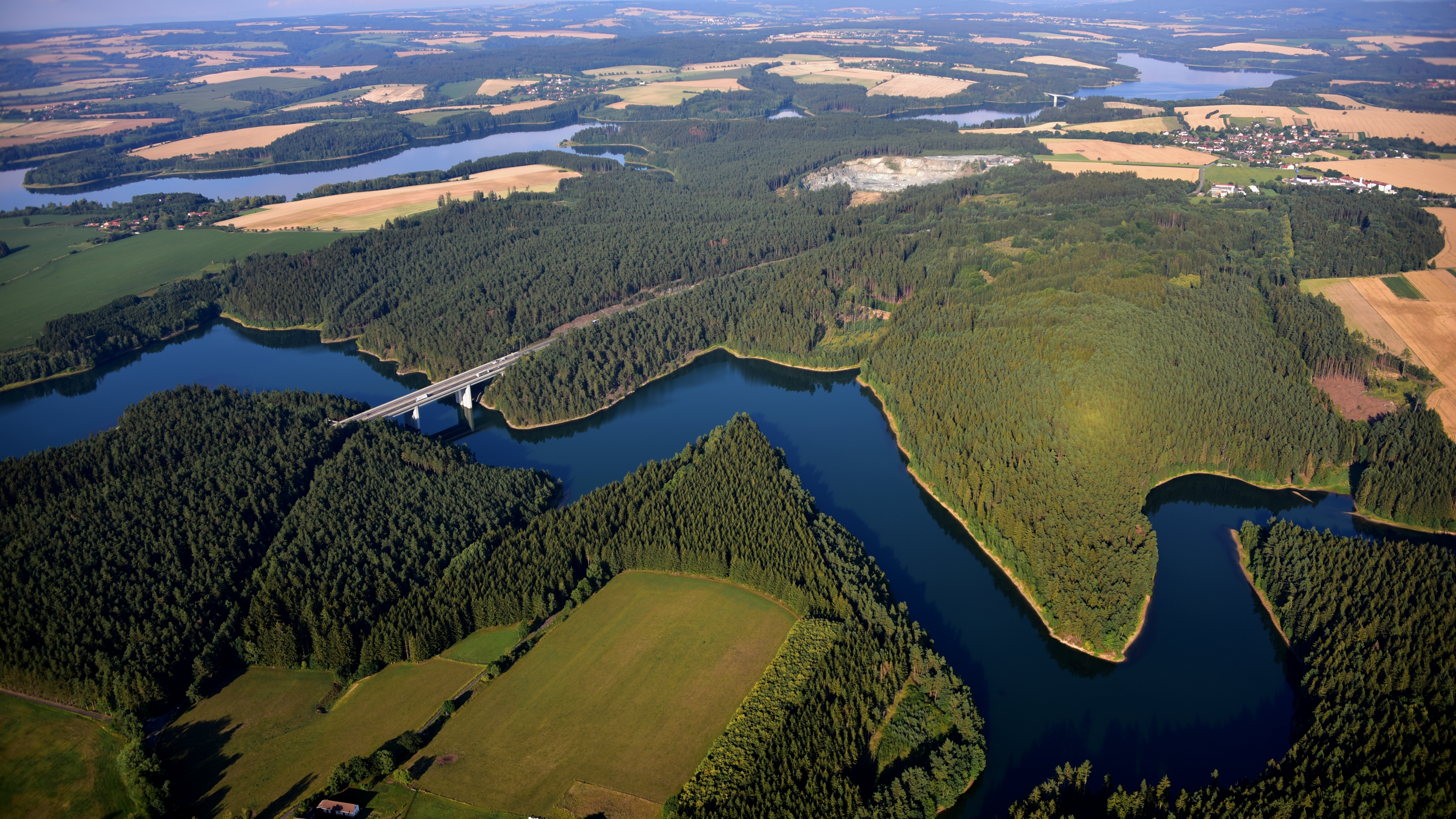
Švihov Reservoir

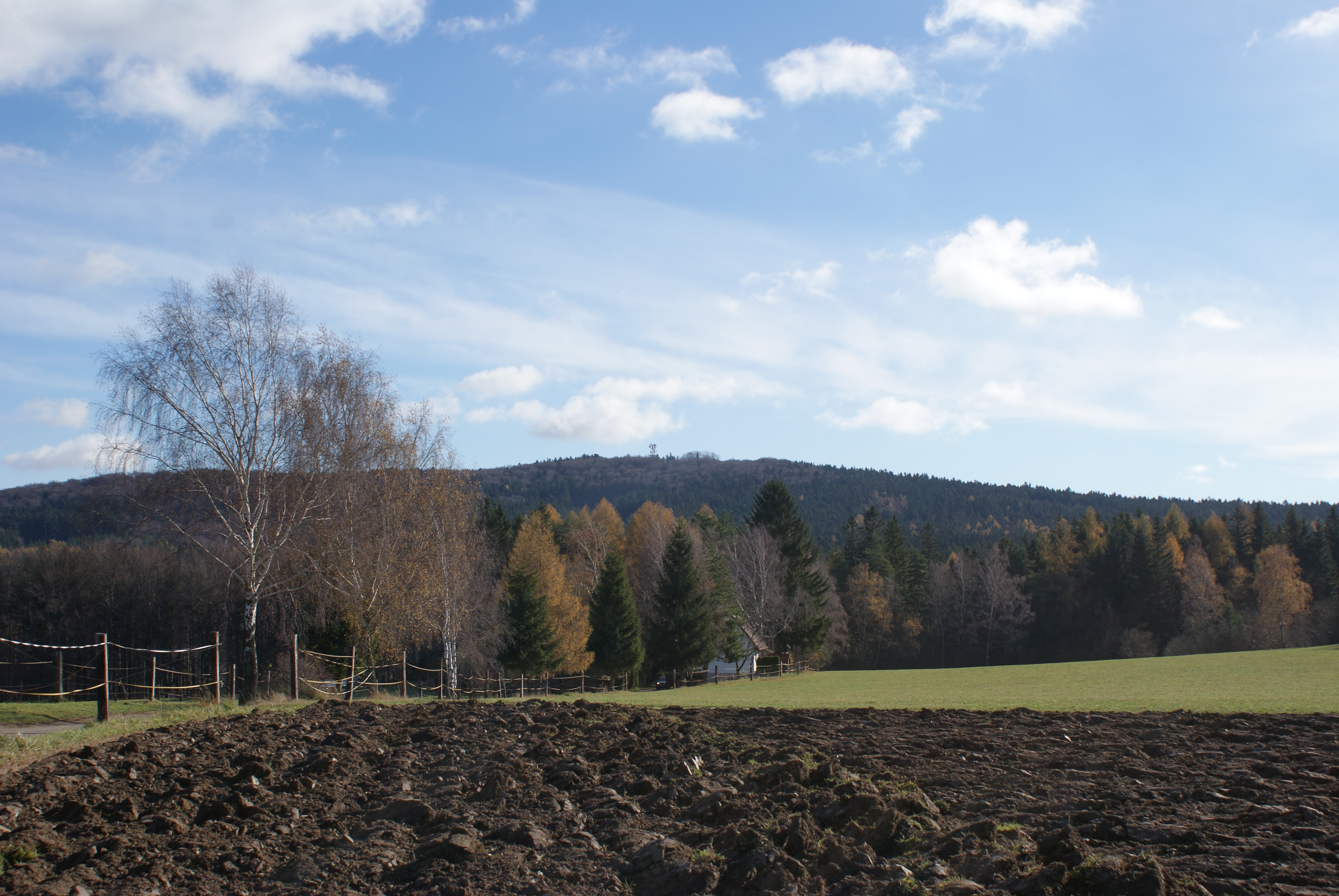
Mt. Křemešník

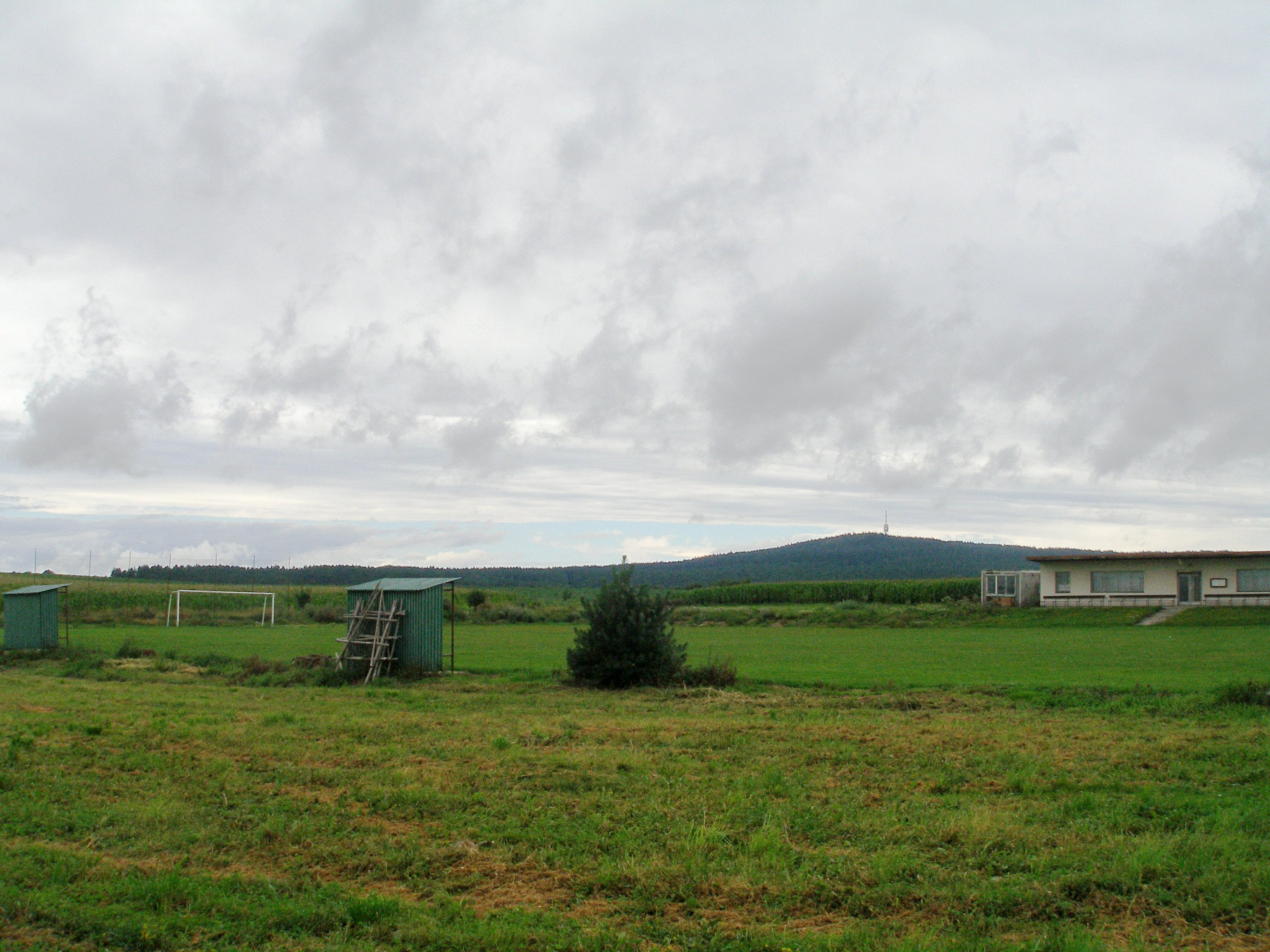
View towards Stražiště

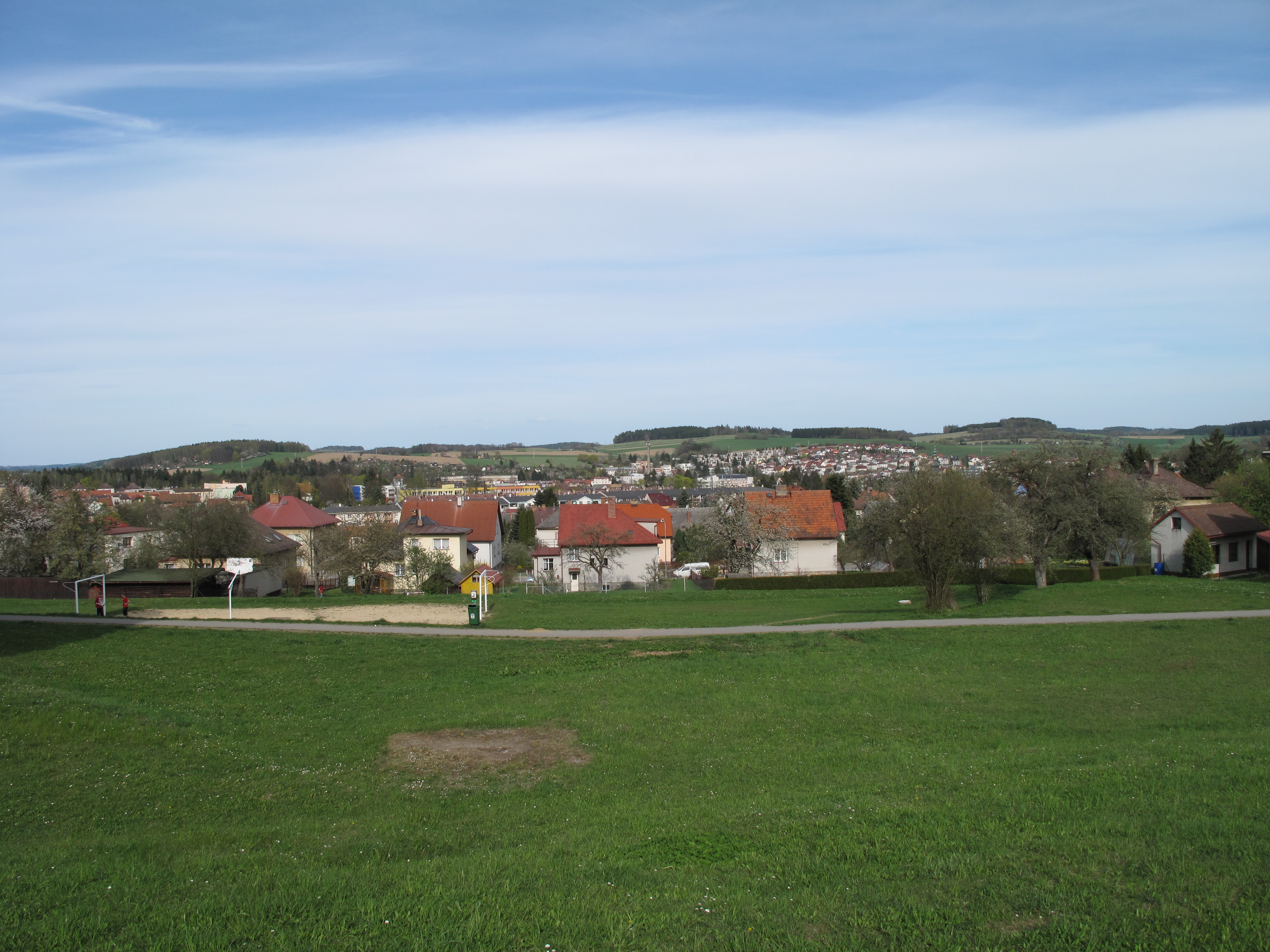
Town of Pelhřimov
