= Mrákotín =

Mrákotín may refer to places in the Czech Republic:

- Mrákotín (Chrudim District), a municipality and village in the Pardubice Region
- Mrákotín (Jihlava District), a market town in the Vysočina Region
