= Suchý vrch =

Mountain in Pardubice Region, Czech Republic

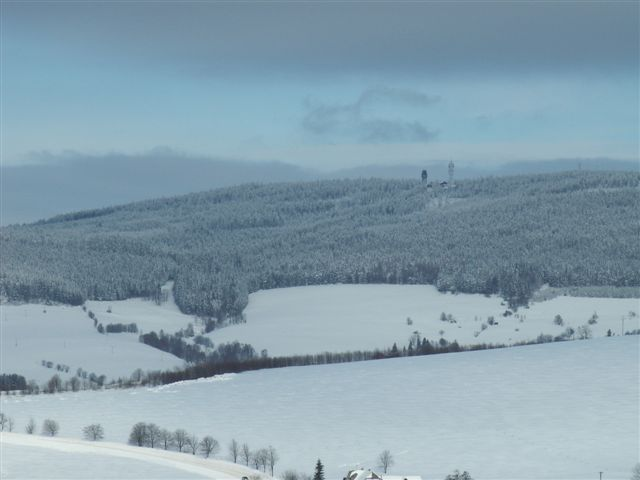
- Winter view of Suchý vrch

Highest point
- Elevation: 995 m (3,264 ft)
- Prominence: 435 m (1,427 ft)
- Isolation: 8.5 km (5.3 mi)
- Coordinates: 50°3′2″N 16°41′38″E

Geography
- Location within Czech Republic
- Location: Orličky, Czech Republic
- Parent range: Orlické Mountains

Suchý vrch (German: Dürrer Berg; Polish: Suchy szczyt; 995 metres) is the highest (double-peaked) mountain of the southern part of the Orlické Mountains in the Czech Republic. Located on the historical border between Bohemia and Moravia, and right on trace where runs line of drainage divide of main European watershed (Elbe – North Sea and Danube basin – Black Sea).

A radio re-transmitter is situated on the top. The upper platform is used as a watchtower. The mountain is also a popular area for skiing.

== History ==
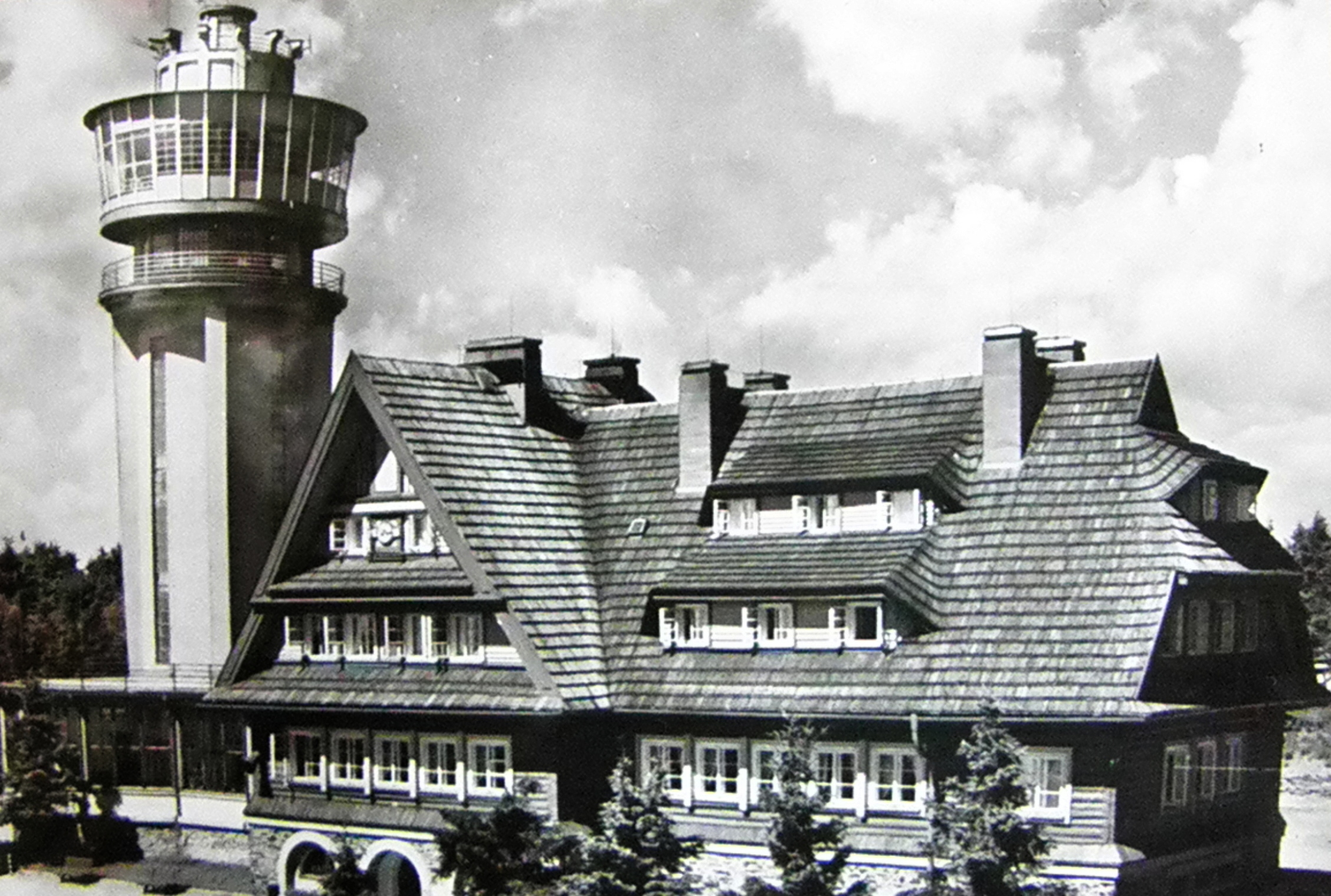
Original hotel (1928) and B tower, earlier than burnt out

.

The first construction on the mountain was a simple cabin in 1925, as refuge for mountain hikers. In 1928, a mountain hotel was built after the design of architect Jaroslav Stejskal. It was called Kramářova chata (Karel Kramář mountain hut) and had a concrete watchtower 28 metres high.

After World War I, the rising nationalism within both the Sudeten German Tourist Association and its Czech-speaking rival, Klub českých turistů (Czech hikers club) prompted each group to attempt to outdo one another at each mountain peak, with facilities that accommodated hiker lodgings and watchtowers. This activity seemed to identify the Germans as pioneers of mountain tourism and the Czechs good learners.

On 26 August 1937 he lunched where President Edvard Beneš as inspector supreme for the control of border defense fortification, against the aggression of Hitler.

The Bradlo (Klippe) is a slate stone formation in the Orlické hory mountain range of the Czech Republic, near the higher peak. In the Middle Ages, people feared the place, believing witches lived there. The area is home to many rare plants, so it is not open to the public.

== Geology ==
The entire massif consists mainly of moldanubic, i.e. series of rocks generated during sedimentation in Precambrian sea and wrinkled later into mountain chains and composed of crystalline slates and schicht gneiss (a metamorphic rock with foliations), mica schicht and quartzite. Rocks in the syntectonic migmatite of the Orlické mountains create Suchý vrch shortly before the Precambrian period.

The summit is round and smooth, with jagged edge naked vertical rocks (Bradlo) no more than 12 m (39 ft) in height.

== Flora ==
Summit is covered by alpine meadow, and all hill sides forested by spruce forest. Plants: False lily, fern bracken, western oakfern, and lot of bilberryes.

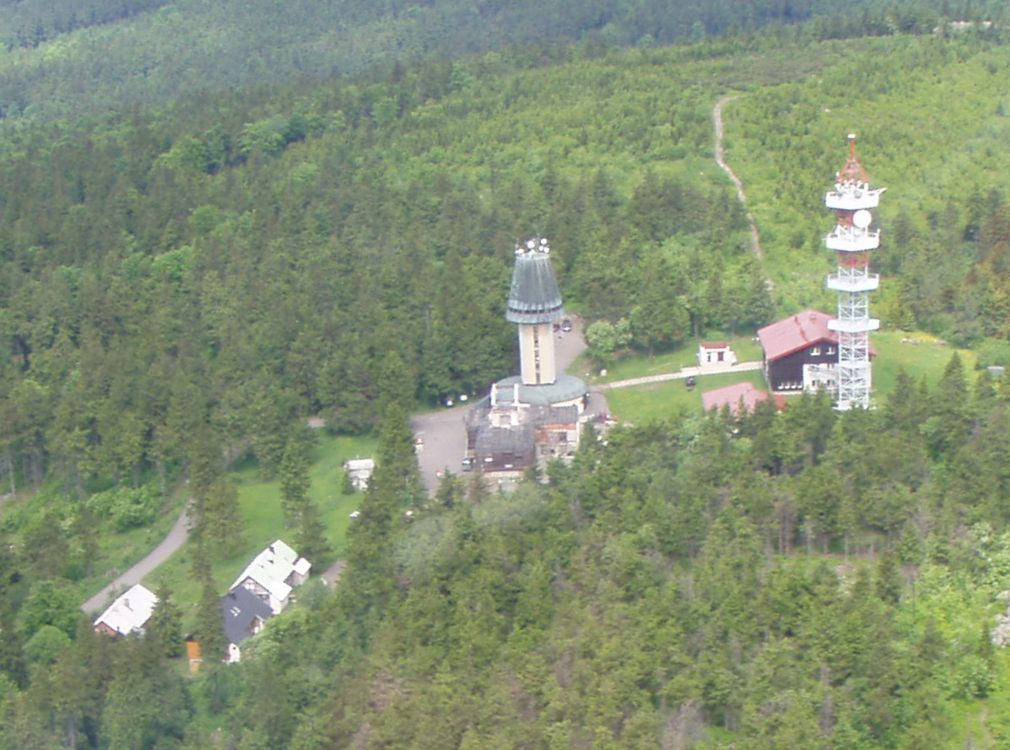
Summit of Suchý vrch from air

== Climate ==
The average annual temperature is about 2,5 °C.

== Watchtower ==
The observation tower and later re-transmitter was built in 1931–1932 by design of architect A. Patrmann. The Giant Mountains, Malá Fatra and Alps can be seen from the observation tower platform.
