= Geomorphological division of the Czech Republic =

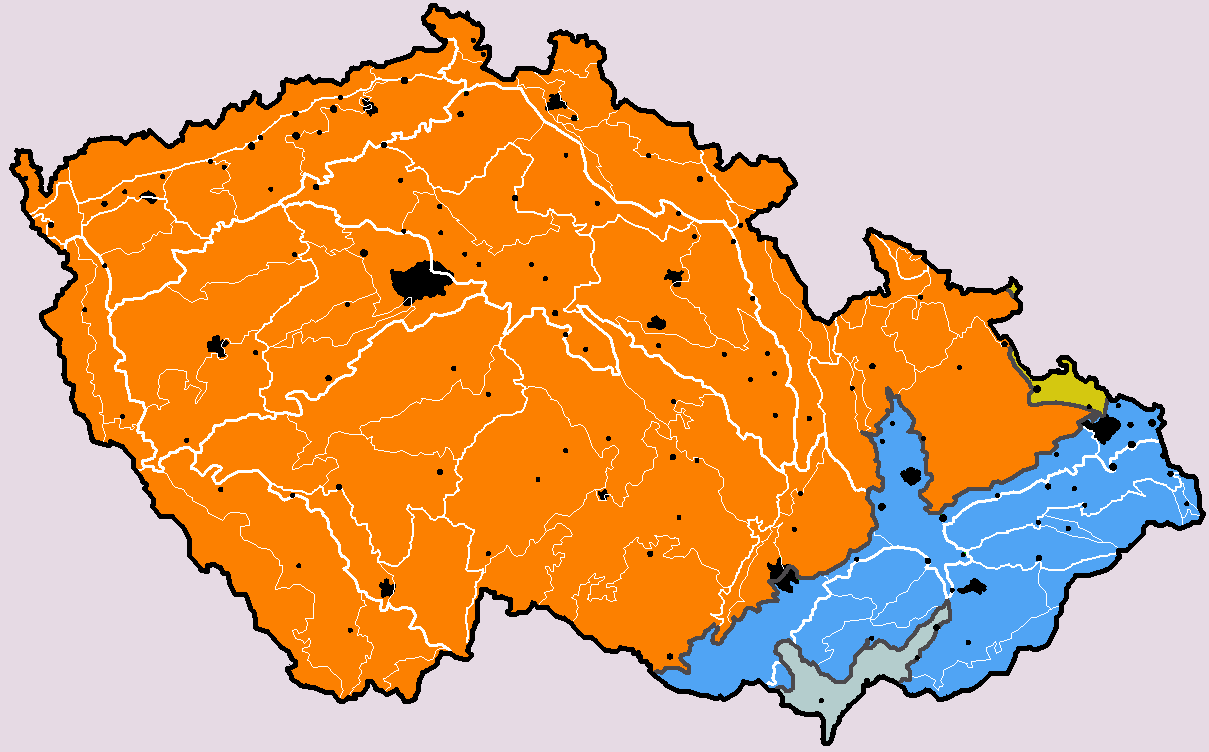
Geomorphological provinces of the Czech Republic Bohemian Massif North European Plain Western Carpathians Western Pannonian Basin

In terms of geomorphological division, the Czech Republic is a very diverse territory, located in the territory of four geomorphological provinces within four geomorphological subsystems. The Bohemian Massif, part of the Hercynian Forest system, covers most of the country, while its southeastern and eastern regions belong to the Western Carpathians within the Carpathian Mountains. The remaining two provinces, Western Pannonian Plain within the Pannonian Basin and North European Plain within the European Plain, cover only a small part of the Czech territory in the southeast and northeast.

The provinces are further subdivided into subprovinces, macroregions, mesoregions, microregions and areas. The generally accepted division of the relief of the Czech Republic into subprovinces, macroregions and mesoregions is given below.

== Maps ==
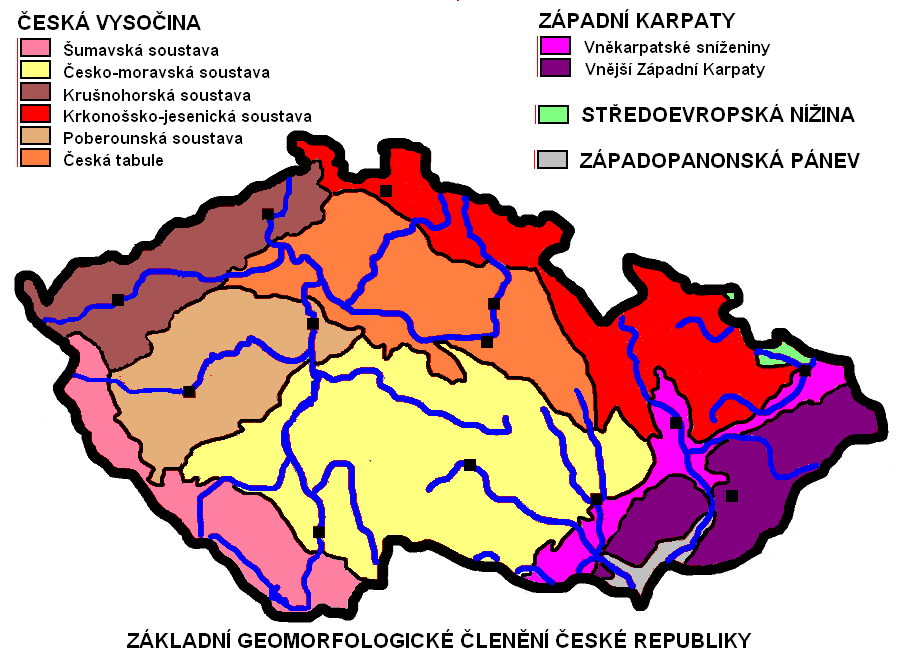
Subprovinces of the Czech Republic

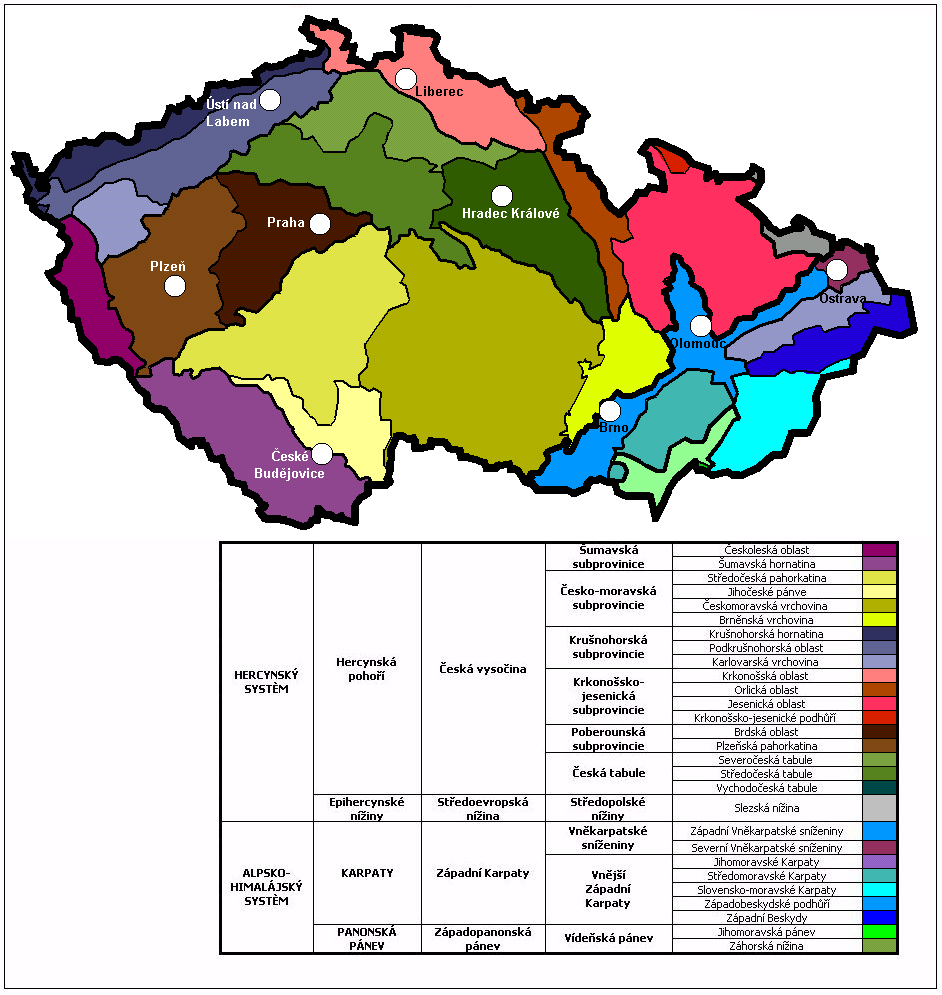
Macroregions of the Czech Republic

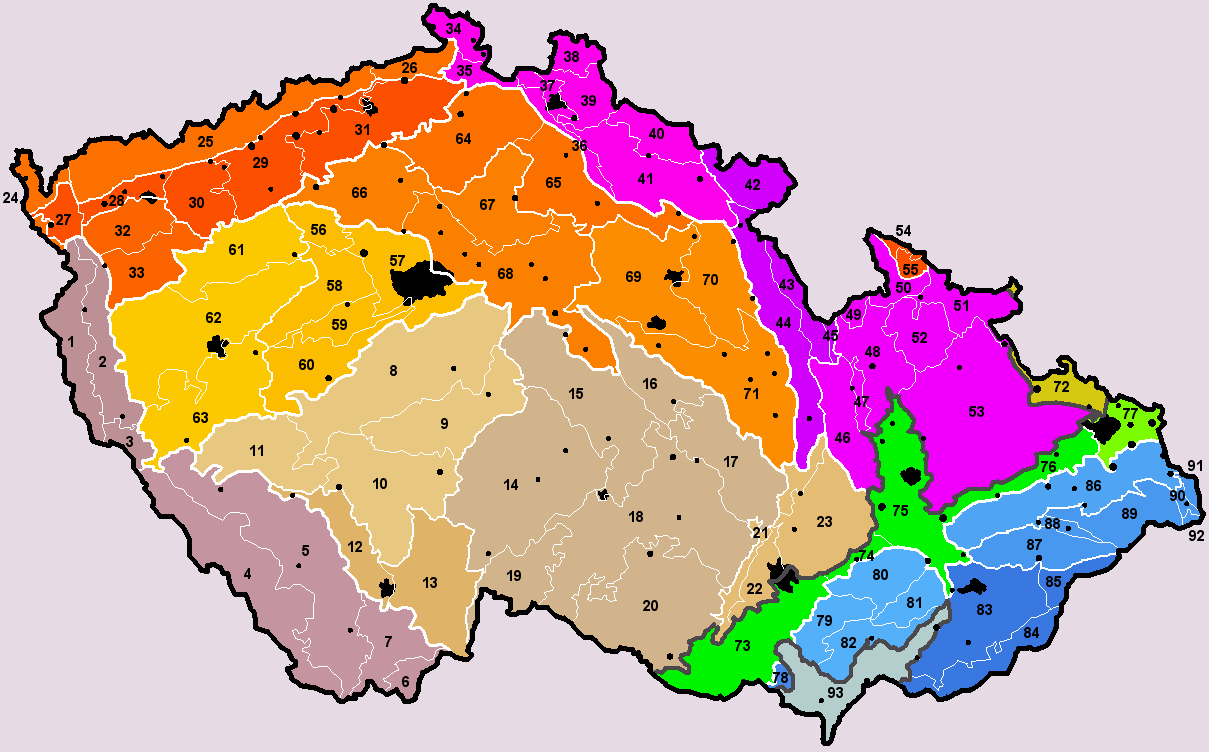
Mesoregions of the Czech Republic (Note: The numbering on the map corresponds to the numbering in the list below.)

== Basic geomorphological division ==
Note: Some mesoregions extend beyond the borders of the Czech Republic. The area, average altitude and highest point correspond to the territory of mesoregions only in the Czech Republic.

Province	Subprovince	Macroregion	Mesoregion	Code	Area (km^{2})	Average altitude (m ASL)	Highest point (m ASL)
Bohemian Massif	Bohemian Forest Subprovince	Upper Palatine Forest Macroregion	Upper Palatine Forest (Český les)	IA-1	789	628.2	1042 (Čerchov)
Bohemian Massif	Bohemian Forest Subprovince	Upper Palatine Forest Macroregion	Podčeskoleská Hills (Podčeskoleská pahorkatina)	IA-2	746	491.1	679 (Chebský vršek)
Bohemian Massif	Bohemian Forest Subprovince	Upper Palatine Forest Macroregion	Cham-Furth Depression (Všerubská vrchovina)	IA-3	206	517.0	751 (Kameňák)
Bohemian Massif	Bohemian Forest Subprovince	Bohemian Forest Highlands	Bohemian Forest (Šumava)	IB-1	1,671	921.5	1378 (Plechý)
Bohemian Massif	Bohemian Forest Subprovince	Bohemian Forest Highlands	Bohemian Forest Foothills (Šumavské podhůří)	IB-2	2,407	634.4	1094 (Libín)
Bohemian Massif	Bohemian Forest Subprovince	Bohemian Forest Highlands	Gratzen Mountains (Novohradské hory)	IB-3	162	809.9	1073 (Kamenec)
Bohemian Massif	Bohemian Forest Subprovince	Bohemian Forest Highlands	Gratzen Foothills (Novohradské podhůří)	IB-4	719	555.8	871 (Kohout)
Bohemian Massif	Bohemian-Moravian Subprovince	Central Bohemian Hills	Benešov Uplands (Benešovská pahorkatina)	IIA-1	2,410	366.2	638 (Stráž)
Bohemian Massif	Bohemian-Moravian Subprovince	Central Bohemian Hills	Vlašim Uplands (Vlašimská pahorkatina)	IIA-2	1,232	492.1	724 (Javorová skála)
Bohemian Massif	Bohemian-Moravian Subprovince	Central Bohemian Hills	Tábor Uplands (Táborská pahorkatina)	IIA-3	1,599	449.3	633 (Velký Mehelník)
Bohemian Massif	Bohemian-Moravian Subprovince	Central Bohemian Hills	Blatná Uplands (Blatenská pahorkatina)	IIA-4	1,087	509.2	729 (Drkolná)
Bohemian Massif	Bohemian-Moravian Subprovince	South Bohemian Basins	České Budějovice Basin (Českobudějovická pánev)	IIB-1	640	408.0	480 (Vráže)
Bohemian Massif	Bohemian-Moravian Subprovince	South Bohemian Basins	Třeboň Basin (Třeboňská pánev)	IIB-2	1,360	457.0	583 (Baba)
Bohemian Massif	Bohemian-Moravian Subprovince	Bohemian-Moravian Highlands	Křemešník Highlands (Křemešnická vrchovina)	IIC-1	2,634	551.5	769 (Křemešník)
Bohemian Massif	Bohemian-Moravian Subprovince	Bohemian-Moravian Highlands	Upper Sázava Hills (Hornosázavská pahorkatina)	IIC-2	1,869	463.0	661 (Roudnice)
Bohemian Massif	Bohemian-Moravian Subprovince	Bohemian-Moravian Highlands	Iron Mountains (Železné hory)	IIC-3	748	480.4	738 (U oběšeného)
Bohemian Massif	Bohemian-Moravian Subprovince	Bohemian-Moravian Highlands	Upper Svratka Highlands (Hornosvratecká vrchovina)	IIC-4	1,135	580.2	836 (Devět skal)
Bohemian Massif	Bohemian-Moravian Subprovince	Bohemian-Moravian Highlands	Křižanov Highlands (Křižanovská vrchovina)	IIC-5	2,722	541.2	743 (Harusův kopec)
Bohemian Massif	Bohemian-Moravian Subprovince	Bohemian-Moravian Highlands	Javořice Highlands (Javořická vrchovina)	IIC-6	624	603.5	837 (Javořice)
Bohemian Massif	Bohemian-Moravian Subprovince	Bohemian-Moravian Highlands	Jevišovice Uplands (Jevišovická pahorkatina)	IIC-7	2,010	414.3	634 (Zadní hora)
Bohemian Massif	Bohemian-Moravian Subprovince	Brno Highlands	Boskovice Furrow (Boskovická brázda)	IID-1	409	354.6	553 (Nad Amerikou)
Bohemian Massif	Bohemian-Moravian Subprovince	Brno Highlands	Bobrava Highlands (Bobravská vrchovina)	IID-2	371	316.7	479 (Kopeček)
Bohemian Massif	Bohemian-Moravian Subprovince	Brno Highlands	Drahany Highlands (Drahanská vrchovina)	IID-3	1,183	462.8	735 (Skalky)
Bohemian Massif	Ore Mountains Subprovince	Ore Mountains Highlands	Fichtel Mountains (Smrčiny)	IIIA-1	289	572.1	758 (Háj)
Bohemian Massif	Ore Mountains Subprovince	Ore Mountains Highlands	Ore Mountains (Krušné hory)	IIIA-2	1,607	707.6	1244 (Klínovec)
Bohemian Massif	Ore Mountains Subprovince	Ore Mountains Highlands	Elbe Sandstone Mountains (Děčínská vrchovina)	IIIA-3	278	358.4	724 (Děčínský Sněžník)
Bohemian Massif	Ore Mountains Subprovince	Podkrušnohorská Macroregion	Cheb Basin (Chebská pánev)	IIIB-1	271	458.6	534 (Doubravský vrch)
Bohemian Massif	Ore Mountains Subprovince	Podkrušnohorská Macroregion	Sokolov Basin (Sokolovská pánev)	IIIB-2	312	451.8	570 (Zelený vrch)
Bohemian Massif	Ore Mountains Subprovince	Podkrušnohorská Macroregion	Most Basin (Mostecká pánev)	IIIB-3	1,105	272.1	450 (a contour line)
Bohemian Massif	Ore Mountains Subprovince	Podkrušnohorská Macroregion	Doupov Mountains (Doupovské hory)	IIIB-4	607	558.2	934 (Hradiště)
Bohemian Massif	Ore Mountains Subprovince	Podkrušnohorská Macroregion	Central Bohemian Uplands (České středohoří)	IIIB-5	1,265	362.9	837 (Milešovka)
Bohemian Massif	Ore Mountains Subprovince	Karlovy Vary Highlands	Slavkov Forest (Slavkovský les)	IIIC-1	559	661.8	983 (Lesný)
Bohemian Massif	Ore Mountains Subprovince	Karlovy Vary Highlands	Teplá Highlands (Tepelská vrchovina)	IIIC-2	682	627.3	847 (Podhorní vrch)
Bohemian Massif	Sudetes	Western Sudetes	Lusatian Highlands (Šluknovská pahorkatina)	IVA-1	276	423.4	608 (Hrazený)
Bohemian Massif	Sudetes	Western Sudetes	Lusatian Mountains (Lužické hory)	IVA-2	180	509.2	793 (Luž)
Bohemian Massif	Sudetes	Western Sudetes	Ještěd–Kozákov Ridge (Ještědsko-kozákovský hřbet)	IVA-3	200	518.5	1012 (Ještěd)
Bohemian Massif	Sudetes	Western Sudetes	Zittau Basin (Žitavská pánev)	IVA-4	187	384.2	593 (Prosečský hřeben)
Bohemian Massif	Sudetes	Western Sudetes	Jizera Foothills (Frýdlantská pahorkatina)	IVA-5	241	359.4	572 (Andělský vrch)
Bohemian Massif	Sudetes	Western Sudetes	Jizera Mountains (Jizerské hory)	IVA-6	417	695.8	1124 (Smrk)
Bohemian Massif	Sudetes	Western Sudetes	Giant Mountains (Krkonoše)	IVA-7	454	901.0	1603 (Sněžka)
Bohemian Massif	Sudetes	Western Sudetes	Giant Mountains Foothills (Krkonošské podhůří)	IVA-8	1,247	463.2	839 (Hejlov)
Bohemian Massif	Sudetes	Central Sudetes	Broumov Highlands (Broumovská vrchovina)	IVB-1	535	527.1	881 (Královecký Špičák)
Bohemian Massif	Sudetes	Central Sudetes	Orlické Mountains (Orlické hory)	IVB-2	341	713.0	1116 (Velká Deštná)
Bohemian Massif	Sudetes	Central Sudetes	Orlické Foothills (Podorlická pahorkatina)	IVB-3	1,115	454.1	841 (Špičák)
Bohemian Massif	Sudetes	Central Sudetes	Kłodzko Valley (Kladská kotlina)	IVB-4	58	549.8	585 (Hůrka)
Bohemian Massif	Sudetes	Eastern Sudetes	Zábřeh Highlands (Zábřežská vrchovina)	IVC-1	734	426.5	715 (Lázek)
Bohemian Massif	Sudetes	Eastern Sudetes	Mohelnice Depression (Mohelnická brázda)	IVC-2	119	288.8	333 (Homůlka)
Bohemian Massif	Sudetes	Eastern Sudetes	Hanušovice Highlands (Hanušovická vrchovina)	IVC-3	793	527.2	1003 (Jeřáb)
Bohemian Massif	Sudetes	Eastern Sudetes	Králický Sněžník Mountains (Králický Sněžník)	IVC-4	76	930.9	1423 (Králický Sněžník)
Bohemian Massif	Sudetes	Eastern Sudetes	Golden Mountains (Rychlebské hory)	IVC-5	276	644.7	1127 (Smrk)
Bohemian Massif	Sudetes	Eastern Sudetes	Zlatohorská Highlands (Zlatohorská vrchovina)	IVC-6	527	495.8	975 (Příčný vrch)
Bohemian Massif	Sudetes	Eastern Sudetes	Hrubý Jeseník	IVC-7	530	887.6	1491 (Praděd)
Bohemian Massif	Sudetes	Eastern Sudetes	Nízký Jeseník	IVC-8	2,894	482.5	802 (Slunečná)
Bohemian Massif	Sudetes	Sudeten Foreland	Vidnava Lowland (Vidnavská nížina)	IVD-1	47	270.4	351 (a contour line)
Bohemian Massif	Sudetes	Sudeten Foreland	Žulová Hilly Land (Žulovská pahorkatina)	IVD-2	107	336.8	527 (Boží hora)
Bohemian Massif	Poberounská Subprovince	Brdy Macroregion	Džbán	VA-1	311	416.6	538 (Louštín)
Bohemian Massif	Poberounská Subprovince	Brdy Macroregion	Prague Plateau (Pražská plošina)	VA-2	1,128	302.5	435 (Na rovinách)
Bohemian Massif	Poberounská Subprovince	Brdy Macroregion	Křivoklát Highlands (Křivoklátská vrchovina)	VA-3	745	417.8	723 (Radeč)
Bohemian Massif	Poberounská Subprovince	Brdy Macroregion	Hořovice Uplands (Hořovická pahorkatina)	VA-4	427	352.7	499 (Bacín)
Bohemian Massif	Poberounská Subprovince	Brdy Macroregion	Brdy Highlands (Brdská vrchovina)	VA-5	827	556.0	865 (Tok)
Bohemian Massif	Poberounská Subprovince	Plzeň Uplands	Rakovník Uplands (Rakovnická pahorkatina)	VB-1	1,003	439.6	677 (Lišák)
Bohemian Massif	Poberounská Subprovince	Plzeň Uplands	Plasy Uplands (Plaská pahorkatina)	VB-2	2,180	423.3	704 (Vlčí hora)
Bohemian Massif	Poberounská Subprovince	Plzeň Uplands	Švihov Highlands (Švihovská vrchovina)	VB-3	1,424	460.3	773 (Koráb)
Bohemian Massif	Bohemian Table	North Bohemian Table	Ralsko Uplands (Ralská pahorkatina)	VIA-1	1,356	318.2	698 (Ralsko)
Bohemian Massif	Bohemian Table	North Bohemian Table	Jičín Uplands (Jičínská pahorkatina)	VIA-2	1,244	305.6	562 (Sokol)
Bohemian Massif	Bohemian Table	Central Bohemian Table	Lower Ohře Table (Dolnooharská tabule)	VIB-1	1,139	229.2	461 (Říp)
Bohemian Massif	Bohemian Table	Central Bohemian Table	Jizera Table (Jizerská tabule)	VIB-2	949	260.2	410 (Rokytská horka)
Bohemian Massif	Bohemian Table	Central Bohemian Table	Central Elbe Table (Středolabská tabule)	VIB-3	2,266	215.0	400 (a contour line)
Bohemian Massif	Bohemian Table	East Bohemian Table	East Elbe Table (Východolabská tabule)	VIC-1	1,689	251.5	352 (Na šancích)
Bohemian Massif	Bohemian Table	East Bohemian Table	Orlice Table (Orlická tabule)	VIC-2	966	290.6	454 (U rozhledny)
Bohemian Massif	Bohemian Table	East Bohemian Table	Svitavy Uplands (Svitavská pahorkatina)	VIC-3	1,692	412.2	693 (Baldský vrch)
North European Plain	Polish Plain	Silesian Lowlands	Opava Hilly Land (Opavská pahorkatina)	VIIA-1	394	258.3	340 (a contour line)
Western Carpathians	Outer Subcarpathia	Western Outer Subcarpathia	Dyje–Svratka Valley (Dyjsko-svratecký úval)	VIIIA-1	1,452	210.0	355 (Výhon)
Western Carpathians	Outer Subcarpathia	Western Outer Subcarpathia	Vyškov Gate (Vyškovská brána)	VIIIA-2	141	226.5	339 (Na hanácké)
Western Carpathians	Outer Subcarpathia	Western Outer Subcarpathia	Upper Morava Valley (Hornomoravský úval)	VIIIA-3	1,315	225.8	345 (Jelení vrch)
Western Carpathians	Outer Subcarpathia	Western Outer Subcarpathia	Moravian Gate (Moravská brána)	VIIIA-4	534	263.5	375 (a contour line)
Western Carpathians	Outer Subcarpathia	Northern Outer Subcarpathia	Ostrava Basin (Ostravská pánev)	VIIIB-1	486	244.0	337 (Kouty)
Western Carpathians	Outer Western Carpathians	South-Moravian Carpathians	Mikulov Highlands (Mikulovská vrchovina)	IXA-1	81	263.4	550 (Děvín)
Western Carpathians	Outer Western Carpathians	Central Moravian Carpathians	Ždánice Forest (Ždánický les)	IXB-1	470	270.7	439 (U Slepice)
Western Carpathians	Outer Western Carpathians	Central Moravian Carpathians	Litenčice Hills (Litenčická pahorkatina)	IXB-2	590	293.7	519 (Hradisko)
Western Carpathians	Outer Western Carpathians	Central Moravian Carpathians	Chřiby	IXB-3	335	342.6	587 (Brdo)
Western Carpathians	Outer Western Carpathians	Central Moravian Carpathians	Kyjov Hills (Kyjovská pahorkatina)	IXB-4	482	235.2	417 (Babí lom)
Western Carpathians	Outer Western Carpathians	Slovak-Moravian Carpathians	Vizovice Highlands (Vizovická vrchovina)	IXC-1	1,399	338.7	753 (Klášťov)
Western Carpathians	Outer Western Carpathians	Slovak-Moravian Carpathians	White Carpathians (Bílé Karpaty)	IXC-2	575	473.0	970 (Velká Javořina)
Western Carpathians	Outer Western Carpathians	Slovak-Moravian Carpathians	Maple Mountains (Javorníky)	IXC-3	229	631.6	1019 (Malý Javorník)
Western Carpathians	Outer Western Carpathians	Western Beskidian Foothills	Moravian-Silesian Foothills (Podbeskydská pahorkatina)	IXD-1	1,508	353.0	964 (Skalka)
Western Carpathians	Outer Western Carpathians	Western Beskids	Hostýn-Vsetín Mountains (Hostýnsko-vsetínská hornatina)	IXE-1	629	552.9	1024 (Vysoká)
Western Carpathians	Outer Western Carpathians	Western Beskids	Rožnov Furrow (Rožnovská brázda)	IXE-2	109	486.5	576 (Poskla)
Western Carpathians	Outer Western Carpathians	Western Beskids	Moravian-Silesian Beskids (Moravskoslezské Beskydy)	IXE-3	623	703.3	1324 (Lysá hora)
Western Carpathians	Outer Western Carpathians	Western Beskids	Jablunkov Furrow (Jablunkovská brázda)	IXE-4	74	441.9	577 (a contour line)
Western Carpathians	Outer Western Carpathians	Western Beskids	Silesian Beskids (Slezské Beskydy)	IXE-5	54	613.7	995 (Velká Čantoryje)
Western Carpathians	Outer Western Carpathians	Western Beskids	Jablunkov Intermontane (Jablunkovské mezihoří)	IXE-6	26	592.3	840 (Girova)
Western Pannonian Plain	Vienna Basin	South Moravian Basin (Note: South Moravian Basin consists of only one mesoregion.)	Lower Morava Valley (Dolnomoravský úval)	XA-1	965	183.2	322 (Žerotín)
Western Pannonian Plain	Vienna Basin	Záhorie Lowland	Chvojnice Hills (Chvojnická pahorkatina)	XB-1	5	210.0	266 (Staré hory)
