= Mrákotín (Jihlava District) =

- Market town
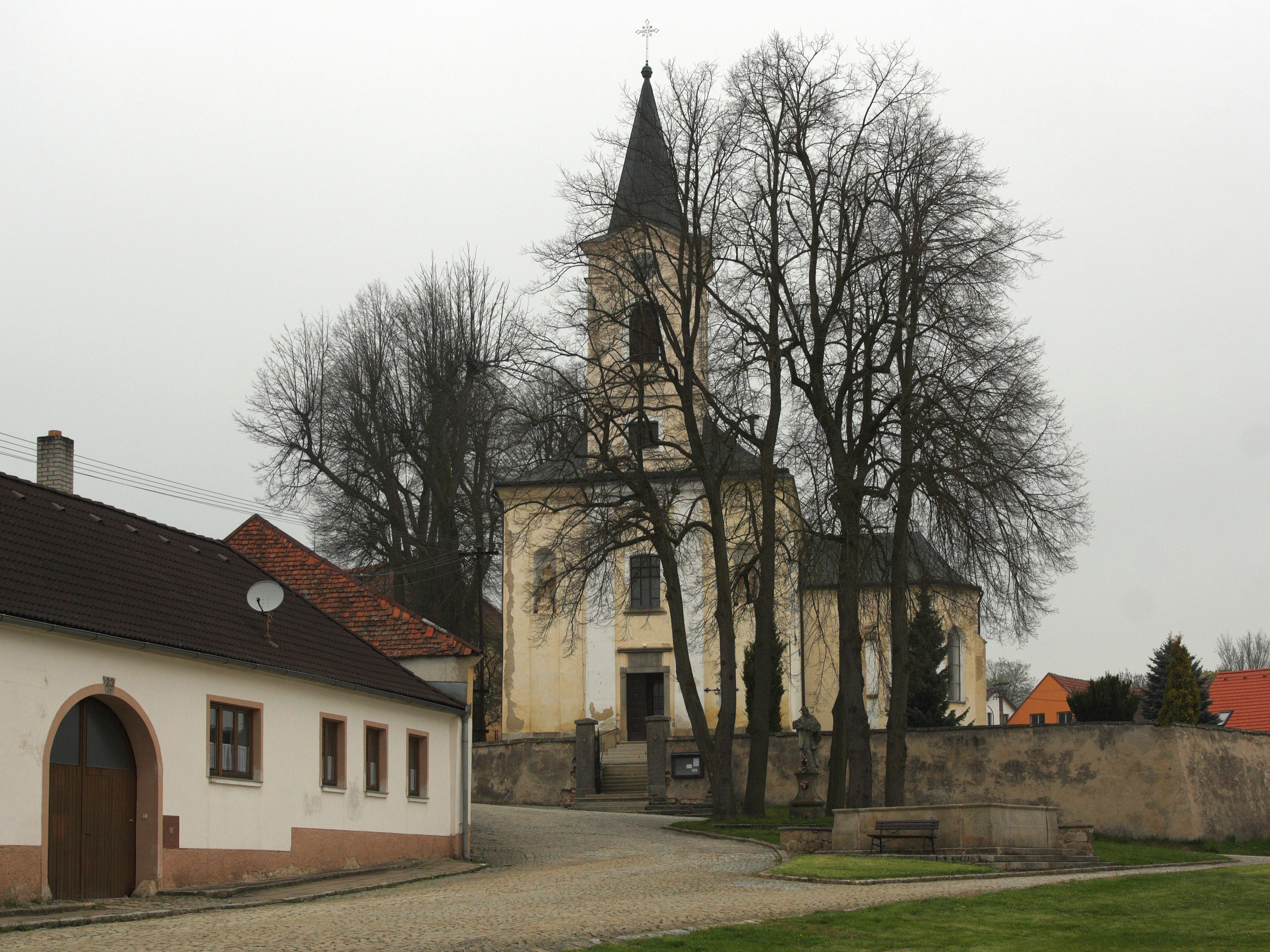
- Church of Saint Giles

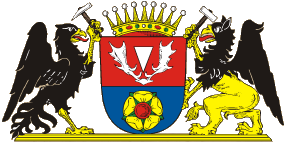
- Flag Coat of arms

- Location in the Czech Republic
- Coordinates: 49°11′22″N 15°22′34″E
- Country: Czech Republic
- Region: Vysočina
- District: Jihlava
- First mentioned: 1385

Area
  - Total: 18.27 km^{2} (7.05 sq mi)
- Elevation: 545 m (1,788 ft)

Population (2026-01-01)
  - Total: 870
  - Density: 48/km^{2} (120/sq mi)
- Time zone: UTC+1 (CET)
  - Summer (DST): UTC+2 (CEST)
- Postal code: 588 54
- Website: www.mestysmrakotin.cz

Mrákotín (Czech pronunciation: [ˈmraːkociːn]) is a market town in Jihlava District in the Vysočina Region of the Czech Republic. It has about 900 inhabitants. It is known for granite quarrying.

== Administrative division ==
Mrákotín consists of three municipal parts (in brackets population according to the 2021 census):

- Mrákotín (766)
- Dobrá Voda (61)
- Praskolesy (19)

== Etymology ==
The name of the settlement was derived from the personal name Mrákota.

== Geography ==
Mrákotín is located about 27 kilometres (17 mi) southwest of Jihlava. It lies on the border between the Křižanov Highlands and Javořice Highlands. The highest point is the Javořice mountain at 837 m (2,746 ft) above sea level, which is the highest peak of the Javořice Highlands and of the whole Bohemian-Moravian Highlands area. The Myslůvka stream flows through the market town. The territory is rich in fishponds.

== History ==
The first written mention of Mrákotín is from 1385. It is not certain when the village was promoted to a market town. It is first referred to as a market town on a seal from 1569.

== Demographics ==
Historical population

Year	Pop.	±%
1869	933	—
1880	1,022	+9.5%
1890	1,116	+9.2%
1900	1,129	+1.2%
1910	1,183	+4.8%

Year	Pop.	±%
1921	1,145	−3.2%
1930	1,126	−1.7%
1950	994	−11.7%
1961	1,055	+6.1%
1970	949	−10.0%

Year	Pop.	±%
1980	1,007	+6.1%
1991	929	−7.7%
2001	925	−0.4%
2011	843	−8.9%
2021	846	+0.4%

Source: Censuses

== Economy ==
Mrákotín is known for to granite quarrying. About 1,500 m^{3} (53,000 cu ft) of granite are mined annually in the local quarry.

== Transport ==
The I/23 road from Třebíč to Jindřichův Hradec runs through the market town.

== Sights ==
The main landmark of Mrákotín is the Church of Saint Giles. The originally Gothic church was first documented in 1398. In 1806–1807, it was rebuilt in the Neoclassical style.

The Church of Saint Joachim is located at Dobrá Voda. It is an early Baroque church from 1682.
