= Javorice =

Javorice may refer to:

- Javorice, a name common among African Americans
- Javořice (meaning 'Maple hill'), a mountain in the Czech Republic
