= Doupě =

- Municipality
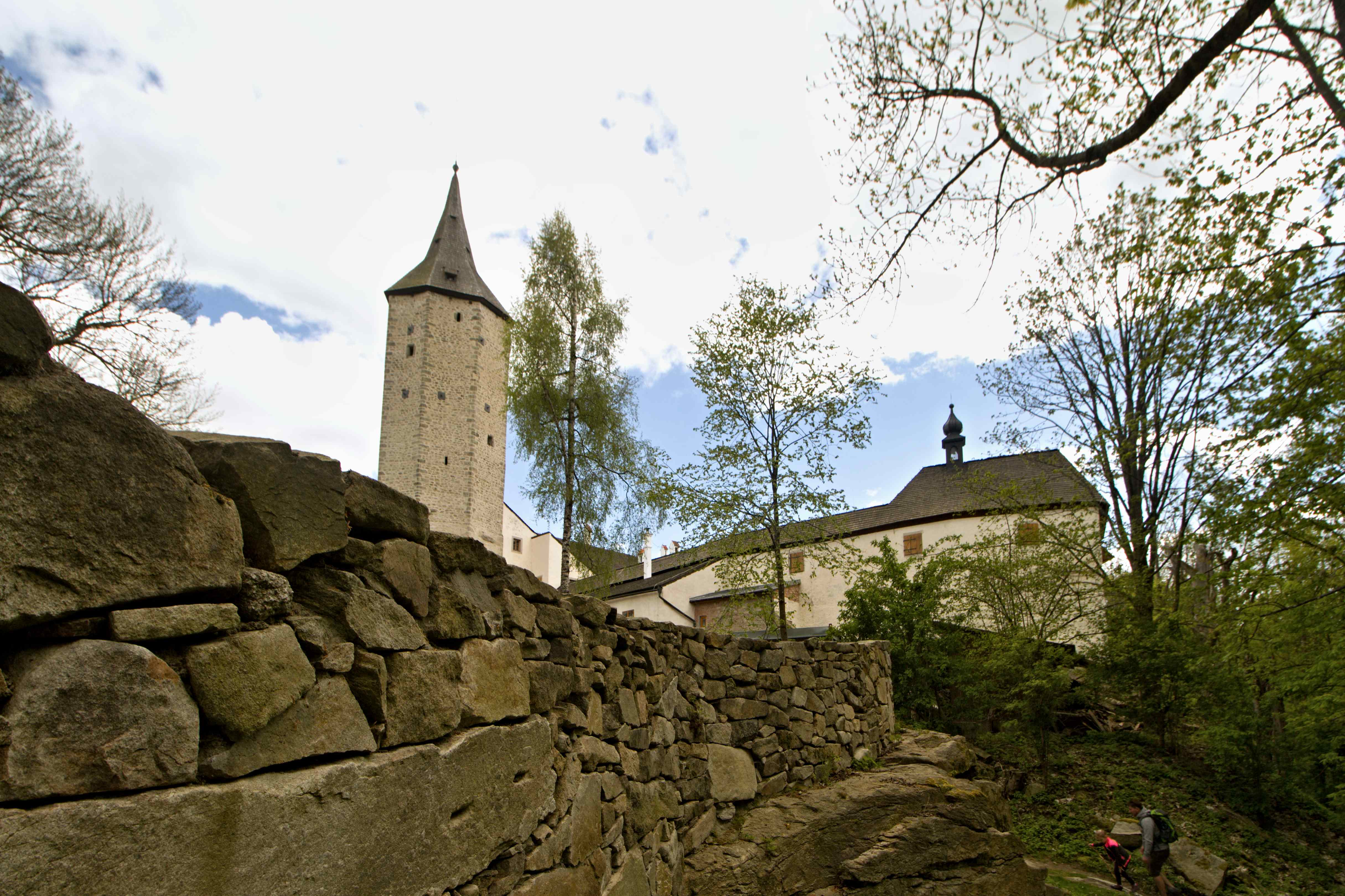
- Roštejn Castle

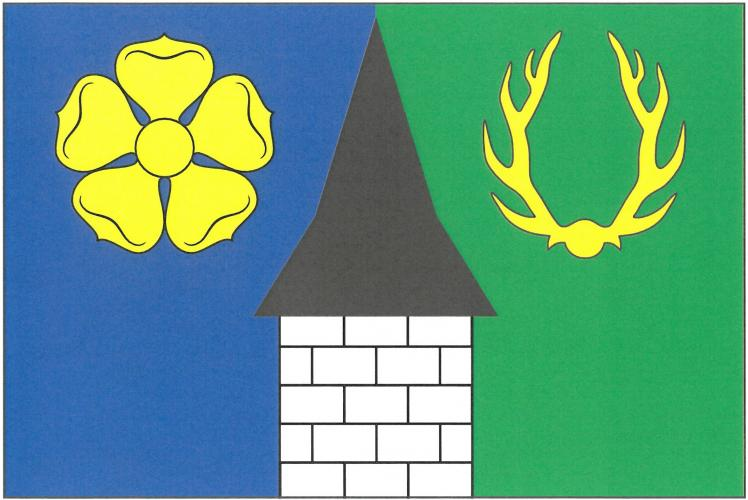
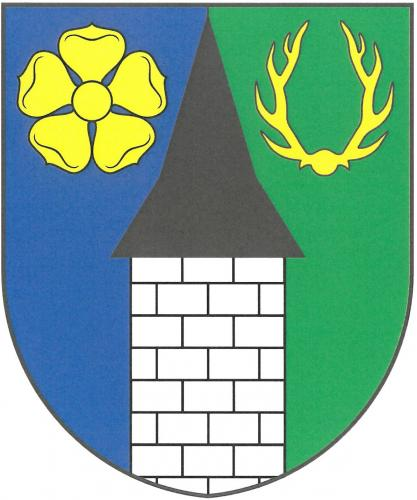
- Flag Coat of arms

- Location in the Czech Republic
- Coordinates: 49°14′13″N 15°26′5″E
- Country: Czech Republic
- Region: Vysočina
- District: Jihlava
- First mentioned: 1580

Area
  - Total: 5.12 km^{2} (1.98 sq mi)
- Elevation: 593 m (1,946 ft)

Population (2026-01-01)
  - Total: 112
  - Density: 21.9/km^{2} (56.7/sq mi)
- Time zone: UTC+1 (CET)
  - Summer (DST): UTC+2 (CEST)
- Postal code: 588 56
- Website: www.obecdoupe.cz

Doupě (Czech pronunciation: [ˈdoupjɛ]) is a municipality and village in Jihlava District in the Vysočina Region of the Czech Republic. It has about 100 inhabitants.

== Etymology ==
In Czech, the name literally means 'den'. Figuratively, it refers to the enclosed valley in which the village is located.

== Geography ==
Doupě is located about 21 kilometres (13 mi) southwest of Jihlava. The southern part of the municipal territory with the village lies in the Křižanov Highlands. The northern forested part lies in the Javořice Highlands. The highest point is the hill Vyštěnec at 688 m (2,257 ft) above sea level. The territory is rich in fishponds.

== History ==
The first written mention of Doupě is from 1580.

== Demographics ==
Historical population

Year	Pop.	±%
1869	160	—
1880	163	+1.9%
1890	174	+6.7%
1900	191	+9.8%
1910	207	+8.4%

Year	Pop.	±%
1921	209	+1.0%
1930	270	+29.2%
1950	165	−38.9%
1961	143	−13.3%
1970	148	+3.5%

Year	Pop.	±%
1980	107	−27.7%
1991	83	−22.4%
2001	87	+4.8%
2011	102	+17.2%
2021	96	−5.9%

Source: Censuses

== Transport ==
There are no railways or major roads passing through the municipality.

== Sights ==
Doupě is known for the Roštejn Castle. The first written mention of the castle is from 1353. Today it is owned by the Vysočina Region and managed by the Vysočina Museum in Jihlava. The castle is open to the public and belongs to the most visited tourist destinations in the region.
