= Orličky =

- Municipality
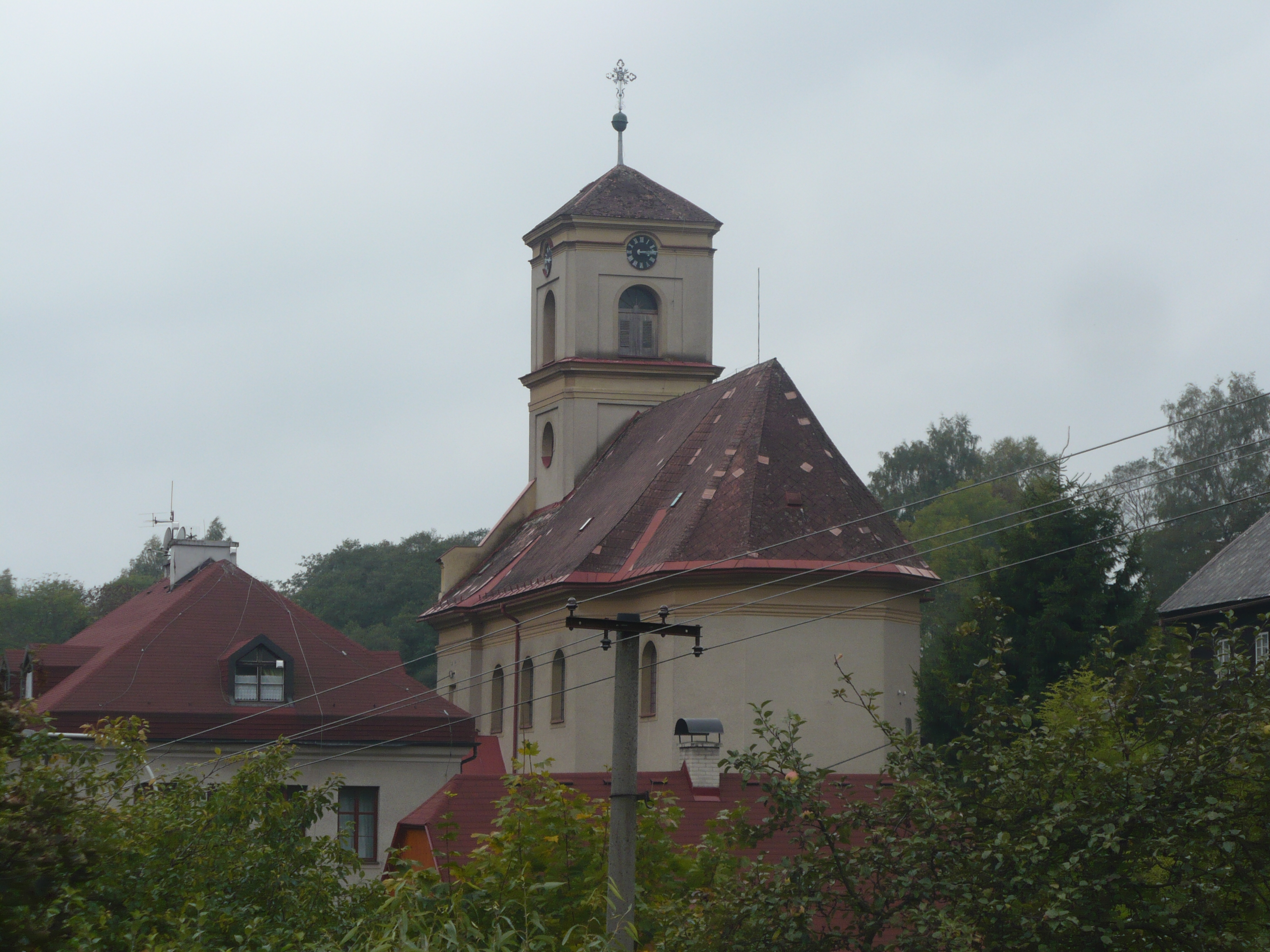
- Church of Saint John of Nepomuk

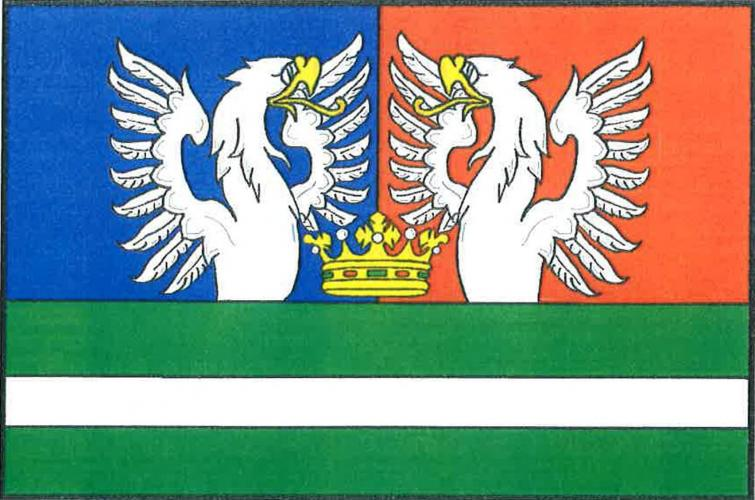
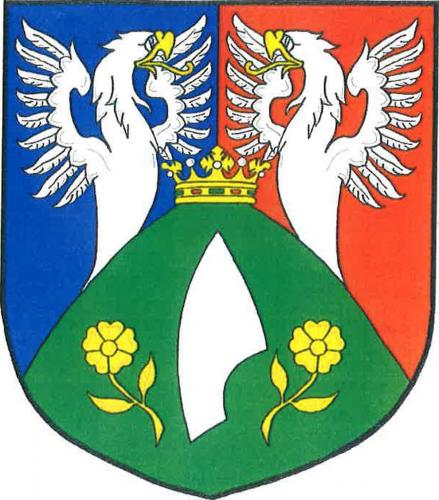
- Flag Coat of arms

- Location in the Czech Republic
- Coordinates: 50°1′54″N 16°40′54″E
- Country: Czech Republic
- Region: Pardubice
- District: Ústí nad Orlicí
- First mentioned: 1588

Area
  - Total: 8.64 km^{2} (3.34 sq mi)
- Elevation: 596 m (1,955 ft)

Population (2026-01-01)
  - Total: 267
  - Density: 30.9/km^{2} (80.0/sq mi)
- Time zone: UTC+1 (CET)
  - Summer (DST): UTC+2 (CEST)
- Postal code: 561 55
- Website: www.obecorlicky.cz

Orličky (German: Adlerdörfel) is a municipality and village in Ústí nad Orlicí District in the Pardubice Region of the Czech Republic. It has about 300 inhabitants.

Orličky lies approximately 22 kilometres (14 mi) east of Ústí nad Orlicí, 65 km (40 mi) east of Pardubice, and 162 km (101 mi) east of Prague.

== Demographics ==
Historical population
Year	Pop.	±%
1869	1,064	—
1880	1,036	−2.6%
1890	1,059	+2.2%
1900	893	−15.7%
1910	800	−10.4%
1921	762	−4.7%
1930	709	−7.0%
1950	337	−52.5%
1961	309	−8.3%
1970	309	+0.0%
1980	279	−9.7%
1991	251	−10.0%
2001	279	+11.2%
2011	293	+5.0%
2021	269	−8.2%
Source: Censuses
