= Bohemian-Moravian Highlands =

Geomorphological macroregion and highlands in the Czech Republic

Coordinates: 49°28′N 16°00′E

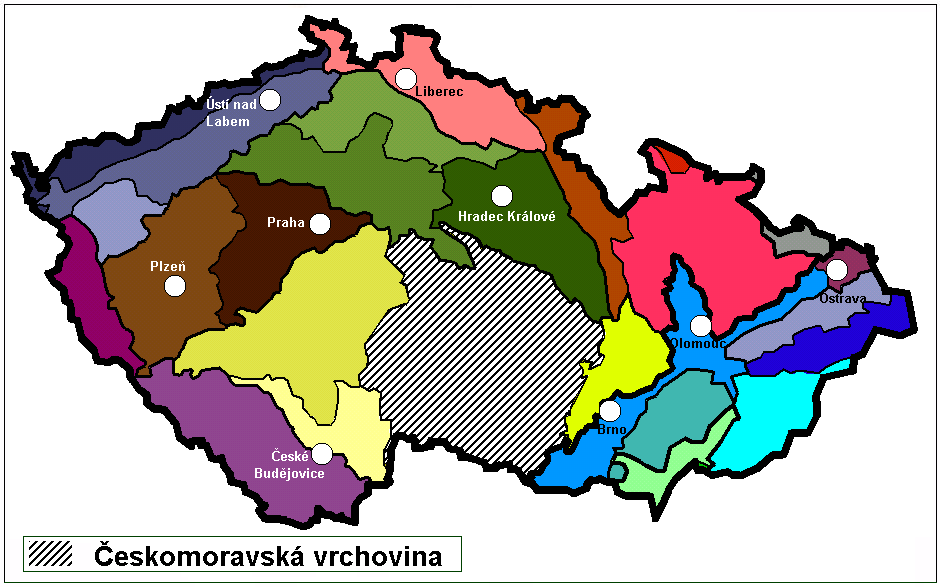
The Bohemian-Moravian Highlands within the geomorphological division of the Czech Republic

The Bohemian-Moravian Highlands (Czech: Českomoravská vrchovina, colloquially Vysočina; German: Böhmisch-Mährische Höhe) is a geomorphological macroregion and highland in the Czech Republic. Its highest peaks are the Javořice at 836.5 metres (2,744 ft) and Devět skal in the north (836.3 metres (2,744 ft)). The Bohemian-Moravian Heights were previously known as the Moravian Heights.

== Location ==
The Bohemian-Moravian Highlands are an extensive and long range of hills and low mountains over 150 kilometres (93 mi) long, which runs in a northeasterly direction across the central part of the Czech Republic from Bohemia to Moravia. This range roughly coincides with modern Vysočina Region.

== Characteristics ==
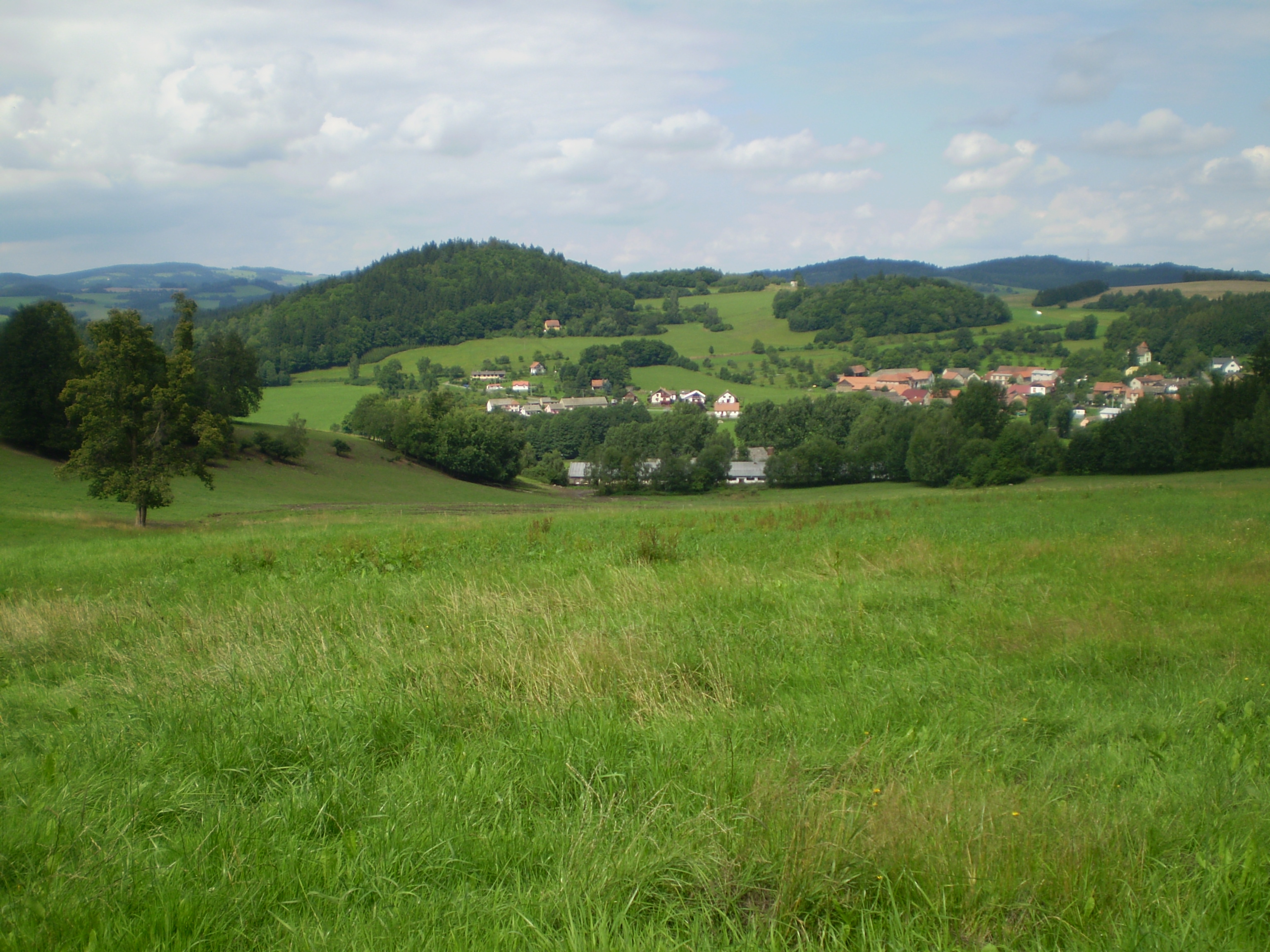
Typical landscape

The highlands form a big region of rolling hills and low mountains with heights between about 500 and 800 metres, whose lowlands are relatively densely settled. Its gentle hills are dotted with small farmsteads and also occasionally with holiday apartments and houses. The softly, rounded summits offer panoramic views of the surrounding countryside, valleys and castles to hikers and holidaymakers, as well as a variety of sporting facilities.

== Division ==
Geomorphological division of the Bohemian-Moravian Highlands, including highest peaks:

Křemešník Highlands	Jindřichův Hradec Hills	Čihadlo (665 m)
Křemešník Highlands	Pacov Hills	Lísek (760 m)
Křemešník Highlands	Želiv Hills	Na altánku (633 m)
Křemešník Highlands	Humpolec Highlands	Křemešník (765 m)
Upper Sázava Hills	Kutná Hora Plateau	Za stodolami (537 m)
Upper Sázava Hills	Světlá Hills	Žebrákovský kopec (601 m)
Upper Sázava Hills	Havlíčkův Brod Hills	Roudnice (661 m)
Upper Sázava Hills	Jihlava-Sázava Furrow	Kázek (567 m)
Iron Mountains	Chvaletice Hills	Krkanka (568 m)
Iron Mountains	Seč Highlands	U oběšeného (737 m)
Upper Svratka Highlands	Žďárské vrchy	Devět skal (836 m)
Upper Svratka Highlands	Nedvědice Highlands	Horní les (774 m)
Křižanov Highlands	Bíteš Highlands	Harusův kopec (741 m)
Křižanov Highlands	Brtnice Highlands	Velký Špičák (734 m)
Křižanov Highlands	Dačice Valley	Ivanův kopec (644 m)
Javořice Highlands	Jihlava Hills	Javořice (837 m)
Javořice Highlands	Nová Bystřice Highlands	Vysoký kámen (738 m)
Jevišovice Uplands	Jemnice Valley	Vráž (576 m)
Jevišovice Uplands	Bítov Hills	Suchá hora (571 m)
Jevišovice Uplands	Jaroměřice Valley	Zadní hora (634 m)
Jevišovice Uplands	Znojmo Hills	Na skalném (556 m)
