= Mrákotín (Chrudim District) =

- Municipality
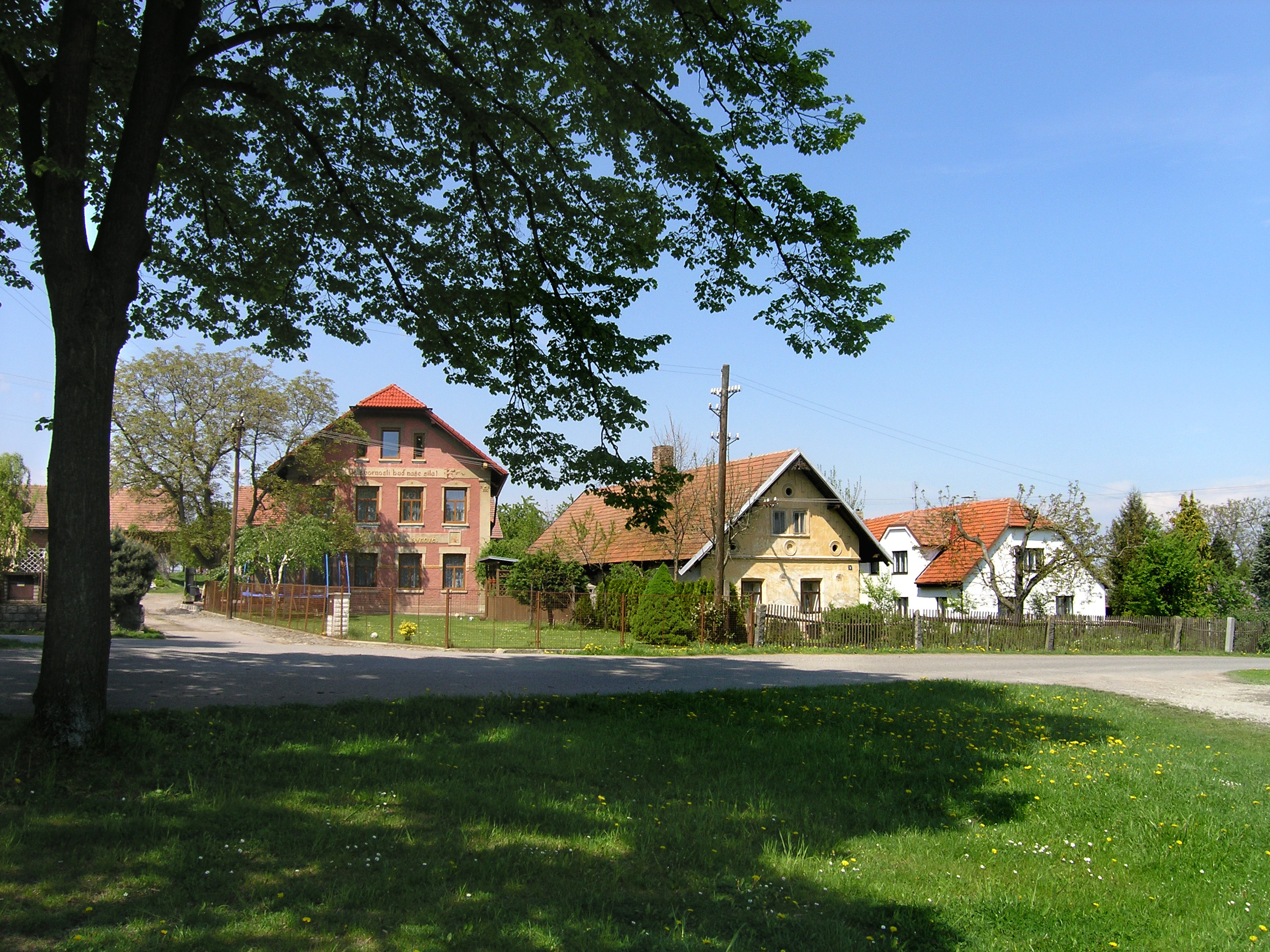
- Centre of Mrákotín

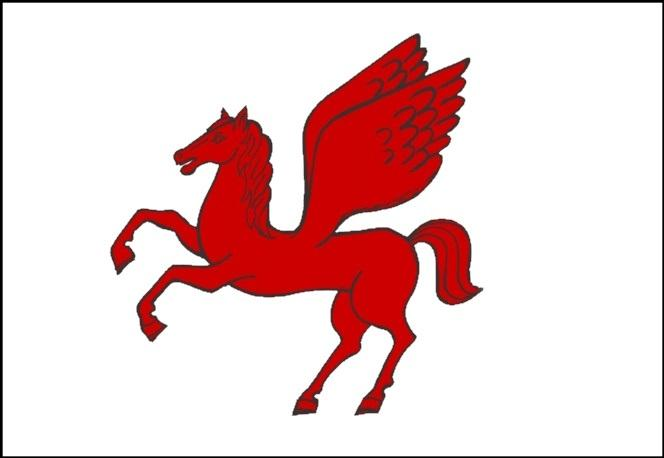
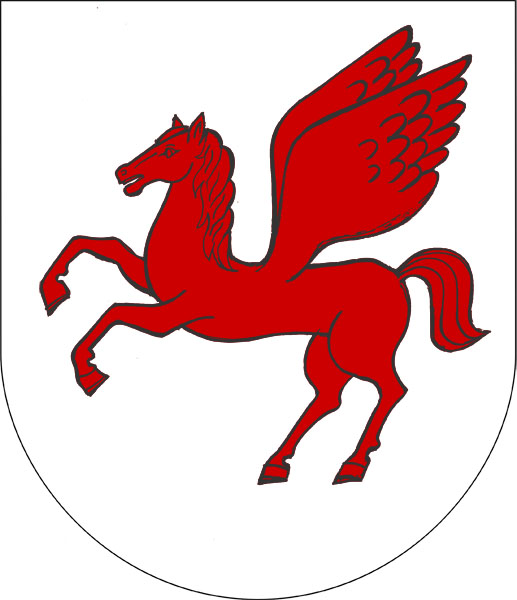
- Flag Coat of arms

- Location in the Czech Republic
- Coordinates: 49°48′53″N 15°57′24″E
- Country: Czech Republic
- Region: Pardubice
- District: Chrudim
- First mentioned: 1456

Area
  - Total: 5.18 km^{2} (2.00 sq mi)
- Elevation: 453 m (1,486 ft)

Population (2026-01-01)
  - Total: 347
  - Density: 67.0/km^{2} (173/sq mi)
- Time zone: UTC+1 (CET)
  - Summer (DST): UTC+2 (CEST)
- Postal code: 539 01
- Website: www.obecmrakotin.cz

Mrákotín is a municipality and village in Chrudim District in the Pardubice Region of the Czech Republic. It has about 300 inhabitants.

It is located about 28 kilometres (17 mi) southeast of Pardubice and 112 km (70 mi) east of Prague.

== Administrative division ==
Mrákotín consists of two municipal parts (in brackets population according to the 2021 census):

- Mrákotín (287)
- Oflenda (30)

== History ==
The first written mention of Mrákotín is from 1456.

== Demographics ==
Historical population
Year	Pop.	±%
1869	461	—
1880	460	−0.2%
1890	460	+0.0%
1900	458	−0.4%
1910	476	+3.9%
1921	511	+7.4%
1930	559	+9.4%
1950	453	−19.0%
1961	465	+2.6%
1970	427	−8.2%
1980	411	−3.7%
1991	358	−12.9%
2001	354	−1.1%
2011	349	−1.4%
2021	317	−9.2%
Source: Censuses
