= False lily of the valley =

False lily of the valley may refer to:

- Maianthemum bifolium also known as May lily, native from western Europe east to Siberia, China and Japan
- Maianthemum canadense, also known as Canadian May-lily, Canada Mayflower, Canadian Lily-of-the-valley, Wild Lily-of-the-valley, or Two-leaved Solomonseal, native to the sub-boreal conifer forests in Canada and the northern United States
- Maianthemum dilatatum, also known as snakeberry and two-leaved Solomon's seal, native to western North America and Asia across the Kamchatka Peninsula, Japan, and Korea
