= Javořice Highlands =

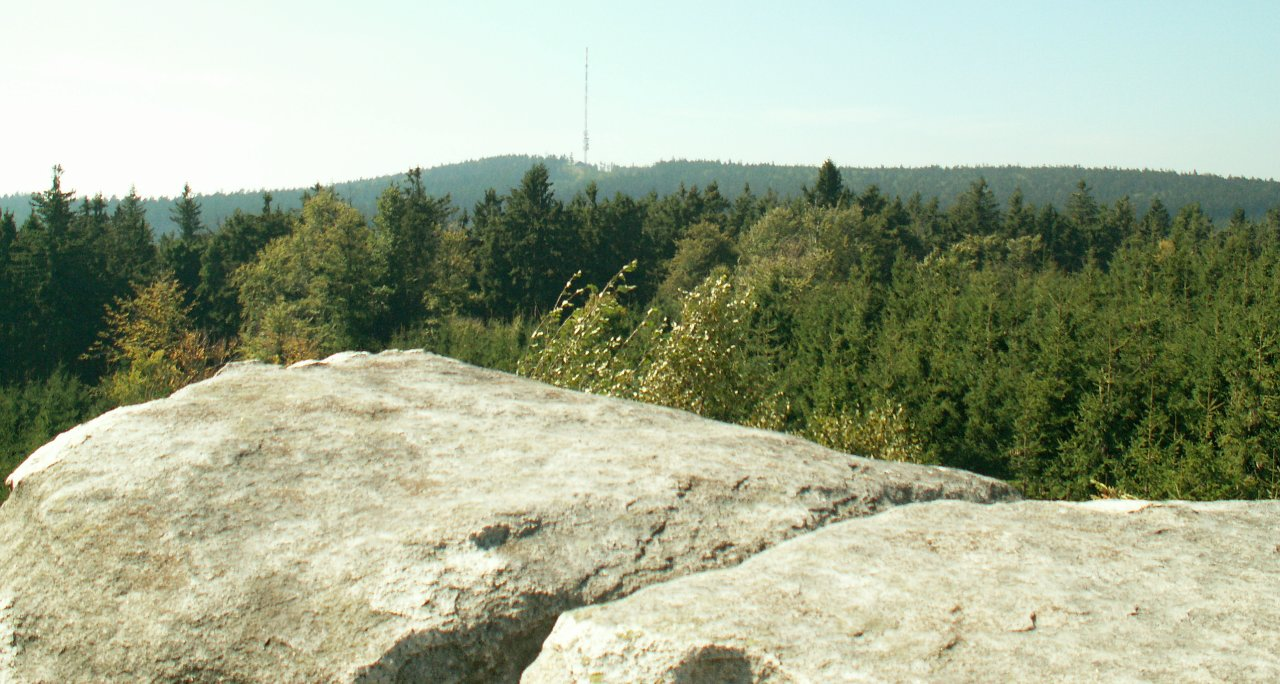
- Look from Míchova rocks

Highest point
- Peak: Javořice
- Elevation: 837 m (2,746 ft)

Dimensions
- Length: 68 km (42 mi)
- Area: 624 km^{2} (241 mi^{2})

Geography
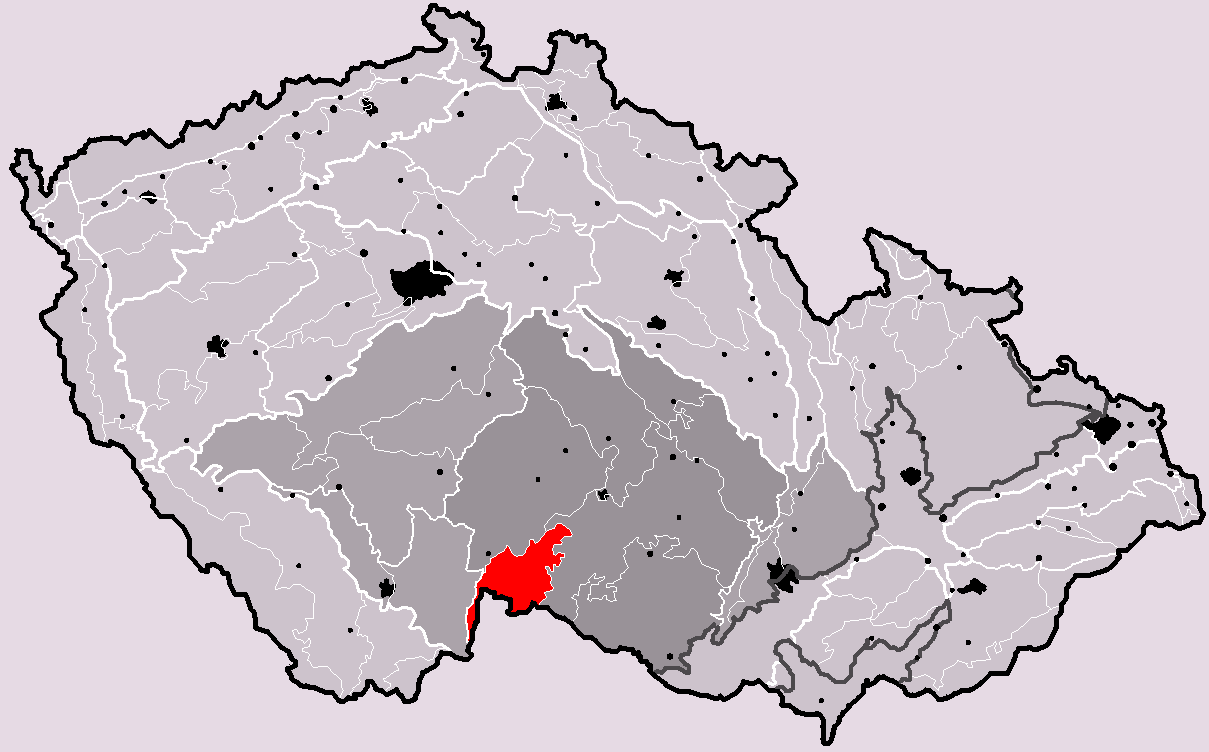
- Javořice Highlands in the geomorphological system of the Czech Republic
- Country: Czech Republic
- Regions: Vysočina, South Bohemian
- Range coordinates: 49°5′N 15°11′E
- Parent range: Bohemian-Moravian Highlands

Geology
- Orogeny: Variscan
- Rock age: Paleozoic
- Rock type: Granite

The Javořice Highlands (Czech: Javořická vrchovina, German: Jaborschützer Bergeland) is a mountain range in the Czech Republic. The highlands, together with the Jevišovice Highlands threshold, form the Western-Moravian part of Moldanubian Zone - east south part of Bohemian Massif.

== Geography ==
The Javořice Highlands rise to the north of the Gmünd, Lower Austria between Slavonice, and the Studená and Mrákotín in the north. The Highlands have an area of 624 square kilometres (241 sq mi) and an average height of 604 metres (1,982 ft). The highest peak is Javořice at 837 metres (2,746 ft); other peaks are Hradisko 760 metres (2,490 ft), Pivničky 760 metres (2,490 ft) Vysoký kámen 723 metres (2,372 ft), Bukový vrch 721 metres (2,365 ft), Starohuťský vrch 704 metres (2,310 ft), and Čihadlo 700 metres (2,300 ft).

To the southeast is the Holbruner Wald (Holbrun Forest) in Lower Austria part of Javořice Highlands as well and in the east Jevišovice Highlands. The Javořice Highlands naturally established Bohemian-Moravian border. The mountain range is 76% forested, though mainly by plantations. The forests are in good condition. For the landscape ary typical numerous bogs and ponds.

The primary composition of the range is carboniferous-cambrian granite and granodiorite. Quartz veins are common. Soil horizon is mainly cambisol.

The Thaya (parallel valley), and Jihlava (source), Nežárka (source) as well among others, originates here.

== Towns ==
The area is sparsely populated. There are no larger settlements. The most populated towns in the highlands are Nová Bystřice and Strmilov.

== Gallery ==
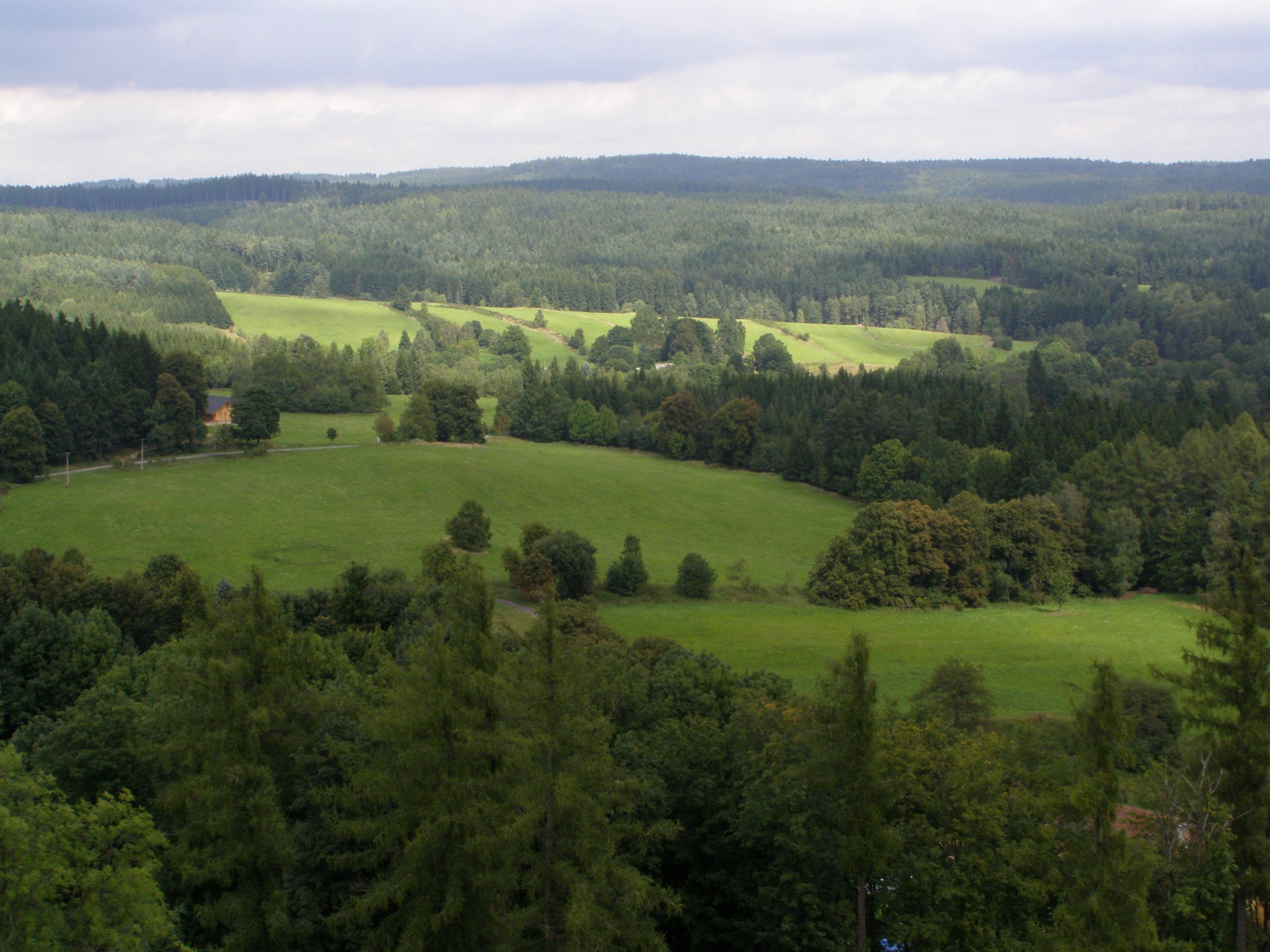
Look from Landštejn castle to Moravia

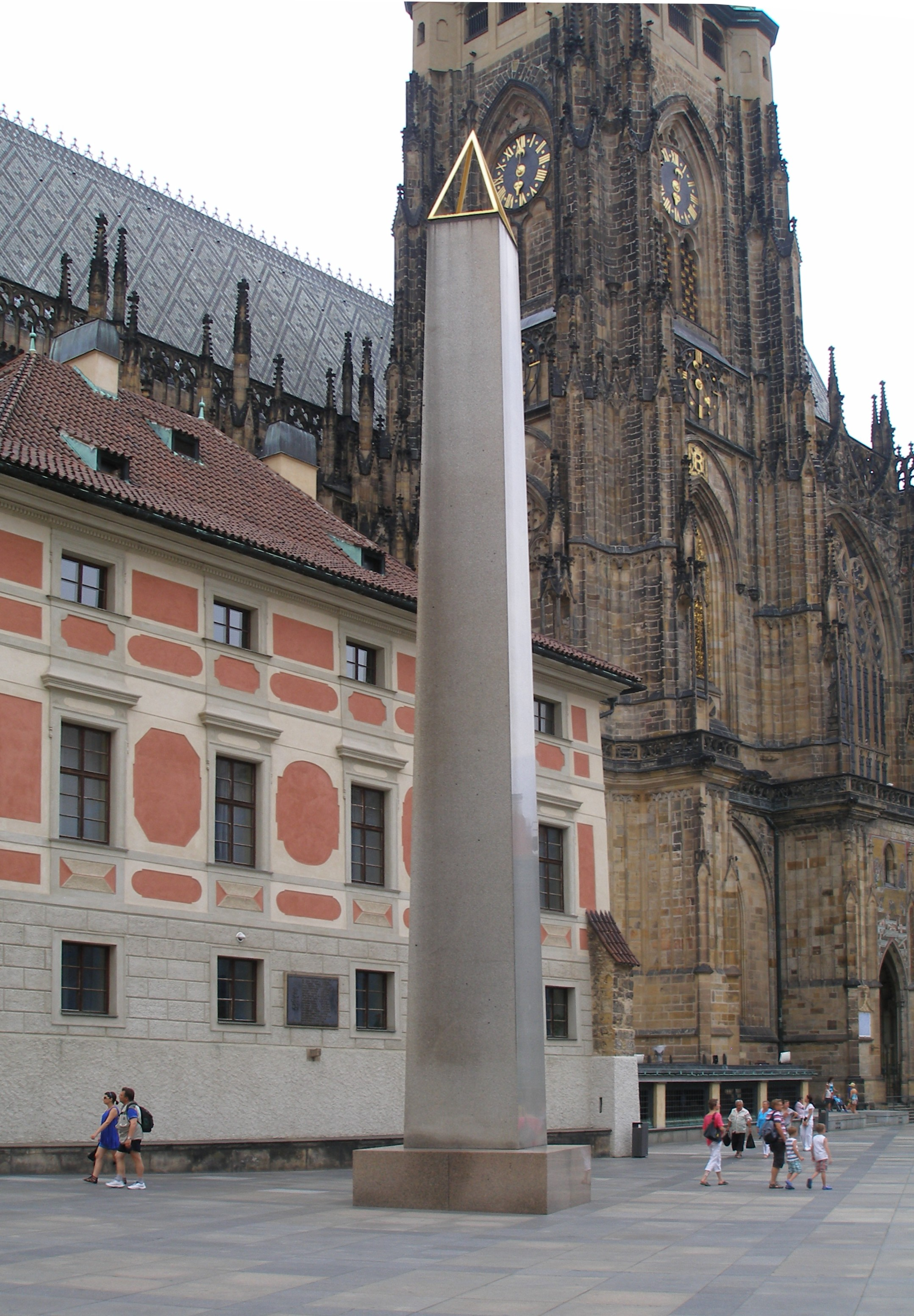
15.5 m high obelisk in Prague Castle originating from Javořice massif

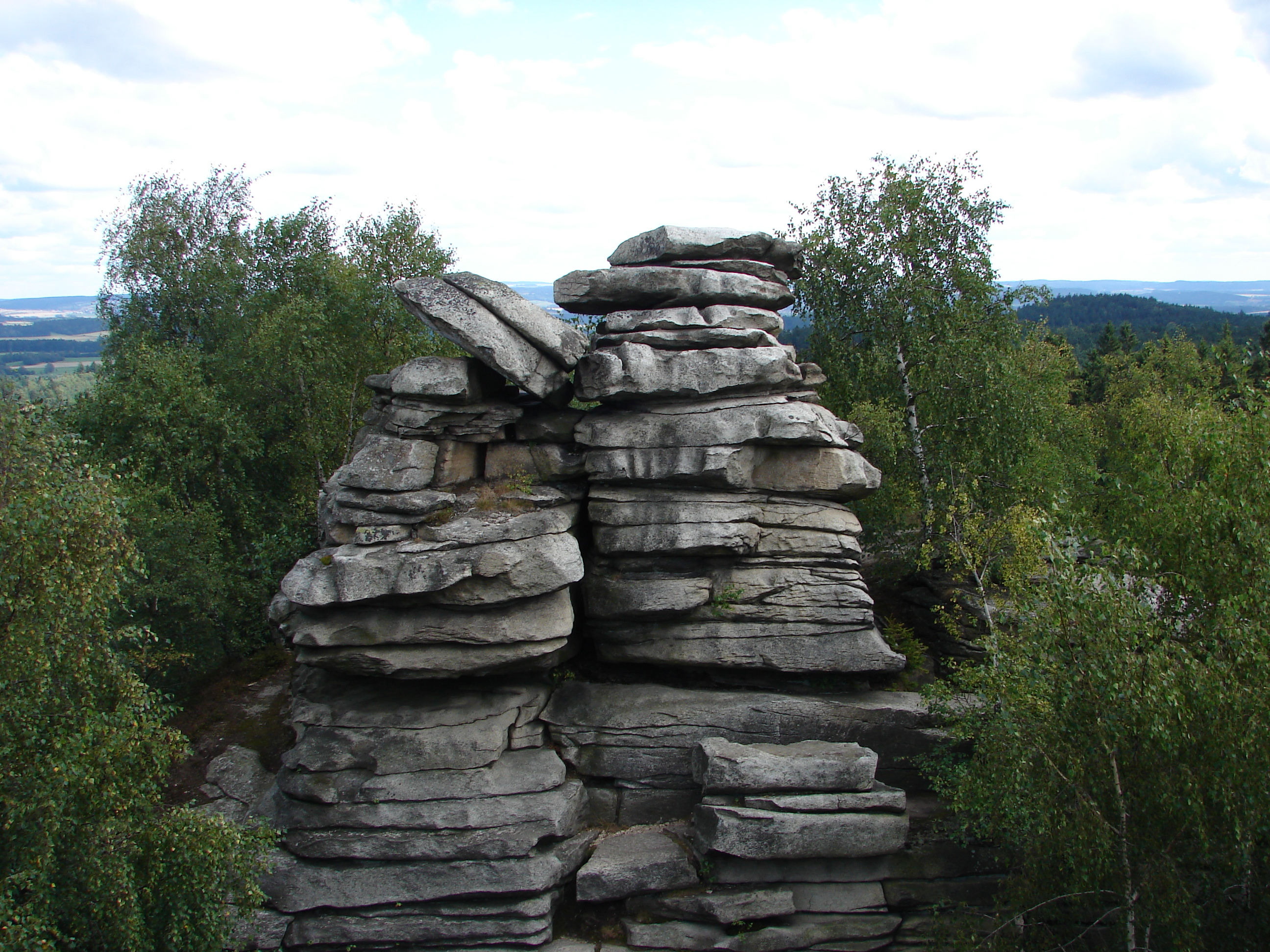
The Cheesewring rock Míchova skála

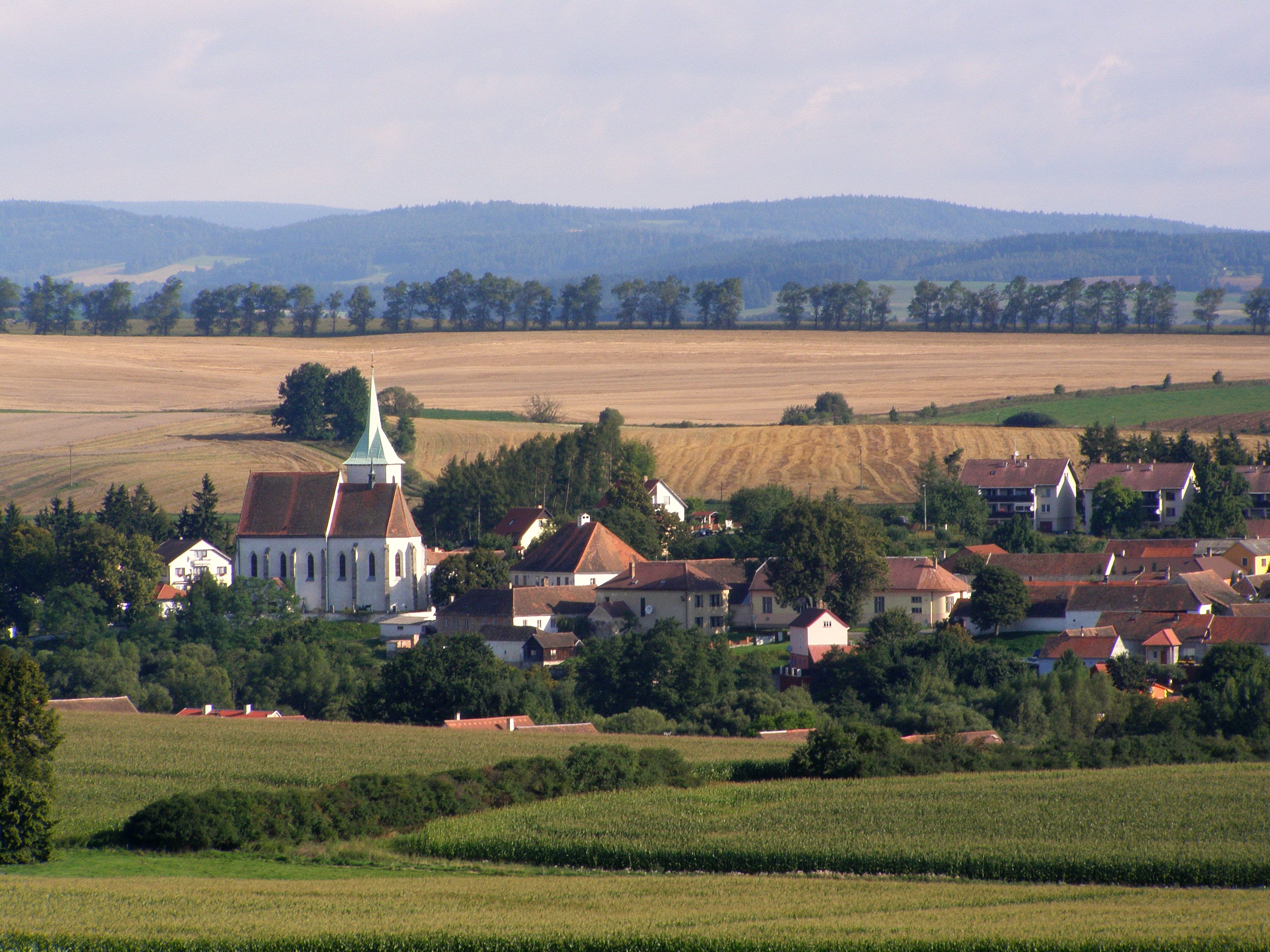
Cizkrajov – Javořice Highlands on horizon
