= Javořice =

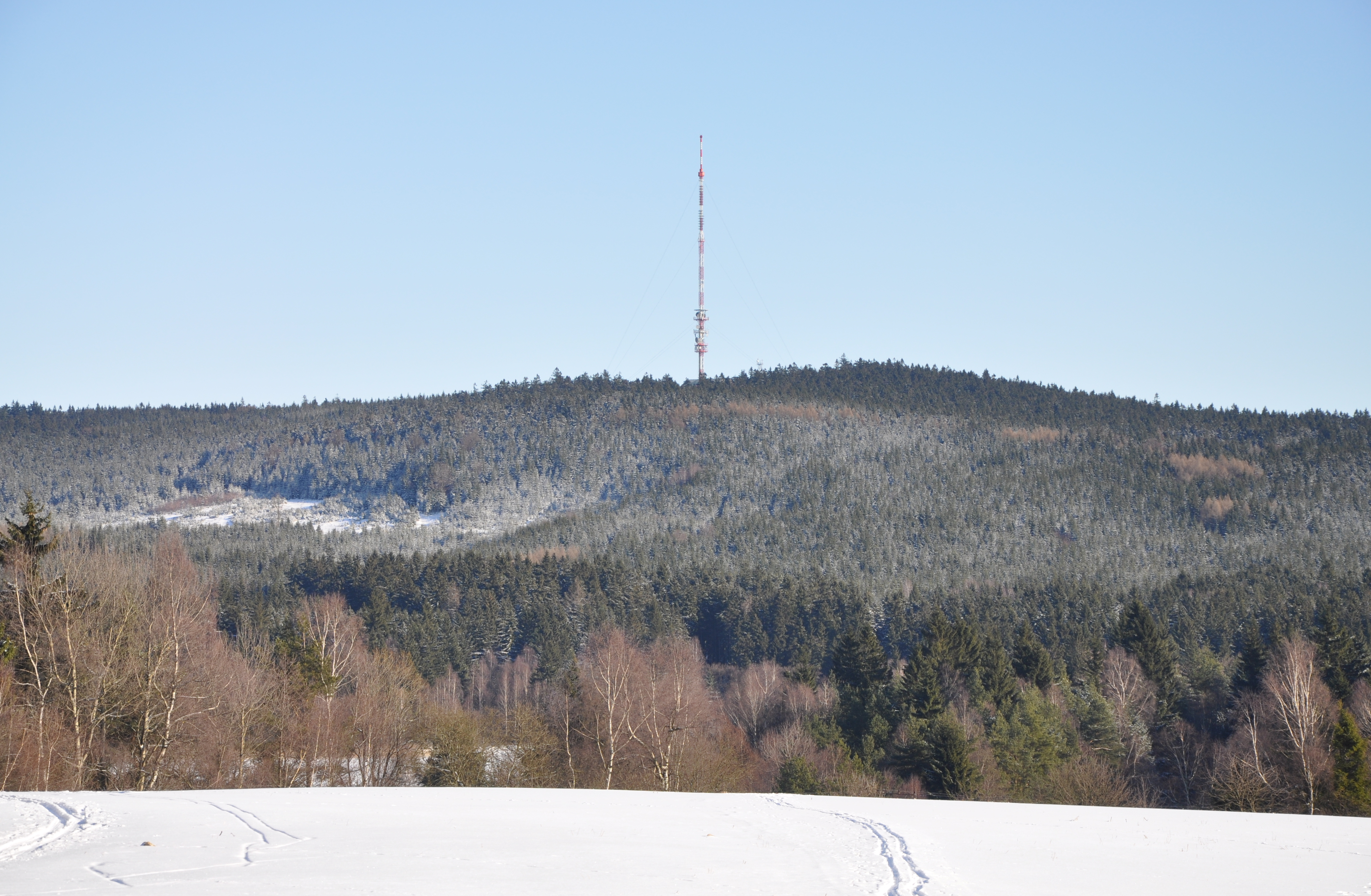
- Winter view of Javořice

Highest point
- Elevation: 837 m (2,746 ft)
- Prominence: 297 m (974 ft)
- Isolation: 66.6 km (41.4 mi)
- Coordinates: 49°13′16″N 15°20′22″E

Geography
- Location within Czech Republic
- Location: Vysočina Region, Czech Republic
- Parent range: Javořice Highlands part of Bohemian-Moravian Highlands

Javořice (German: Jaborschützeberg) is a mountain in the Javořice Highlands mountain range within the Bohemian-Moravian Highlands in the Czech Republic. With an elevation of 837 metres (2,746 ft), it is the highest mountain of the Bohemian-Moravian Highlands and of the Vysočina Region.

It is located near the border between the historical lands of Bohemia and Moravia, right on trace where runs line of main European drainage divide (which runs on southern slope).

== History ==
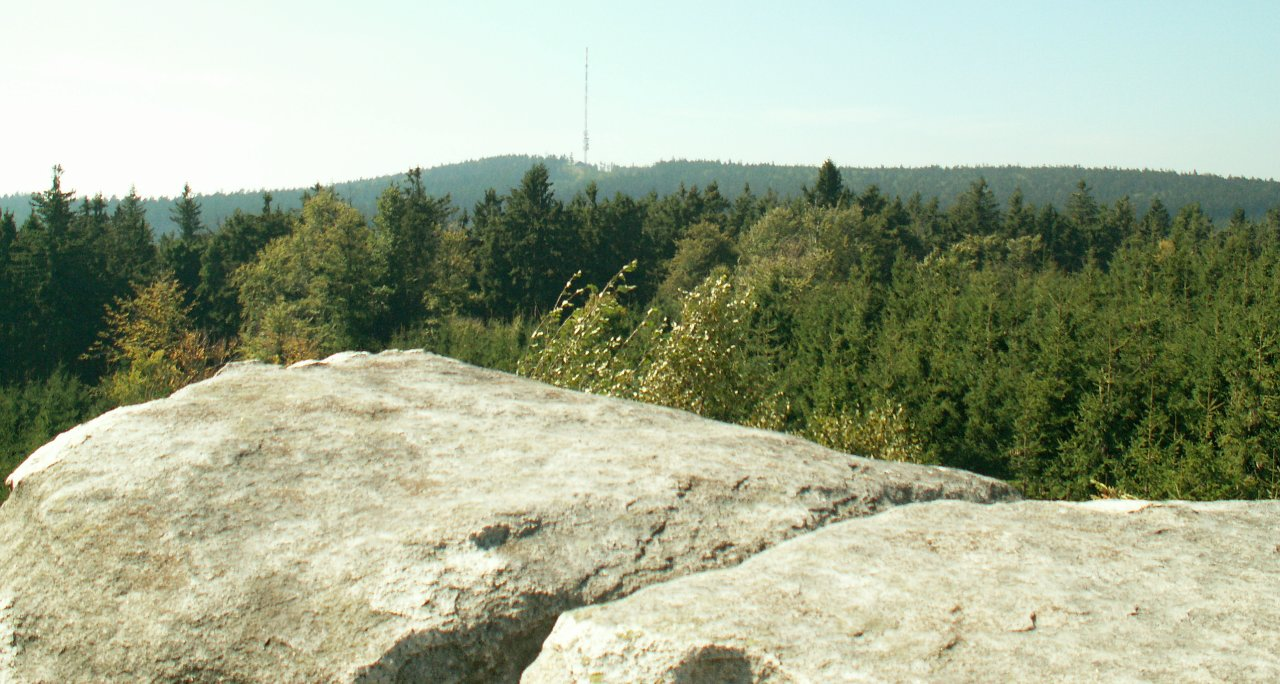
Javořice from Míchova rock

The first construction on the mountain was a simple cabin in 1925 as refuge for mountain hikers.

== Geology ==
The entire massif consists mainly by moldanubic, i.e. series of rocks generated during sedimentation in precambric sea and wrinkled later into mountain chains and composed of crystalline slates and gneiss (a metamorphic rock with foliations), mica schicht and quartzite.

The summit is a round and smooth.

== Flora ==
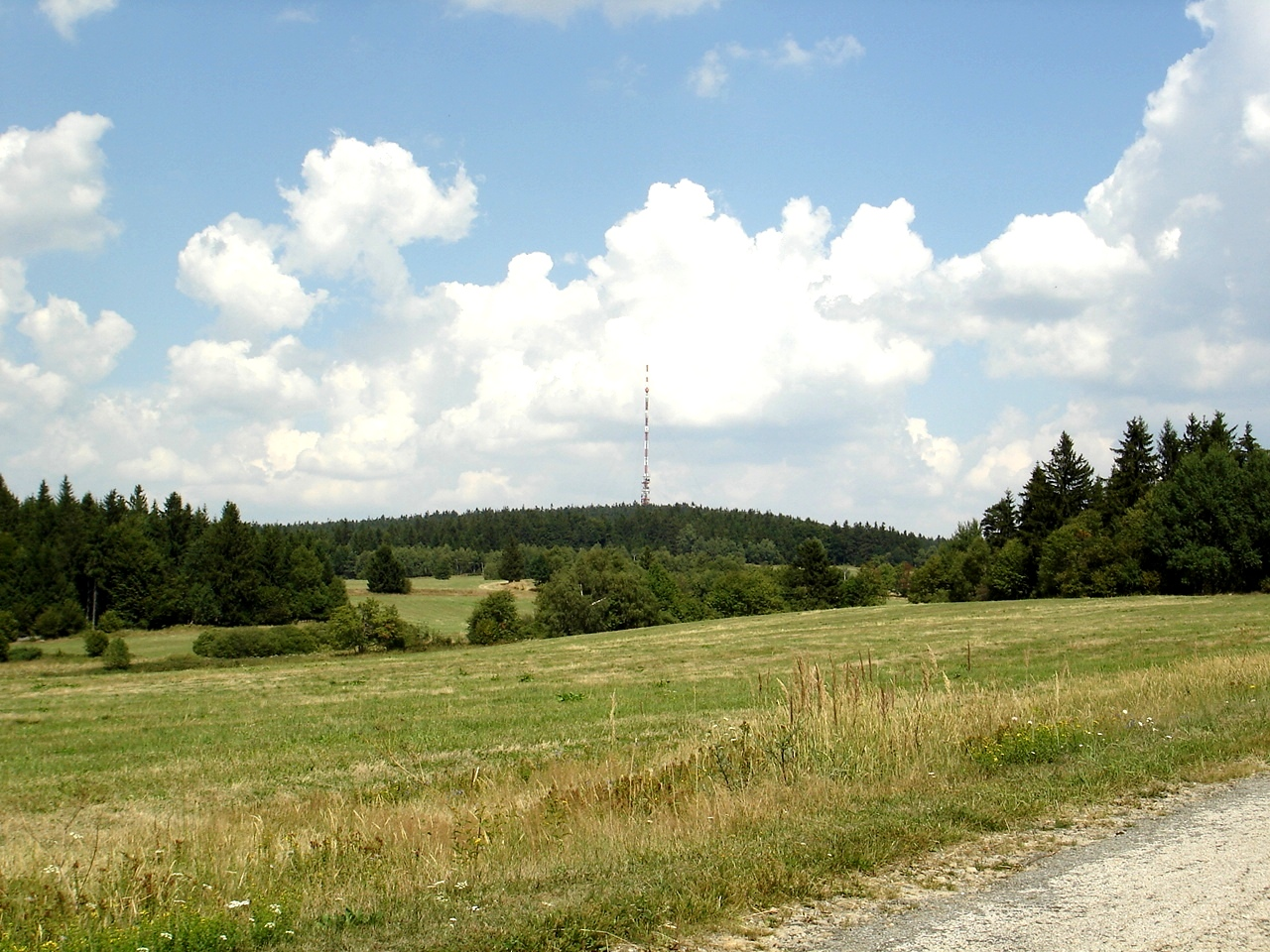
Summit of Javořice from the south

The summit is forested by mixed mainly spruce forest, with some pines, birches and maples. Plants: False lily, fern bracken, western oakfern, and lot of bilberryes.

== Use ==
A TV and radio transmitter is situated on the top. It was built in 1989. The upper platform is used as a facility building by broadcaster. The mountain is also a popular area for cross-country skiing.
